= List of Ivorians =

The following list of Ivorians (in alphabetical order by last name) includes people of various occupations, who are notable and are either born in Ivory Coast, of Ivorian descent or who produce works that are primarily about Ivory Coast.

== Clergymen and religious leaders ==
- Bernard Agré

== Musicians and entertainers ==
- Soum Bill, singer
- Alpha Blondy, international singer
- Tiken Jah Fakoly, singer
- Keiona, drag queen and winner of Drag Race France (season 2)

== Politicians and political leaders ==
- Daniel Aka Ahizi, Minister of Environment, Water, and Forestry (2006–)
- Simeon Aké, politician
- Laurent Akoun, Secretary General of the Ivorian Popular Front
- Pierre Djédji Amondji, Governor of Abidjan
- Paulette Badjo Ezouehu, former Minister of Human Rights and Public Liberties
- Harlette Badou NʼGuessan Kouamé, Minister of Culture and the Francophonie (2021–2022)
- Youssouf Bakayoko, current Minister of Foreign Affairs
- Charles Konan Banny, former prime minister (2005–2007)
- Henri Konan Bédié, former president (1993–1999)
- Félix Houphouët-Boigny, first president of Ivory Coast
- Ibrahim Coulibaly, former army sergeant and rebel leader
- Henriette Diabaté, former Minister of Culture (1990–1993, 2000), former Minister of Justice (2003–05) and current Secretary-General of the RDR (1999–)
- Seydou Diarra, former prime minister (2000, 2003–2005)
- Félix Doh, former rebel leader and leader of the MPIGO
- Daniel Kablan Duncan, former prime minister (1993–1999)
- Amara Essy, diplomat and former Permanent Representative of Ivory Coast to the United Nations (1981–1990)
- Laurent Gbagbo, former president of Ivory Coast (2000–2010)
- Simone Gbagbo, wife of Laurent Gbagbo and member of the Ivorian Popular Front
- Charles Blé Goudé, political leader
- Robert Guéï, former military leader
- Albertine Gnanazan Hépié
- Marie Koré, Independence protester and national hero.
- Ramata Ly-Bakayoko, former Minister of Higher Education and Scientific Research (2016–2018), Minister of Women, Families, and Children (2018–)
- Bamba Mamadou, politician
- Léon Emmanuel Monnet, politician, Minister of Mines and Energy of Côte d'Ivoire
- Michel Amani N'Guessan, politician
- Pascal Affi N'Guessan, politician
- Aboubakar Diaby Ouattara, politician
- Alassane Ouattara, former prime minister, President of the Republic of Ivory Coast
- Guillaume Soro, current prime minister of Ivory Coast (2007–)
- Anne Gnahouret Tatret, politician and diplomat
- Masséré Touré (born 1974), politician active in communications and finance
- Francis Wodié (1936–2023), politician
- Aimée Zebeyoux (born 1959), politician

== Sportspeople and athletes ==
- Henry Koloman Fayiah, retired sprinter
- Gregory Arkhurst, Olympic swimmer
- Louise Ayétotché, sprinter
- Mohamed Bengali, footballer
- Wilfried Bony. footballer for Swansea City A.F.C.
- Max Brito, Senegal-born former rugby union player
- Aruna Dindane, footballer for Lekhwiya
- Seydou Doumbia, footballer for CSKA Moscow
- Didier Drogba, retired footballer
- Emmanuel Eboué, retired footballer
- Yann Ekra, footballer for Harrisburg City Islanders
- Gervinho, footballer for A.S. Roma
- Salomon Kalou, footballer for Lille OSC
- Arouna Koné, footballer for Lekhwiya
- Ouattara Lagazane, sprinter
- Hervé Lamizana, basketball player
- René Mélédjé, hurdler
- Ibrahim Meité, sprinter
- Emmanuelle Mouké, professional basketball player
- Célestine N'Drin, sprinter
- Éric Pacôme N'Dri, sprinter
- Alain Ngalani, Kickboxer and Muay Thai fighter
- Clément N'Goran, tennis player
- Blandine N'Goran, professional basketball player
- Gabriel Tiacoh, sprinter
- Kolo Touré, footballer for Liverpool
- Yaya Touré, footballer for Manchester City
- Franck Waota, sprinter
- Jean-Olivier Zirignon, sprinter

== Writers ==
- Marguerite Abouet, writer of graphic novel Aya
- Angèle Bassolé-Ouédraogo, poet and journalist
- Micheline Coulibaly, Vietnam-born children's books writer
- Bernard Binlin Dadié, novelist, playwright and poet
- Ahmadou Kourouma, novelist
- Agnès Kraidy, journalist
- Véronique Tadjo, Pan-African writer

== Other ==
- Pierre Djibril Coulibaly, software engineer
- Mireille Dosso (born 1952), virologist
- Pascale Guiton, microbiologist and founder of Guiton Lab
- Hubertine Rose Éholie (1934–2019), chemist

== See also ==
- List of people by nationality
