= Elections in Ivory Coast =

Ivory Coast, also known as Côte d'Ivoire, elects on national level a head of state – the president – and a legislature. The president is elected for a five-year term by the people. The National Assembly (Assemblée Nationale) has 225 members, elected for a five-year term in single-seat constituencies. Côte d'Ivoire is a one party dominant state with the RHDP in power. Opposition parties are allowed, but are widely considered to have no real chance of gaining power. Following a peace deal between the government and former rebels in March 2007, the next elections were planned for early 2008. These elections however, were postponed to November 2009 first, and then to early 2010.

Ivory Coast is the 20th most electorally democratic nation (0.39 points) and the 22nd most liberally democratic nation (0.23 points) in Africa according to the V-Dem Democracy Indices, and is classified as an "electoral autocracy".

== Latest elections ==
=== Presidential elections ===
Candidate	Party	Votes	%
Alassane Ouattara	Rally of Houphouëtists for Democracy and Peace	3,759,030	91.23
Jean-Louis Billon	Democratic Congress	129,493	3.14
Simone Gbagbo	Movement of Capable Generations	101,238	2.46
Ahoua Don Mello	Independent	82,508	2.00
Henriette Lagou Adjoua	Independent	48,261	1.17
Total		4,120,530	100.00
Valid votes		4,120,530	95.99
Invalid votes		105,156	2.45
Blank votes		66,788	1.56
Total votes		4,292,474	100.00
Registered voters/turnout		8,568,456	50.10
Source: CEI

=== Parliamentary elections ===
Party	Votes	%	Seats	+/–
Rally of Houphouëtists for Democracy and Peace	1,825,244	61.95	196	+57
Democratic Party of Ivory Coast	354,618	12.04	32	+9
Democratic Party of Ivory Coast/Ivorian Popular Front/Today and Tomorrow, Ivory Coast	18,757	0.64	0	New
Ivorian Popular Front	14,164	0.48	1	–1
Today and Tomorrow, Ivory Coast	11,883	0.40	0	New
Today and Tomorrow, Ivory Coast/Group of Political Partners for Peace/VALEUR	7,489	0.25	0	New
Democratic Congress	4,149	0.14	0	New
Movement of Capable Generations	3,823	0.13	0	New
Together for Democracy and Sovereignty	3,387	0.11	0	–8
Democratic Party of Ivory Coast/Together for Democracy and Sovereignty	2,719	0.09	0	–50
Union for the Republic	2,571	0.09	1	New
Act for Institutions and Development	1,550	0.05	0	New
Group of Political Partners for Peace	1,253	0.04	0	0
Union of Democrats for Progress	1,209	0.04	0	0
Le Buffle – Victory for Development	1,159	0.04	1	New
National Democratic and Reformist Front	934	0.03	0	0
National Congress for the Development of Ivory Coast	881	0.03	0	0
National Movement for Reconciliation and Peace	727	0.02	0	New
Party for African Integration/Ivorian Renaissance Party/Democratic Congress	622	0.02	0	New
Ivorian Alliance for the Republic and Democracy	566	0.02	0	New
Democratic Movement for Renewal	542	0.02	0	New
People's Party of Social Democrats	492	0.02	0	0
Network of Free Voters of Ivory Coast	334	0.01	0	0
Union of Democratic Forces	289	0.01	0	New
New Union for Ivory Coast	249	0.01	0	0
Prosperity, Happiness and Joy of Living	219	0.01	0	New
Alliance for the Republic	214	0.01	0	New
Ivorian Centrist Alliance	193	0.01	0	0
Ivorian Movement for Democratic Renewal and the Emancipation of Peoples	179	0.01	0	New
Rally for Democracy and Peace	175	0.01	0	New
Movement for the Emergence of Republicans of Ivory Coast	164	0.01	0	New
Democratic and Citizen Union	141	0.00	0	New
National Patriotic Circle for a New ivory Coast	110	0.00	0	New
National Integrity and Conscience	94	0.00	0	0
Pro Ivory Coast	70	0.00	0	New
National Youth Convergence of Bafing for ADO	68	0.00	0	New
Union for the Promotion of Ivory Coast	68	0.00	0	New
Pan-African Patriotic Front	37	0.00	0	New
Government of Justice and Peace in Ivory Coast	35	0.00	0	New
Party for African Integration/Democratic Congress	35	0.00	0	New
Movement of Leaders for a Prosperous Ivory Coast	30	0.00	0	New
Congress for the Ivorian and Pan-African Renaissance	17	0.00	0	New
Independents	655,143	22.24	24	–1
Blank votes	29,640	1.01	–	–
Total	2,946,243	100.00	255	–
Valid votes	2,946,243	97.72		
Invalid votes	68,693	2.28		
Total votes	3,014,936	100.00		
Registered voters/turnout	8,597,092	35.07		
Source: CEI (main results) CEI (re-runs)

== See also ==
- Electoral calendar
- Electoral system
