= Adama Bictogo =

Ivorian businessman and politician

President of the National Assembly of Ivory Coast
- In office 7 June 2022 – 17 January 2026
- Preceded by: Amadou Soumahoro
- Succeeded by: Patrick Achi

Mayor of Yopougon
- Incumbent
- Assumed office 2023

Vice-President of the National Assembly of Ivory Coast
- In office 14 April 2021 – 7 June 2022

Member of the National Assembly
- Incumbent
- Assumed office 11 December 2011
- Constituency: Agboville commune (2011–2026); Yopougon (since 2026)

Minister of African Integration
- In office 1 June 2011 – 13 March 2012
- Prime Minister: Guillaume Soro
- Succeeded by: Ally Coulibaly

Personal details
- Born: 14 December 1962 (age 63) Agboville, Ivory Coast
- Party: Rally of Houphouëtists for Democracy and Peace
- Relatives: Moumini Bictogo (brother)
- Education: Paris-East Créteil University; Institut supérieur de gestion
- Occupation: Businessman, politician

Adama Bictogo (born 14 December 1962) is an Ivorian businessman and politician. He founded the company Snedai and is executive secretary of the Rally of Houphouëtists for Democracy and Peace (RHDP), the ruling party of Ivory Coast.

He was Minister of African Integration from 2011 to 2012 and has been a member of the National Assembly since 2011. He served as President of the National Assembly from 7 June 2022 to 17 January 2026, and has been mayor of Yopougon since 2023.

== Early life and education ==
Bictogo was born on 14 December 1962 in Agboville. He holds a DEUG in applied economics from Paris XII University in Créteil and a master's degree in business strategy and administration from the Institut supérieur de gestion. His brother Moumini Bictogo is also a businessman.

== Business career ==
Bictogo heads the Snedai group and the construction company Marylis BTP.

== Political career ==
In 1999, Bictogo was a special adviser to General Robert Guéï. He was Minister of African Integration from 2011 to 2012. He was implicated in the handling of compensation after the Probo Koala affair: the firm MBLA, which he headed, was accused of diverting part of the €7 million awarded to victims. He was not convicted.

He was elected to the National Assembly for Agboville in 2011 with 41% of the vote, re-elected in 2016 with 57% and in March 2021 with 53.6%.

On 14 April 2021, he was elected Vice-President of the National Assembly. In the absence of Speaker Amadou Soumahoro, President Alassane Ouattara chose him over the doyen Mamadou Diawara to act as interim president of the Assembly, until Soumahoro's return at the end of April. He again acted as interim president from January 2022 because of Soumahoro's ill health.

In February 2022, a reorganisation of the RHDP moved him from executive director to executive secretary under a party directorate, where he ranked only sixth in protocol order; this was seen as a rebuke over his openly stated ambition to run in the 2025 presidential election.

=== President of the National Assembly ===
After Soumahoro's death in May 2022, Bictogo was backed by Ouattara and the RHDP for the Assembly presidency. He was elected on 7 June 2022 with 237 votes, against six for Jean-Michel Amankou of the PDCI-RDA.

Nominated by the RHDP in November 2022, he was elected mayor of Yopougon in September 2023 with 44% of the vote, ahead of Michel Gbagbo (37%).

In the December 2025 parliamentary election, he stood in Yopougon instead of Agboville and won against Dia Houphouët Augustin Yohou. On 17 January 2026, at the opening of the new legislature, former prime minister Patrick Achi succeeded him as President of the National Assembly.

Political offices
Preceded by Amadou Soumahoro	President of the National Assembly of Ivory Coast; 2022–2026	Succeeded by Patrick Achi
