= 2025 Ivorian presidential election =

- 25 October 2025
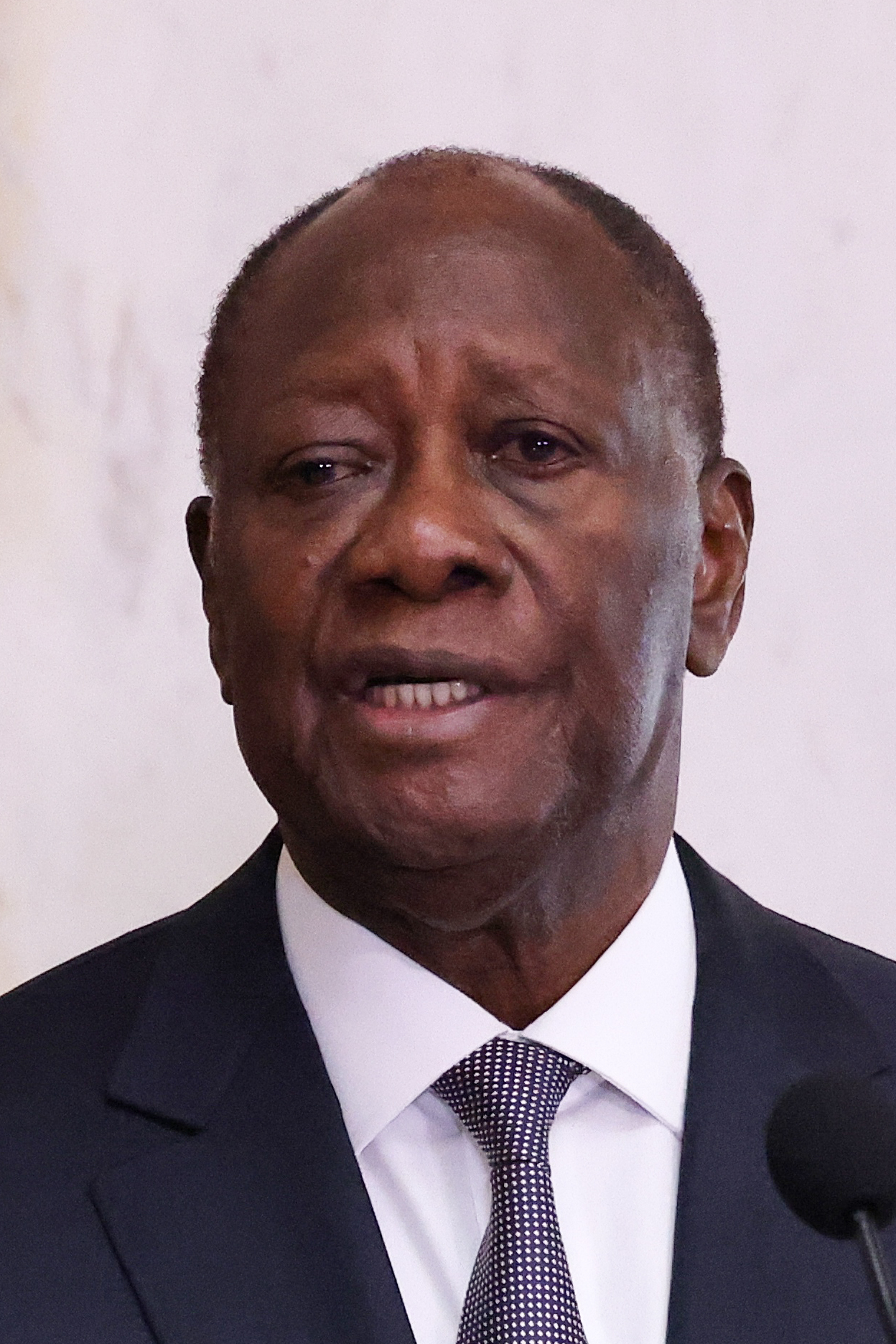

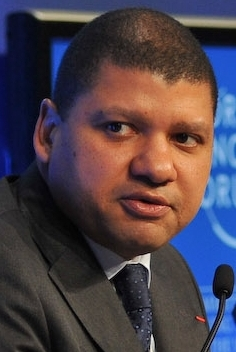
Candidate	Alassane Ouattara	Jean-Louis Billon
Party	RHDP	Independent
Popular vote	3,759,030	129,493
Percentage	91.23%	3.14%
President before election
Alassane Ouattara
RDR
Elected President
Alassane Ouattara
RDR

Presidential elections were held in Ivory Coast on 25 October 2025. Incumbent President Alassane Ouattara was re-elected with 91% of the vote.

== Electoral system ==
The President of Ivory Coast is elected by absolute majority vote through a two-round system to serve a five-year term.

== Candidates ==
=== Approved ===
The final list of candidates was released by the electoral commission on 10 September 2025. These included:

- Alassane Ouattara (RHDP)
- Jean-Louis Billon (Ind.)
- Simone Gbagbo (MGC)
- Ahoua Don Mello (Ind.)
- Henriette Lagou Adjoua

=== Declared ===
- Alassane Ouattara (RHDP), president of Ivory Coast (2010–present). He confirmed his candidacy on 29 July.
- Vincent Toh Bi Irié (Ind.), former mayor of Abidjan
- Gnangbo Kacou (Ind.), former deputy
- Pascal Affi N'Guessan (FPI), former primer minister of Ivory Coast (2000–2003) and president of the Ivorian Popular Front.
- Jean-Louis Billon (Ind.), Minister of Commerce (2015–present)
- Simone Gbagbo (MGC), former first lady of Ivory Coast (2000–2011)
- Ahoua Don Mello (Ind.), former minister
- Henriette Lagou Adjoua

=== Disqualified ===
- Tidjane Thiam (PDCI-RDA), businessman and the executive chairman of Freedom Acquisition Corp.
- Laurent Gbagbo (PPA-CI), former president of Ivory Coast (2000–2011)
- Charles Ble Goude
- Guillaume Soro, former prime minister and rebel leader

== Campaign ==
Some presidential candidates, including Gnangbo Kacou, planned to abandon the CFA franc.

In October 2025 the government issued a ban on public meetings and demonstrations that sought to contest the exclusion of key opposition figures from the election.

== Results ==
Candidate	Party	Votes	%
Alassane Ouattara	Rally of Houphouëtists for Democracy and Peace	3,759,030	91.23
Jean-Louis Billon	Democratic Congress	129,493	3.14
Simone Gbagbo	Movement of Capable Generations	101,238	2.46
Ahoua Don Mello	Independent	82,508	2.00
Henriette Lagou Adjoua	Independent	48,261	1.17
Total		4,120,530	100.00
Valid votes		4,120,530	95.99
Invalid votes		105,156	2.45
Blank votes		66,788	1.56
Total votes		4,292,474	100.00
Registered voters/turnout		8,568,456	50.10
Source: CEI
