= Gnangbo Kacou =

Ivorian politician

Gnangbo Kacou (born 18 February 1962) is an Ivorian politician. He serves as a Member of the National Assembly of Cote d'Ivoire, representing Adiaké, Assinie et Etuéboué in the National Assembly, as well as the fourth vice-president of the Sud-Comoé Regional Council.

== Biography ==
Kacou was born in Abiaty on 18 February 1962 and completed his studies in France. A tax accountant by training, Kacou was elected as a member of parliament for the district of Adiaké, Assinie and Etuéboué in the 2011 Ivorian parliamentary election. Since 24 April 2013, Kacou has also served as the fourth vice-president of the Regional Council of Sud-Comoé.

Kacou has presented himself as a candidate for president in the 2015, 2020, and 2025 presidential elections.
