= African People's Party – Côte d'Ivoire =

African People's Party – Côte d'Ivoire Parti des peuples africains – Côte d'Ivoire
- Abbreviation: PPA–CI
- Leader: Laurent Gbagbo
- President: Assoa Adou
- Spokesperson: Justin Koné Katinan
- Founder: Laurent Gbagbo
- Founded: 17 October 2021
- Split from: Ivorian Popular Front
- Ideology: Democratic socialism Pan-Africanism; African socialism Anti-imperialism
- Political position: Left-wing
- Colours: Azure
- National Assembly: 0 / 255

Website
- ccdupartidegbagbo.com

The African People's Party – Côte d'Ivoire (French: Parti des peuples africains – Côte d'Ivoire; PPA–CI) is an Ivorian political party founded in 2021 in the wake of the return to Côte d'Ivoire of former President Laurent Gbagbo, who preferred creating this new formation rather than trying to retake the position of head of the party which he had created in 1982 with his wife Simone Gbagbo, the Ivorian Popular Front (FPI). The 18 members of the legislature elected in March 2021 to the pro-Gbagbo Together for Democracy and Sovereignty party left and joined the PPA-CI at its founding in October 2021.

== Organizational chart ==
On 25 October 2021, a “Strategic and Political Council” was created, the members of which are:

1. Assoa Adou, president
2. Sébastien Djédjé Dano, 1st vice-president
3. Justin Koné Katinan, 2nd vice-president and party spokesperson
4. Emmanuel Auguste Ackah, Chief of Staff to President Laurent Gbagbo
5. Laurent Akoun
6. Massany Bamba
7. Alphonse Douati
8. Stéphane Aymar Kipré
9. Richard Kodjo
10. Pascal Dago Kokora
11. Boubacar Koné
12. Kouakou André Kouassi
13. Douayoua Lia Bi
14. Moïse Lida Kouassi
15. Odette Likikouet Sauyet
16. Marie-Odette Lorougnon Gnabry
17. Georges Armand Ouégnin

Hubert Oulaye was appointed executive chairman and Damana Pickass general secretary of the party.

The deputy spokesperson is Habiba Touré.

== Strategy to come into power ==
=== 2023 municipal and regional elections ===
Given the future elections, the PPA-CI set up a limited train line of typical team for representation in 22 regions out of 31 regions, given the difficulty posed by the Independent Electoral Commission (CEI) to its party leader Laurent Gbagbo. The candidates that stood in this election included Hubert Oulaye (Region of Cavally), Damana Adia (Region of Gboklè), Sébastien Dano Djédjé (Goh Region), Stéphane Kipré (Haut Sassandra Region), Assoa Adou (Indénié Djuablin Region), Georges Armand Ouégnin (Sud-Comoé Region) and Ahoua Don Mello (Moronou Region).

=== Prominent municipal candidates with highest winning rate ===
Prominent candidates include Michel Gbagbo from the district of Abidjan, Ake Mgbo Fleur Esther from Agneby Tiassa.
