= Désiré Tagro =

Ivorian politician (1959–2011)

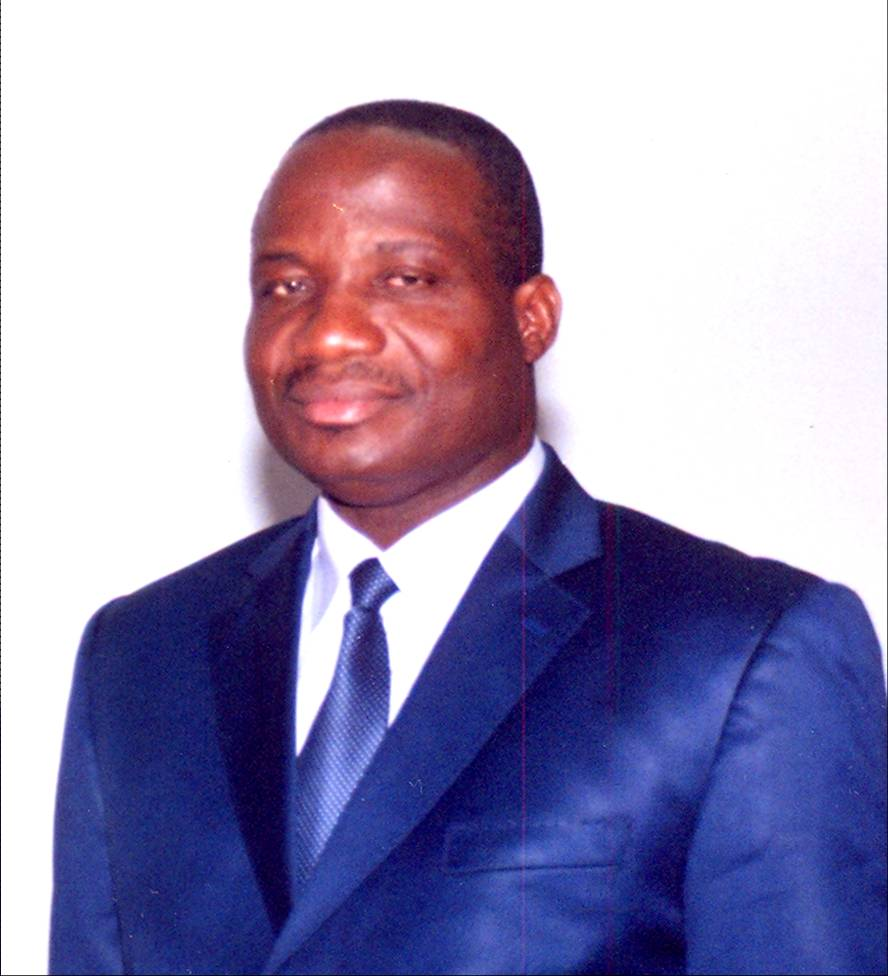
Désiré Tagro in 2008.

Désiré Asségnini Tagro (27 January 1959 in Issia Department – 12 April 2011) was an Ivorian politician who served as the Minister of the Interior and chief of staff for Ivorian President Laurent Gbagbo during the 2010–2011 Ivorian crisis. Tagro was a top ally of Gbagbo.

In June 2010, Mamadou Koulibaly, the President of the National Assembly of Côte d'Ivoire, accused Désiré Tagro, the Minister of the Interior, of embezzling money and showing regional favoritism regarding admissions to a training school for the police. President Laurent Gbagbo ordered an investigation into the allegations; in July 2010, the investigation judged that the allegations were without merit, and Tagro, who continued to enjoy Gbagbo's favor, was ultimately unscathed by the allegation.

During the Second Ivorian Civil War of 2010 and 2011, the U.S. Treasury Department banned American companies and individuals from doing commercial or financial business with Désiré Tagro, as well as Laurent Gbagbo, Gbagbo's foreign minister, Alcide Djédjé, and the head of the Ivorian Popular Front, Pascal Affi N’Guessan.

Tagro and Laurent Gbagbo were arrested on 11 April 2011 at Gbagbo's home in Abidjan by Republican forces loyal to President Alassane Ouattara. Tagro suffered a gunshot wound to the face during the arrest, though the circumstances remain unclear. Some Gbagbo loyalists claimed that Tagro was shot by Republican forces while in custody at the Golf Hotel. Tagro was taken to a hospital in Abidjan by U.N. peacekeepers, where he died on 12 April 2011 at the age of 52. United Nations Under-Secretary-General for Peacekeeping Operations Alain Le Roy said that Tagro's death "is to be deplored."
