= N'Guessan =

N'Guessan is a surname. Notable people with the surname include:

- Dany N'Guessan (born 1987), French footballer
- Michel Amani N'Guessan (born 1957), defence minister of Côte d'Ivoire
- Pascal Affi N'Guessan (born 1953), former Prime Minister of Côte d'Ivoire
- Sylvain Komenan N'Guessan (born 1983), Ivorian footballer
