= 2016 Ivorian parliamentary election =

- 18 December 2016
- All 255 seats in the National Assembly; 128 seats needed for a majority
- Turnout: 34.11% (▼2.45pp)
Party	Leader	Vote %	Seats	+/–
RHDP	Henri Konan Bédié	50.26	167	−44
FPI	Pascal Affi N'Guessan	5.83	3	New
UDPCI	Albert Toikeusse Mabri	2.99	6	−1
UPCI	Gnamien Konan	1.03	3	+2
Independents	–	38.50	76	+41
This lists parties that won seats. See the complete results below.
Prime Minister before	Prime Minister after
Daniel Kablan Duncan; PDCI–RDA	Amadou Gon Coulibaly; RDR

Parliamentary elections were held in Ivory Coast on 18 December 2016. The new constitution, which was approved in a referendum in October, reduced the term for the 255 members of the National Assembly from five to four years.

The presidential coalition, the Rally of Houphouëtists for Democracy and Peace (composed of the Rally of the Republicans, the Democratic Party of Ivory Coast – African Democratic Rally and some minor parties) won more than the half the seats in the National Assembly.

== Electoral system ==
The 255 members of the National Assembly were elected from 169 single-member constituencies and 36 multi-member constituencies with between two and six seats. In single-member constituencies voters cast a vote for one candidate who is elected by first-past-the-post voting; whereas in multi-member constituencies candidates were elected by plurality-at-large voting, where voters cast a single vote for a closed list, with the list receiving the most votes winning all seats in the constituency.

== Campaign ==
A total of 1,336 candidates contested the elections, 597 representing 38 political parties and 739 as independents. The Rally of Houphouëtists for Democracy and Peace had the most candidates (248), with the Ivorian Popular Front (which had boycotted the 2011 elections) the only other party to run candidates in more than half of constituencies, having nominated 187 candidates. Sixteen parties contested only one seat.

== Results ==
In constituency 34 there was a tie between two candidates, with the independent candidate Léonard Guéi Desseloue and Marius Sarr Bohe (RHDP) both receiving 1,231 votes. A second round of voting took place within 15 days. Léonard Sahé won the last constituency achieving 52.69% while Marius Sarr got 46.31%.

Party	Votes	%	Seats	+/–
Rally of Houphouëtists for Democracy and Peace	1,019,057	50.26	167	−44
Ivorian Popular Front	118,130	5.83	3	New
Union for Democracy and Peace in Ivory Coast	60,566	2.99	6	−1
Union for Ivory Coast	20,806	1.03	3	+2
Liberty and Democracy for the Republic	3,050	0.15	0	0
Rally for Peace, Progress and Sharing	2,628	0.13	0	New
United Cape for Democracy and Development	2,513	0.12	0	0
Alliance of Democratic Forces	2,308	0.11	0	New
Union of Democrats for Progress	2,235	0.11	0	New
Democratic and Civic Union	2,207	0.11	0	0
Democratic and Social Movement	1,576	0.08	0	0
Renewal for Peace and Agreement	1,303	0.06	0	New
Collective of Democratic Ivorians	1,136	0.06	0	New
Congress for Ivorian Renewal	1,101	0.05	0	New
Union for Total Democracy in Ivory Coast	984	0.05	0	0
People's Party of Social Democrats	861	0.04	0	New
Republican Union for Democracy	848	0.04	0	New
Union for Progress	648	0.03	0	New
Pan-African Democratic Rally	644	0.03	0	0
National Democratic and Reformist Front	596	0.03	0	New
Ivorian Party of Greens	466	0.02	0	New
National Civic Movement	444	0.02	0	0
Congress of People for Development and Freedom	440	0.02	0	New
Union for National Progress	319	0.02	0	0
People's Socialist Union	306	0.02	0	0
Democracy for Freedom and Cohesion	233	0.01	0	New
Ivorian Party of Rising to Challenges	201	0.01	0	0
Party of Unity and Progress of Ivory Coast	184	0.01	0	New
Revolutionary Communist Party of Ivory Coast	178	0.01	0	0
Congress for Ivorian Renewal–Panafrican	177	0.01	0	New
Ivorian Ecological Movement	163	0.01	0	0
Union of Popular Masses	134	0.01	0	New
Republican Party of Ivory Coast	106	0.01	0	0
Union for Development and Freedoms	101	0.00	0	New
National Alliance of Ivory Coast	93	0.00	0	New
Ivorian Party of Farmers	40	0.00	0	0
Progressive Movement of Ivory Coast	30	0.00	0	New
La Renaissance	20	0.00	0	0
Independents	780,629	38.50	76	+41
Total	2,027,461	100.00	255	0
Valid votes	2,027,461	94.83		
Invalid/blank votes	110,575	5.17		
Total votes	2,138,036	100.00		
Registered voters/turnout	6,268,113	34.11		
Source: CEI

== Aftermath ==
When the National Assembly began meeting for the new parliamentary term, Guillaume Soro, an RHDP deputy, was re-elected as President of the National Assembly on 9 January 2017. He received 230 votes from the 252 deputies present; Evariste Méambly, an independent deputy, received 12 votes, and there were 10 spoilt votes.
