= Émile Boga Doudou =

Ivorian politician

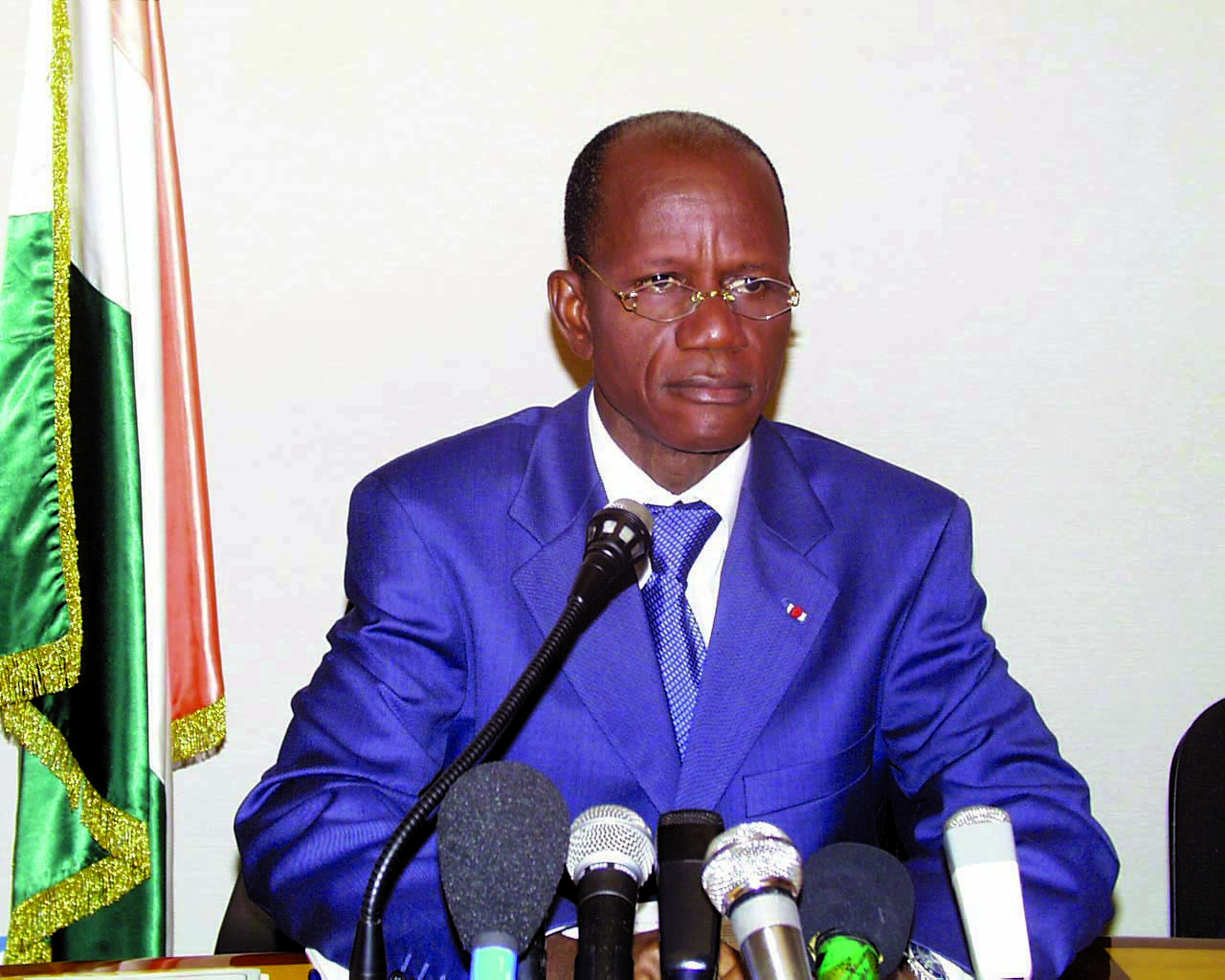
Émile Boga Doudou

Émile Boga Doudou (1952 – September 19, 2002) was an Ivorian politician who was minister of state for the interior and decentralization from 2000 to 2002. He was killed in the failed coup attempt at the start of the Ivorian Civil War.

== Early life and career ==
Doudou was born in 1952 in Domaboué, near Lakota, Côte d'Ivoire. A lawyer by profession, Doudou was married and had three children.

Doudou was a founding member of the Ivorian Popular Front (FPI) in 1982. At the party's Constitutive Congress in 1988, he became a member of the secretariat-general of the FPI; he was subsequently a member of the secretariat-general from 1990 to 2001. He was elected to the National Assembly as an FPI candidate in the November 1990 parliamentary election, and he was re-elected in the November 1995 parliamentary election. In the National Assembly, he was president of the FPI Parliamentary Group.

He was a close ally of the FPI leader Laurent Gbagbo. Following a military coup in December 1999, a presidential election was held in October 2000. Gbagbo, the FPI candidate, claimed victory and became president. He then appointed Doudou as minister of state for the interior and decentralization in the government named on October 27, 2000. On December 5, 2000, Doudou controversially showed firearms on national television which armed forces had seized at a mosque.

Doudou was elected to the National Assembly again in the December 2000 parliamentary election. He was initially a candidate for the post of president of the National Assembly following the election, but he withdrew his candidacy before the vote was held on January 22, 2001. Mamadou Koulibaly, another member of the FPI, was elected to the post without opposition. Doudou subsequently remained a member of the government.

At the FPI's Third Extraordinary Congress, held from July 20 to July 22, 2001, Doudou was elected as the third vice-president of the FPI, a newly created position.

== Death ==
He was killed on September 19, 2002, in Abidjan during a failed coup attempt. The uprising began on September 19 with automatic-weapons fire erupting outside a paramilitary police base in Abidjan. "Hundreds" of troops attacked police headquarters and the houses of two ministers. Besides Doudou, at least 80 loyalist soldiers were killed by the rebels.

Gunfire and explosions spread to other parts of the Ivorian capital, including central areas and the suburbs. During this, state radio and television were off the air and the international airport was closed. Soldiers shot at motorists who were approaching roadblocks. This attempted coup came while President Laurent Gbagbo was on a state visit to Italy. Violence continued into September 20 and became the basis for the Ivorian Civil War.

== Funeral ==
Doudou's funeral was held on August 1, 2003. His body was moved in a procession from a hospital morgue in Treichville, Abidjan, to the National Assembly, where deputies paid their last respects to him. A requiem mass was held at the Saint-Paul Cathedral in Plateau, the administrative district of Abidjan, and his body was taken to his home town for burial.
