= Djédjé =

Djédjé is a surname. Notable people with the surname include:

- Alphonse Djédjé Mady (1945-2025), Ivorian politician
- Alcide Djédjé (born 1956), Ivorian diplomat
- Brice Dja Djédjé (born 1990), Ivorian footballer
- Ernesto Djédjé (1948–1983), Ivorian musician
- Franck Dja Djédjé (born 1986), Ivorian footballer
- Guiza Djédjé (born 1995), Ivorian footballer
- Rayan Djedje (born 2001), French footballer
