= Yacef =

Yacef is a surname. Notable people with the surname include:

- Hamza Yacef (born 1979), Algerian footballer
- Saadi Yacef (1928–2021), Algerian politician

== See also ==
- Yace (disambiguation)
