= Alphonse Djédjé Mady =

Ivorian politician (1945–2026)

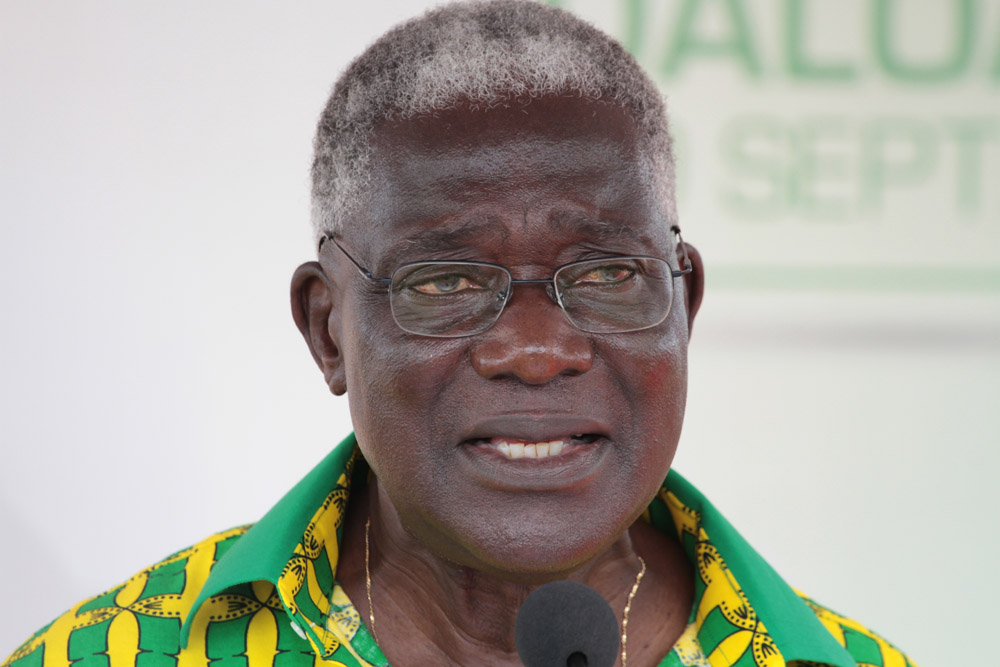
- Djédjé Mady in 2015

Minister of Health
- In office 18 November 1983 – 16 October 1989
- President: Félix Houphouët-Boigny
- Preceded by: Lazéni Coulibaly
- Succeeded by: Alain Ekra

Personal details
- Born: 1 January 1945 Gazehio, French Ivory Coast, French West Africa
- Died: 23 August 2026 (aged 81)
- Party: PDCI-RDA
- Occupation: Doctor

Alphonse Djédjé Mady (1 January 1945 – 23 August 2026) was an Ivorian politician of the Democratic Party of Ivory Coast – African Democratic Rally (PDCI-RDA).

== Life and career ==
Born in Gazehio on 1 January 1945, Djédjé Mady studied medicine and worked as a doctor before serving as Minister of Health under President Félix Houphouët-Boigny from 1983 to 1989. In the 2010 presidential election, he was campaign director for Henri Konan Bédié. In 2013, with the support of the Rally of Houphouëtists for Democracy and Peace (RHDP), he was elected president of the regional council of Haut-Sassandra. He was re-elected in 2018, defeating RHDP candidate Matthieu Babaud Darret. In 2023, he led a joint list with the PDCI-RDA and African People's Party – Côte d'Ivoire, but was defeated by the RHDP's Mamadou Touré.

Djédjé Mady died on 23 August 2026, at the age of 81.
