= Ivorian general election, 2010 =

Ivorian general election, 2010 may refer to one of two elections that were held in Côte d'Ivoire in 2010:

- Ivorian presidential election, 2010 : were held October 31, 2010;
- Ivorian parliamentary election, 2010, were to be held in late 2010, moved to 2011 due to Second Ivorian Civil War.
