= Komenan =

Komenan is a surname. Notable people with the surname include:

- Kouakou Komenan (born 1942), Ivorian sprinter
- Zakpa Komenan (1945–2021), Ivorian politician
- Anthony Moura-Komenan (born 1986), Ivorian footballer
- Sylvain Komenan N'Guessan (born 1983), Ivorian footballer
