= Harlette Badou NʼGuessan Kouamé =

Ivorian politician (born 1978)

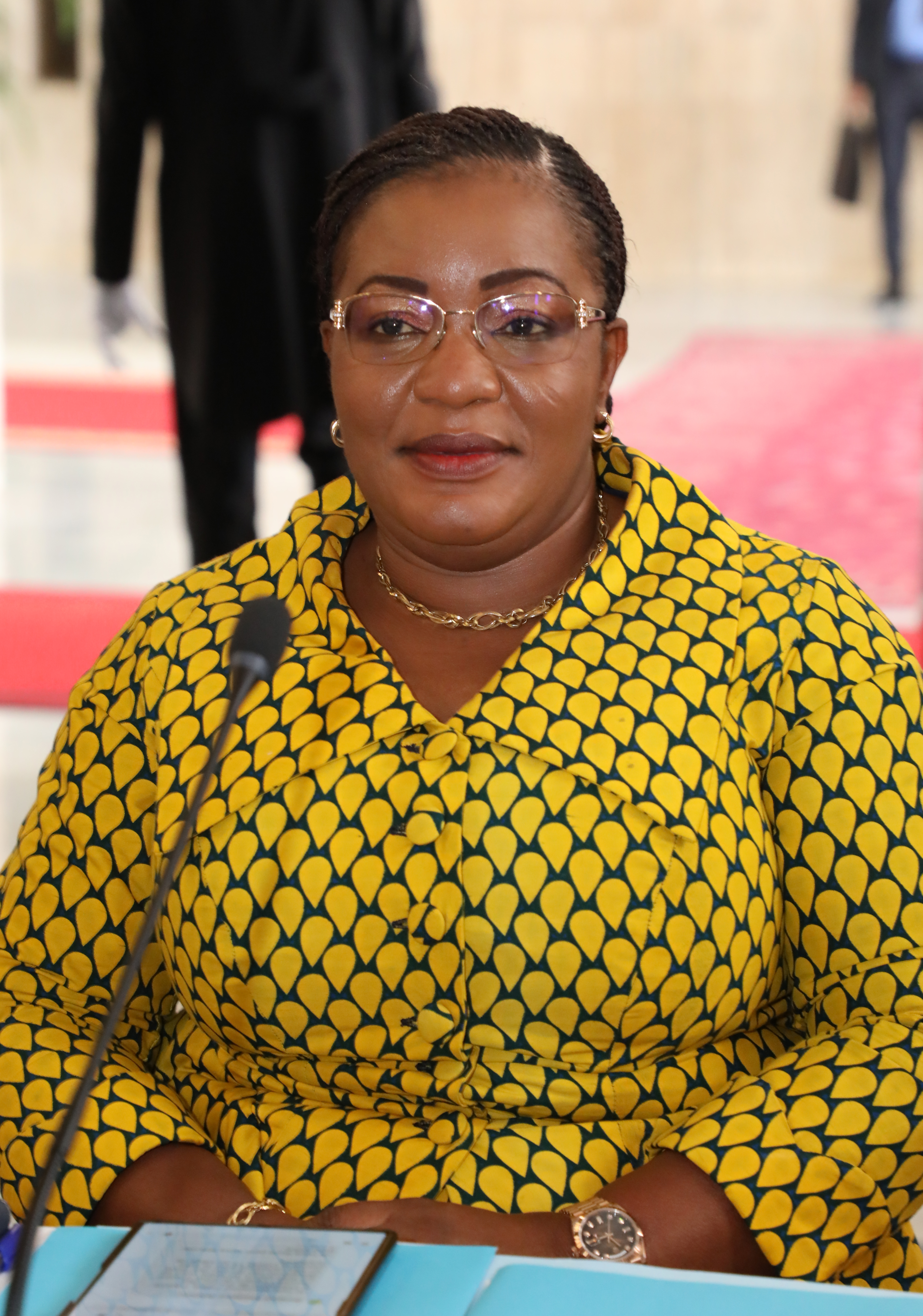

Minister of Culture and the Francophonie
- In office 6 April 2021 – 20 April 2022
- Preceded by: Raymonde Goudou Coffie
- Succeeded by: Françoise Remarck

Personal details
- Born: 20 December 1978 (age 47)
- Party: Rally of Houphouëtists for Democracy and Peace
- Children: 3

Harlette Badou NʼGuessan Kouamé (born 20 December 1978) is an Ivorian politician and civil servant. She was Minister of Culture and the Francophonie from 2021 to 2022 and has served as president of the National Union of Women of the Rally of Houphouëtists for Democracy and Peace (RHDP) political alliance since 2024.

== Biography ==
Badou studied a degree in Communication and Business Negotiation from School of Communication and Management (ESCG) in Brussels, Belgium.

After a career in the telecommunications sector in Ivory Coast, Badou began a career in politics. In April 2021, Badou was appointed as Minister of Culture and the Francophonie, succeeding Raymonde Goudou Coffie. In April 2022, she was succeeded by Françoise Remarck [fr].

In 2024, Badou was elected as vice-president of the Union of Cities and Municipalities of Côte d'Ivoire (French: l’Union des Villes et Communes de Côte d’Ivoire, UVICOCI). Also in 2024, she was elected president of the National Union of Women of the Rally of Houphouëtists for Democracy and Peace (UF-RHDP) political alliance, running against five other candidates and securing 79.64% of the vote.
