= Anne Gnahouret Tatret =

Ivorian politician

Anne Gnahouret Tatret is an Ivorian politician. Whilst finishing her legal studies in 1978, Gnahouret became the head of the legal department of the autonomous port of San-Pédro. She worked there until 2000, also pursuing a political career. She joined the Ivorian Popular Front (FPI) under the patronage of Émile Boga Doudou. From 2002, she served as a diplomat, being the Ivorian ambassador to Angola, Mexico and Cuba. She was included on a 2011 list of Ivorian politicians against which the European Union had laid sanctions.

In 2019, ahead of the 2020 Ivorian presidential election, Pascal Affi N'Guessan made her vice-president of Lakota Department of the Lôh-Djiboua district. After the elections, Gnahouret became head of the Women's Organization of the Ivorian Popular Front (OFFPI). She had supported Angélique Kili, the wife of N'Guessan, when he had been arrested for one night.
