= Union for Ivory Coast =

Political party in Ivory Coast

Union for Ivory Coast Union pour la Côte d’Ivoire
- Abbreviation: UPCI
- Leader: Me Brahima Soro
- Founded: 2009
- Ideology: Social liberalism
- Political position: Centre
- Colours: Orange
- Seats in the National Assembly: 0 / 255

The Union for Ivory Coast (French: Union pour la Côte d’Ivoire; abbreviated UPCI) is political party in the Ivory Coast led by former Me Brahima Soro. It was part of the Rally of Houphouëtists for Democracy and Peace alliance in the 2011 elections, but ran independently in the parliamentary elections in 2016, where it won three seats.
