= Amadou Soumahoro =

Ivorian politician (1953–2022)

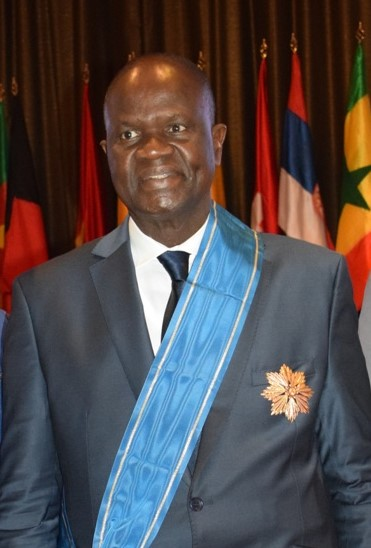
- Soumahoro in 2019

President of the Assemblée parlementaire de la Francophonie
- In office 9 July 2019 – 7 May 2022
- Preceded by: François Paradis

President of the National Assembly of Ivory Coast
- In office 7 March 2019 – 7 May 2022
- Preceded by: Guillaume Soro
- Succeeded by: Adama Bictogo (acting)

Personal details
- Born: 31 October 1953 Séguéla, French Ivory Coast, French West Africa
- Died: 7 May 2022 (aged 68) Abidjan, Ivory Coast
- Party: RHDP
- Education: Université Félix Houphouët-Boigny; Institut français des relations internationales

Amadou Soumahoro (31 October 1953 – 7 May 2022) was an Ivorian politician. He served in the National Assembly constituency of Séguéla and was President of the National Assembly from 7 March 2019 until his death on 7 May 2022. He also served as President of the Assemblée parlementaire de la Francophonie from 9 July 2019 until his death.

== Biography ==
Amadou was the son of Democratic Party of Ivory Coast – African Democratic Rally (PDCI-RDA) politician Losseni Soumahoro, and was the second of four children. He attended secondary school at the Lycée technique d'Abidjan and obtained a baccalauréat in social economics. He was admitted to the Université Félix Houphouët-Boigny and the Institut français des relations internationales, where he earned a degree in international commerce in 1979. In 1982, he moved to Switzerland and studied development of commercial relations at the International Center Cointrin.

=== Political career ===
From 1986 to 1990, Soumahoro led the activity coordination committee of the PDCI-RDA in the department of Séguéla. He then worked at the party headquarters from 1990 to 1993 while serving as a member of the municipal council of Séguéla from 1991 to 1994. On 27 June 1994, he became a founding member of the Rally of the Republicans and was its acting secretary-general from July 2011 to September 2017. He also served as president of the board of directors of the Rally of Houphouëtists for Democracy and Peace (RHDP) from February 2015 to September 2017.

==== Municipal and legislative office ====
From 1996 to 2013, Soumahoro was mayor of Séguéla. On 11 December 2011, he was elected to represent the town in the National Assembly. On 7 March 2019, he was elected to serve as the 7th President of the National Assembly, succeeding Guillaume Soro. In January 2022, Adama Bictogo took on his responsibilities in this office. Upon Soumahoro's death, Bictogo became acting President of the National Assembly.
