= 2021 Ivorian parliamentary election =

- 6 March 2021
- All 255 seats in the National Assembly; 128 seats needed for a majority
- Turnout: 37.86% (▲3.75pp)
Party	Leader	Vote %	Seats	+/–
RHDP	Alassane Ouattara	48.64	139	−28
PDCI-RDA–EDS	Bédié and Ouégnin	16.29	50	New
PDCI–RDA	Henri Konan Bédié	5.96	23	New
EDS	Georges-Armand Ouégnin	4.40	8	New
FPI	Pascal Affi N'Guessan	1.93	2	−1
UDPCI/Arc-en-ciel	Albert Toikeusse Mabri	1.51	7	+1
FPI/AFD/UDPCI/Arc-en-ciel	Albert Toikeusse Mabri	2.01	1	
Independents	–	18.74	25	−51
This lists parties that won seats. See the complete results below.
Prime Minister before	Prime Minister after
Hamed Bakayoko; RDR	Patrick Achi; RDR

Parliamentary elections were held in Ivory Coast on 6 March 2021. The previous elections, held in 2016, saw the presidential coalition (the Rally of Houphouëtists for Democracy and Peace, composed of the Rally of the Republicans, the Democratic Party of Ivory Coast – African Democratic Rally, and some minor parties) win more than the half the seats in the National Assembly.

== Electoral system ==
The National Assembly is the lower house of the bicameral parliament. Of its 255 members, 169 are elected in single-member constituencies by first-past-the-post voting and the remaining 86 are elected from 36 constituencies of between two and six seats by general ticket voting, with the list of candidates that receives the most votes winning all seats to be filled.

Following a decree in November 2020, 30% of the total candidates from each party must be women. The decree also encourages parties to present more by providing additional public funding to those whose share of female candidates exceeds 50%.

== Results ==
Rally of Houphouëtists for Democracy and Peace (RHDP) won 137 of 254 contested seats in the election, according to official results. Union for Democracy and Peace in Ivory Coast (UDPCI) claimed fraud and the Ivorian Popular Front (FPI) appealed for calm. One seat remained open on March 10 because a candidate died during the campaign. The elections were peaceful and turnout was 37.86%, with 2,793,947 voters participating out of 7,379,640 registered. There were 83,021 null ballots and 34,198 blank ballots.

After the death of a candidate in Constituency 97, the election was postponed and held on 24 April 2021. Five constituencies had reruns on 12 June 2021.

Patrick Achi was named interim Prime Minister on March 8, during the illness of Hamed Bakayoko. Bakayoko died of cancer on March 10.

The largest opposition grouping will mostly likely be a coalition formed by Henri Konan Bedie′s UPDCI and Laurent Gbagbo's FPI, which won 50 seats.

Party	Votes	%	Seats
Rally of Houphouëtists for Democracy and Peace	1,318,715	48.64	139
Democratic Party of Ivory Coast/Together for Democracy and Sovereignty	441,691	16.29	50
Democratic Party of Ivory Coast	161,601	5.96	23
Together for Democracy and Sovereignty	119,360	4.40	8
Ivorian Popular Front	52,343	1.93	2
UDPCI/Arc-en-ciel	40,949	1.51	7
Ivorian Popular Front/AFD/UDPCI/Arc-en-ciel	12,877	0.48	1
For the Republic and Democracy	2,417	0.09	0
Republican Union for Democracy	2,053	0.08	0
Rally of Democrats of Ivory Coast	1,810	0.07	0
Rally for Peace and Agreement	1,694	0.06	0
1,000 Volunteers	1,600	0.06	0
Union of Democrats for Progress	1,146	0.04	0
Party for African Integration	1,016	0.04	0
Rally for Peace and Agreement/Group of Political Partners for Peace	911	0.03	0
Ecological Party of Ivory Coast	822	0.03	0
Strength to the Peoples	681	0.03	0
Alliance for Democracy Movement	589	0.02	0
Serving Ivory Coast	587	0.02	0
National Civic Movement	533	0.02	0
New Union for Ivory Coast	464	0.02	0
People's Party of Social Democrats	405	0.01	0
Democratic and Civic Union	402	0.01	0
Party for Progress and Socialism	392	0.01	0
Ivorian Ecological Party	300	0.01	0
National, Democratic and Reformist Front	263	0.01	0
Congress for an Ivorian and Pan-African Renaissance	248	0.01	0
Reform is Possible	246	0.01	0
Pan-African Congress for Renewal	244	0.01	0
People's Socialist Union	237	0.01	0
Union for Total Democracy in Ivory Coast	233	0.01	0
Union for National Progress	228	0.01	0
Group of Political Partners for Peace	194	0.01	0
Liberal Democratic Party	192	0.01	0
Ivorian Democratic Front	181	0.01	0
Pan-African Democratic Rally	175	0.01	0
Ivorian Centrist Alliance	143	0.01	0
Business and Farmers Party of Ivory Coast	118	0.00	0
National Integrity and Conscience	82	0.00	0
Democratic and Social Movement	79	0.00	0
Social Democrat Party	66	0.00	0
Ivorian Party of Challenges to Overcome	64	0.00	0
National Congress for the Development of Ivory Coast	57	0.00	0
Collective of Democratic Ivorians	55	0.00	0
National Reforming Party	53	0.00	0
Party of Democratic Rebirth and Development	46	0.00	0
Party of Republican Democrats	43	0.00	0
National Movement of Young Centrists	18	0.00	0
UNITE-AMOUR-PAIX	10	0.00	0
Independents	508,095	18.74	25
Blank votes	34,198	1.26	–
Total	2,710,926	100.00	255
Valid votes	2,710,926	97.03	
Invalid votes	83,021	2.97	
Total votes	2,793,947	100.00	
Registered voters/turnout	7,379,640	37.86	
Source: CEI
