= Lorougnon =

Lorougnon is both a given name and a surname. Notable people with the name include:

- Lorougnon Doukouo (born 2002), Ivorian footballer
- Lorougnon Christ Remi (born 1988), Ivorian footballer
- Marie-Odette Lorougnon, Ivorian politician
