= Djibril Coulibaly =

Djibril Coulibaly may refer to:

- Djibril Coulibaly (footballer, born 1987), Malian football forward
- Djibril Coulibaly (footballer, born 2008), French football midfielder for Nice

== See also ==
- Pierre Djibril Coulibaly (born 1957), Ivorian software engineer
