= 2015 Ivorian presidential election =

- 25 October 2015
- Turnout: 52.86%
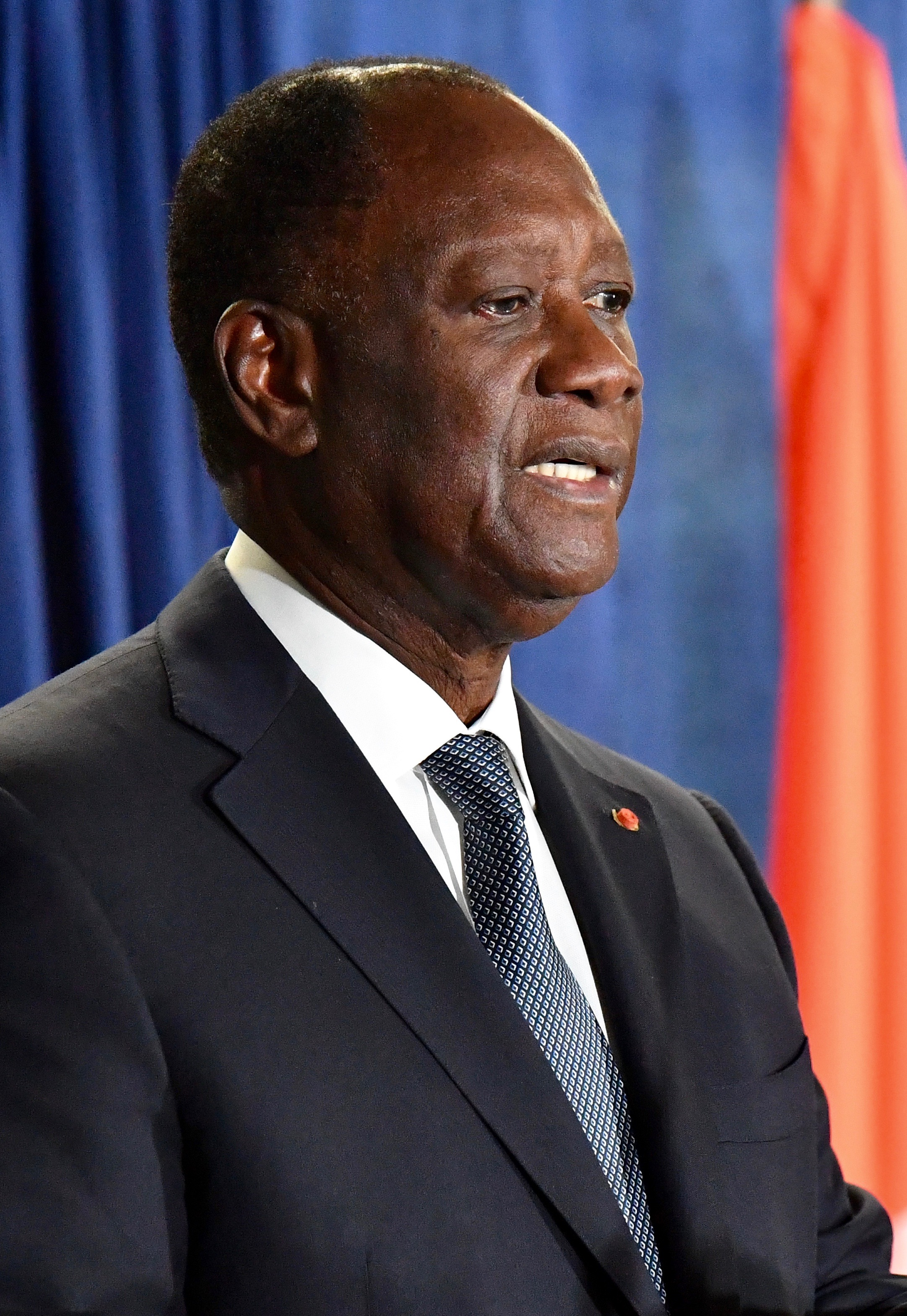

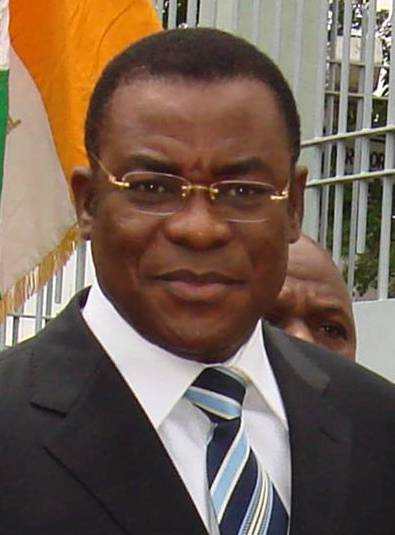
Nominee	Alassane Ouattara	Pascal Affi N'Guessan
Party	RHDP	AFD
Popular vote	2,618,229	290,780
Percentage	83.66%	9.29%
President before election
Alassane Ouattara
RDR
Elected President
Alassane Ouattara
RDR

Presidential elections were held in Ivory Coast on 25 October 2015. Alassane Ouattara won a second term in a landslide victory over his closest rival Pascal Affi N'Guessan.

== Campaign ==
The President of the Ivory Coast is elected with a five-year mandate through a two-round system, with 50% simple majority required to avoid a run-off. According to the 2000 Constitution of Ivory Coast, candidates are limited to two consecutive terms as president. Incumbent President Alassane Ouattara, first elected in 2010 preceding the 2010–11 Ivorian crisis, stood again to seek a second term.

Opposition party Ivorian Popular Front (FPI) called for a boycott of the elections in protest against the trial of former President Laurent Gbagbo by the International Criminal Court. Presidential candidate Pascal Affi N'Guessan denounced the incarceration of Gbagbo and political conditions under Ouattara:

"Peace isn't only the silence of weapons. Can we say that Ivory Coast is in peace when President Gbagbo is in The Hague? With hundreds of political prisoners in jail, Ivory Coast is not in peace."

Some hardliners in the FPI did not want to participate in elections as long as Gbagbo remained imprisoned, but others felt the party needed to remain engaged in the electoral process.

== Results ==
The vote was relatively peaceful, compared to the unrest that marred previous elections, although voter turnout was down to 54.6%. Outtara avoided a second round vote and won a second term in office after garnering 83.7%, in a landslide victory over his nearest rival Affi N'Guessan on 9.3%.

Candidate	Party	Votes	%
Alassane Ouattara	Rally of Houphouëtists for Democracy and Peace	2,618,229	83.66
Pascal Affi N'Guessan	Alliance of Democratic Forces	290,780	9.29
Konan Bertin Kouadio	Independent	121,386	3.88
Henriette Lagou Adjoua	Renewal for Peace and Concord	27,759	0.89
Siméon Konan Kouadio	Independent	22,117	0.71
Kacou Gnangbo	Independent	18,650	0.60
Jacqueline-Claire Kouangoua	Independent	12,398	0.40
Charles Konan Banny	Independent	8,667	0.28
Amara Essy	Independent	6,413	0.20
Mamadou Koulibaly	Liberty and Democracy for the Republic	3,343	0.11
Total		3,129,742	100.00
Valid votes		3,129,742	93.96
Invalid/blank votes		201,186	6.04
Total votes		3,330,928	100.00
Registered voters/turnout		6,301,189	52.86
Source: CEI
