= Yace =

Yace may be,

- Yace language (Yache)
- Philippe Yacé
