= 2025 Ivorian parliamentary election =

- 27 December 2025
- All 255 seats in the National Assembly; 128 seats needed for a majority
- Turnout: 35.07% (▼2.79pp)
Party	Leader	Vote %	Seats	+/–
RHDP	Alassane Ouattara	61.95	196	+57
PDCI–RDA	Tidjane Thiam	12.04	32	+9
FPI	Pascal Affi N'Guessan	0.48	1	−1
UNPR	Azoumana Moutaye	0.09	1	New
Le Buffle	Koffi Kouakou	0.04	1	New
Independents	—	22.24	24	−1
This lists parties that won seats. See the complete results below.
Prime Minister before
Robert Beugré Mambé; RDR

Parliamentary elections were held in Ivory Coast on 27 December 2025. The ruling Rally of Houphouëtists for Democracy and Peace won 197 of 255 seats in the National Assembly.

== Electoral system ==
The 255 members of the National Assembly are elected from 169 single-member constituencies and 36 multi-member constituencies with between two and six seats. In single-member constituencies voters cast a vote for one candidate who is elected by first-past-the-post voting, while in multi-member constituencies candidates were elected by plurality-at-large voting, where voters cast a single vote for a closed list, with the list receiving the most votes winning all seats in the constituency.

== Candidates ==
More than 2,700 candidates ran for office, including nearly 800 independents. The African People's Party – Côte d'Ivoire (PPA–CI), led by former president Laurent Gbagbo, boycotted the election and did not field any candidates.

== Campaign ==
The opposition PDCI-RDA accused supporters of the ruling RHDP of fraudulently gathering voter names, phone numbers, voter card details, and polling station information in exchange for cash payments of up to 300,000 CFA francs and the distribution of motorcycles as part of efforts to influence the election result. It also noted the disappearance of more than 25,000 voter cards in Port-Bouët.

== Results ==
Official reports from the Independent Electoral Commission (IEC) said that Rally of Houphouëtists for Democracy and Peace (RHDP) won 196 of the 255 seats in the election, 33 more seats than in the outgoing National Assembly. Turnout was reported to be 35%, two points lower than the last election. The main opposition Democratic Party of Ivory Coast (PDCI) saw its number of parliamentary seats halved from 66 to 32. 24 members of parliament were elected as independents, many of them dissidents from the RHDP. The RHDP mainly dominated its strongholds in the north, and made gains in southern and western regions that were historically loyal to the opposition. The PPA–CI, which boycotted the election, lost all of its seats.

Party	Votes	%	Seats	+/–
Rally of Houphouëtists for Democracy and Peace	1,825,244	61.95	196	+57
Democratic Party of Ivory Coast	354,618	12.04	32	+9
Democratic Party of Ivory Coast/Ivorian Popular Front/Today and Tomorrow, Ivory Coast	18,757	0.64	0	New
Ivorian Popular Front	14,164	0.48	1	–1
Today and Tomorrow, Ivory Coast	11,883	0.40	0	New
Today and Tomorrow, Ivory Coast/Group of Political Partners for Peace/VALEUR	7,489	0.25	0	New
Democratic Congress	4,149	0.14	0	New
Movement of Capable Generations	3,823	0.13	0	New
Together for Democracy and Sovereignty	3,387	0.11	0	–8
Democratic Party of Ivory Coast/Together for Democracy and Sovereignty	2,719	0.09	0	–50
Union for the Republic	2,571	0.09	1	New
Act for Institutions and Development	1,550	0.05	0	New
Group of Political Partners for Peace	1,253	0.04	0	0
Union of Democrats for Progress	1,209	0.04	0	0
Le Buffle – Victory for Development	1,159	0.04	1	New
National Democratic and Reformist Front	934	0.03	0	0
National Congress for the Development of Ivory Coast	881	0.03	0	0
National Movement for Reconciliation and Peace	727	0.02	0	New
Party for African Integration/Ivorian Renaissance Party/Democratic Congress	622	0.02	0	New
Ivorian Alliance for the Republic and Democracy	566	0.02	0	New
Democratic Movement for Renewal	542	0.02	0	New
People's Party of Social Democrats	492	0.02	0	0
Network of Free Voters of Ivory Coast	334	0.01	0	0
Union of Democratic Forces	289	0.01	0	New
New Union for Ivory Coast	249	0.01	0	0
Prosperity, Happiness and Joy of Living	219	0.01	0	New
Alliance for the Republic	214	0.01	0	New
Ivorian Centrist Alliance	193	0.01	0	0
Ivorian Movement for Democratic Renewal and the Emancipation of Peoples	179	0.01	0	New
Rally for Democracy and Peace	175	0.01	0	New
Movement for the Emergence of Republicans of Ivory Coast	164	0.01	0	New
Democratic and Citizen Union	141	0.00	0	New
National Patriotic Circle for a New ivory Coast	110	0.00	0	New
National Integrity and Conscience	94	0.00	0	0
Pro Ivory Coast	70	0.00	0	New
National Youth Convergence of Bafing for ADO	68	0.00	0	New
Union for the Promotion of Ivory Coast	68	0.00	0	New
Pan-African Patriotic Front	37	0.00	0	New
Government of Justice and Peace in Ivory Coast	35	0.00	0	New
Party for African Integration/Democratic Congress	35	0.00	0	New
Movement of Leaders for a Prosperous Ivory Coast	30	0.00	0	New
Congress for the Ivorian and Pan-African Renaissance	17	0.00	0	New
Independents	655,143	22.24	24	–1
Blank votes	29,640	1.01	–	–
Total	2,946,243	100.00	255	–
Valid votes	2,946,243	97.72		
Invalid votes	68,693	2.28		
Total votes	3,014,936	100.00		
Registered voters/turnout	8,597,092	35.07		
Source: CEI (main results) CEI (re-runs)
