= 1995 Ivorian parliamentary election =

- 26 November 1995
- All 175 seats in the National Assembly; 88 seats needed for a majority
Party	Leader	Seats	+/–
PDCI–RDA	Henri Konan Bédié	148	−15
RDR	Alassane Ouattara	14	New
FPI	Laurent Gbagbo	12	+3
This lists parties that won seats. See the complete results below.
Prime Minister before	Prime Minister after
Daniel Kablan Duncan; PDCI–RDA	Daniel Kablan Duncan; PDCI–RDA

Parliamentary elections were held in Ivory Coast on 26 November 1995. Ten parties and a number of independents contested the election, with the Rally of the Republicans and the Ivorian Popular Front running under the Republican Front banner. The result was a victory for the ruling Democratic Party of Ivory Coast – African Democratic Rally (PDCI-RDA), which won 148 of the 175 seats.

The results in seven constituencies were annulled following the election, and reruns held on 27 December. As a result, the PDCI-RDA increased its number of seats to 150, whilst the opposition were reduced to 25.

== Results ==
Party	Seats	+/–
Democratic Party of Ivory Coast	148	–15
Rally of the Republicans	14	New
Ivorian Popular Front	12	+3
Vacant	1	–
Total	175	0
Source: African Elections Database
