= Marie-Odette Lorougnon =

Ivorian politician

Member of the National Assembly
- In office 2000–2010

Vice President of Women Affairs

Personal details
- Party: Front populaire ivoirien (FPI) (until 2010) Parti des peuples africains – Côte d'Ivoire (PPA-CI) (from 2010 onwards)
- Occupation: Politician

Marie-Odette Lorougnon is an Ivorian politician who served as a member of the National Assembly of Ivory Coast from 2000 to 2010. She was a member of the Front populaire ivoirien (FPI) and held the position of Vice President in charge of women's affairs. She later joined the Parti des peuples africains – Côte d'Ivoire (PPA-CI).

== Distinction ==
December 8, 2021: RÉSILIENCE Award bestowed upon the Vice President of PPA-CI, Marie Odette Lorougnon, by the Elite Women Foundation, during the 11th edition of the Elite Women Gala.
