= Together for Democracy and Sovereignty =

Political party in Ivory Coast

Together for Democracy and Sovereignty Ensemble pour la démocratie et la souveraineté
- Abbreviation: EDS
- Leader: Georges Armand Ouégnin
- Founded: 21 April 2017
- Split from: Ivorian Popular Front
- Colours: Turquoise
- National Assembly: 0 / 255

Together for Democracy and Sovereignty (French: Ensemble pour la démocratie et la souveraineté; EDS) is an Ivorian political party. It was founded on 21 April 2017 after splitting from the Ivorian Popular Front and is led by Georges Armand Ouégnin.

The 18 deputies from EDS elected in March 2021 joined the African People's Party – Côte d'Ivoire at its founding in October 2021, and the EDS parliamentary group was dissolved.

== Election results ==
=== National Assembly ===
Year	Leader	Votes	%	Seats	+/-	Result
2021	Georges Armand Ouégnin	560,172	20.97 with PDCI-RDA	18 / 255	New	Opposition
2025	Georges Armand Ouégnin	3,387	0.11	0 / 255	▼18	Extra-parliamentary
