= Michel Amani N'Guessan =

Ivorian politician (born 1957)

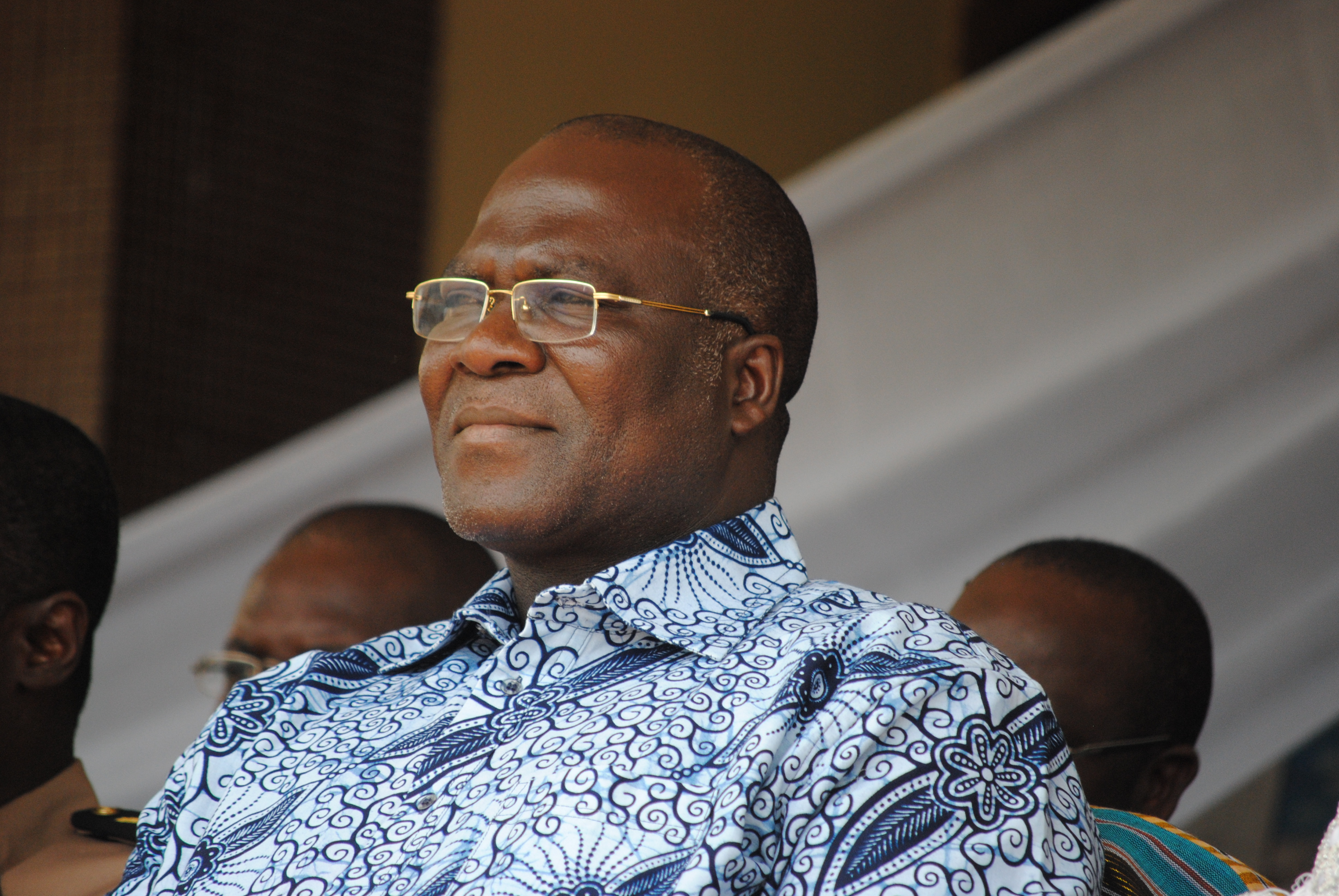

Minister of Defence
- In office April 7, 2007 – December 6, 2010
- Prime Minister: Guillaume Soro
- Preceded by: René Aphing Kouassi
- Succeeded by: Alain Dogou

Minister of National Education
- In office January 2000 – April 7, 2007
- President: Robert Guéï
- Succeeded by: Gilbert Bleu-Lainé

Personal details
- Born: 1957 (age 68–69) Messoukro, Cote d'Ivoire
- Party: Ivorian Popular Front
- Education: University of Abidjan
- Occupation: Politician, teacher

Michel Amani N'Guessan (born 1957) is an Ivorian politician and the former defence minister of Côte d'Ivoire for the Ivorian Popular Front (FPI).

== Biography ==
Born in Messoukro village in 1957, N'Guessan graduated from the University of Abidjan in 1984, with a specialisation in history and geography. He subsequently became a teacher and taught from 1985 to 1999, joining the FPI in 1990.

N'Guessan was appointed Minister of National Education in January 2000, during the military rule of Robert Guéï, and retained this post until April 7, 2007, when he assumed the position of defence minister.
