= Hubertine Rose Éholie =

Ivorian academic (1934–2019)

- Born: Hubertine Rose Traoré; 23 May 1934; French Ivory Coast (present-day Burkina Faso)
- Died: 11 May 2019 (aged 84); Ivory Coast

Academic background
- Education: University of Poitiers

Academic work
- Discipline: Chemistry
- Institutions: University of Abidjan

Hubertine Rose Éholie (23 May 1934 – 11 May 2019) was an Ivorian academic. Specialising in chemistry, she had a long career at the University of Abidjan. She retired by 2015 and was a critic of the gender gap of women in academia.

== Biography ==
Éholie was born on 23 May 1934, in Burkina Faso, then part of French Ivory Coast. She studied at the University of Poitiers and earned a higher education certificate in mathematics, physics, and chemistry in 1957, and a certificate of specialized studies in metallurgy, chemistry and physics in 1960. Éholie earned a Doctor of Engineering Science degree in 1966 and a State Doctorate in 1971 at the University of Abidjan.

Éholie taught at the Lycée classique d'Abidjan before a career at the University of Abidjan. She began as a teaching assistant before becoming an assistant lecturer and lecturer in the Faculty of the Sciences. She became a senior lecturer, professor and then tenured professor in the Faculty of Sciences and Techniques. She specialized in crystallography, electro-magnetics, glasses, the silver-arsenic-selenium system, semi-conductors and ternary compounds. She was elected a fellow of the Third World Academy of Sciences (now known as The World Academy of Sciences, TWAS), Sub-Saharan Africa Region in 1987 and was one of only 88 fellows elected from that region (as of 2017). She had retired by 2015.

Éholie wrote an article in 1988 for a Canadian International Development Agency and the Third World Academy of Sciences conference entitled "The role of women in the scientific and technological development of the third world: the case of Cote d'Ivoire". She was a critic of the gender gap of women in academia in the Côte d'Ivoire, particularly in the sciences.

Éholie died on 11 May 2019, aged 84, in the Côte d'Ivoire.

== See also ==
- Third World Academy of Sciences
- Canadian International Development Agency
- University of Abidjan
