= Union for Democracy and Peace in Ivory Coast =

Political party in Ivory Coast

Union for Democracy and Peace in Ivory Coast Union pour la démocratie et la paix en Côte d'Ivoire
- Abbreviation: UDPCI
- Leader: Toikeuse Mabri
- Founder: Robert Guéï
- Founded: 2001
- Ideology: Economic liberalism Liberalism; Social liberalism
- Political position: Centre
- Seats in the National Assembly: 8 / 255

The Union for Democracy and Peace in Ivory Coast (French: Union pour la démocratie et la paix en Côte d'Ivoire; UDPCI) is a political party in Ivory Coast, led by Toikeuse Mabri. In the 2011 parliamentary election, the party won 7 seats. In the 2016 parliamentary election, the party won 6 seats. The party tends to see more support among the Dan people.
