= Daniel Aka Ahizi =

Ivorian politician

Daniel Aka Ahizi (born December 11, 1953, in Bingerville) is an Ivorian politician. He is a member of the Ivorian Workers' Party. He is the National Secretary for Finance and resource mobilization and the current Minister of Environment, Water, and Forestry. He was named to the Ministry of Environment, Water, and Forestry in 2006 following the mass resignation of the previous administration in response to the 2006 Ivory Coast toxic waste dump scandal.
