= Philippe Yacé =

Ivorian politician (1920–1998)

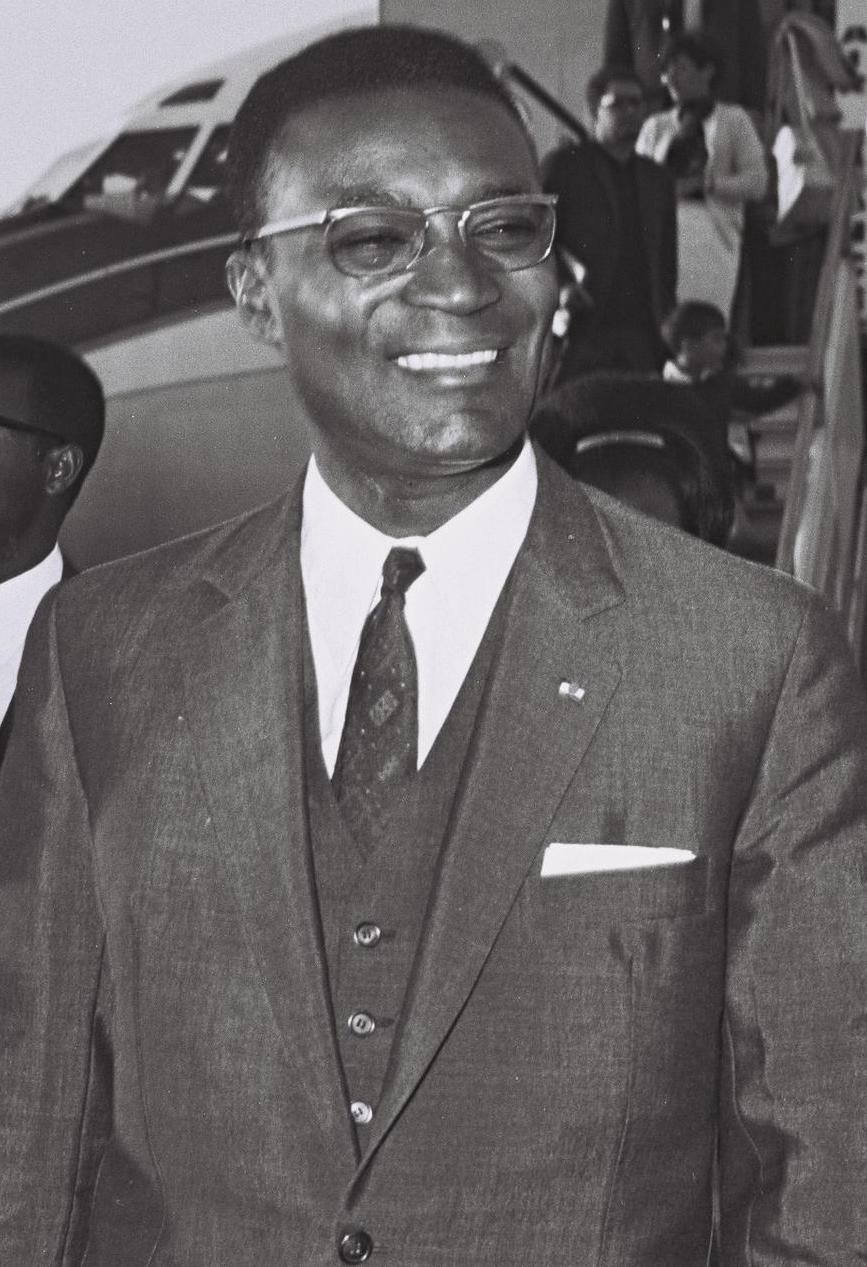
Philippe Yacé, August 1966

Philippe Grégoire Yacé (January 23, 1920 – November 29, 1998) was an Ivorian politician and one time president of the National Assembly.

A teacher by training, Yacé was among the founders of a trade union for instructors; he also served as the secretary general of the country's lone political party, the PDCI, for 15 years before the post was abolished. He was president of the Legislative Assembly and of the National Assembly, and from 1980 headed the High Court. He then served as the president of the economic and social council up until his death in 1998. He also served as mayor of Jacqueville, a deputy for the same constituency, a senator, and the spiritual leader of the "3A" (the alladian, aïzi, and akouri). He was the so-called "dauphin" of Félix Houphouët-Boigny, with whom he collaborated closely for much of his career, and it was widely expected that he would be Houphouët-Boigny's successor upon the former's retirement. But the elder statesman became wary of the influence Yacé was wielding, and in 1980 effectively disowned him, ending his political career.

Yacé died in Abidjan in 1998.
