= Alliance of Democratic Forces =

The Alliance of Democratic Forces (French: Alliance des forces démocratiques, AFD) is a political alliance in Ivory Coast led by the Ivorian Popular Front (FPI).

== History ==
The alliance was established on 26 March 2014 in order to contest the 2015 presidential elections, succeeding the National Congress of Resistance for Democracy. It was formed by 12 parties: the FPI, the Ivorian Workers' Party, the Rally for Peace, Progress and Participation, the Ivorian Alliance for the Republic and Democracy, the Ivorian Congress for Development and Peace, the New Alliance of Ivory Coast for the Homeland, the Rally for Democracy and Peace, the Union of Democrats for Progress, the Union for Total Democracy in Ivory Coast, the Republican Union for Democracy, the Union of New Generations and the Party for Ivory Coast.

The alliance nominated Pascal Affi N'Guessan of the FPI as its candidate for the presidential elections. He finished second with 9% of the vote as incumbent President Alassane Ouattara was re-elected with 84% of the vote.
