= Laurent Akoun =

Ivorian politician

Laurent Akoun (born 1954) is an Ivorian politician. He is a member of the Ivorian Popular Front (FPI).

He was Secretary General of the National Union of Teachers in Côte d'Ivoire (SYNESCI) from 1980 to 1983. He was then a member of the Ivorian Workers' Party until his imprisonment in 1992. On release, he became a member of the Secretariat of the FPI in 1993. He was elected member of the FPI in the town of Alépé in December 2000. He was appointed President of the Security and Defense Committee in the National Assembly in January 2001. He has been Secretary General of FPI since July 2001.
