= Paulette Badjo Ezouehu =

Ivorian politician

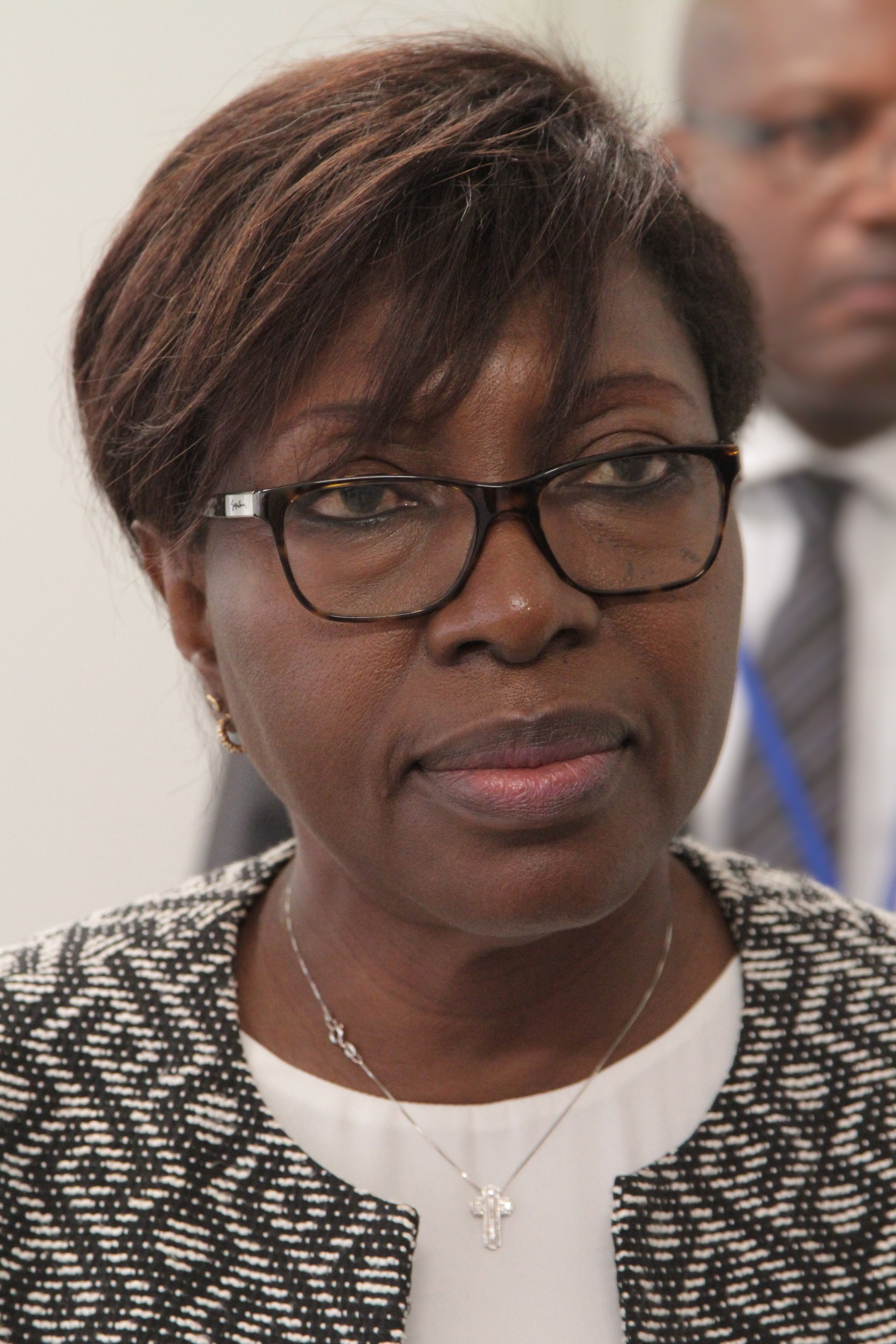

politician
- Minister: Minister of Human rights and Public Liberties of the Republic of the Ivory Coast

Personal details
- Citizenship: Ivory Coast
- Awards: Officer of the National Order of Ivorian Merit

Paulette Badjo Ezouehu is a politician who was the Minister of Human rights and Public Liberties of the Republic of the Ivory Coast from January 2016 to January 2017. Ezouehu also chaired the National Commission of Inquiry into the atrocities and crimes committed during the 2011 Second Ivorian Civil War.

== Awards ==
- Officer of the National Order of Ivorian Merit
