= Mamadou Koulibaly =

Ivorian politician (born 1957)

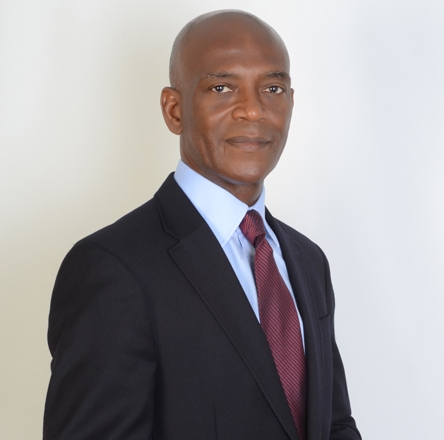
Mamadou Koulibaly

Mamadou Koulibaly (born 21 April 1957) is an Ivorian politician, Chairman of LIDER (Liberté et Démocratie pour la République), a classical liberal political party he founded in July 2011. Previously, he was President of the National Assembly of Côte d'Ivoire from 2001 to 2011, Minister of the Budget in 2000 and Minister of Economy and Finance from 2000 to 2001. For years, he was leading member of the Ivorian Popular Front (FPI), briefly leading the party in an interim capacity in 2011 before quitting it.

== Political career ==
A Muslim and a native of the north of Côte d'Ivoire, Koulibaly was born at Azaguié-Gare and studied economics, becoming an economist and economics professor. Under the transitional military regime of Robert Guéï, Koulibaly served in the government as Minister of the Budget from 15 January 2000 to 18 May 2000, then as Minister of the Economy and Finances from 18 May 2000 to January 2001. When Guéï was ousted following the disputed results of the October 2000 presidential election and FPI leader Laurent Gbagbo was sworn in as president, Koulibaly retained his post as Minister of the Economy and Finances, while gaining the role of Government Spokesman. He remained in those posts until 15 January 2001.

Koulibaly stood as an FPI candidate in the December 2000 parliamentary election and was elected to the National Assembly from Koumassi constituency. He was then elected as President of the National Assembly on 22 January 2001 without opposition. Another FPI deputy, Emile Boga Doudou, was also a candidate, but withdrew prior to the vote. The opposition Democratic Party of Côte d'Ivoire (PDCI) supported Koulibaly's candidacy as a gesture of cooperation.

In the aftermath of the 2002–2003 civil war, in which rebels failed to unseat Gbagbo but seized control of the north of the country, Koulibaly was noted as one of the main hard-line FPI figures surrounding Gbagbo who were hostile to the Marcoussis peace accord and despised opposition leader Alassane Ouattara. He was closely associated with Simone Gbagbo, who was Gbagbo's wife as well as President of the FPI Parliamentary Group. Alleged coup plotters led by Ibrahim Coulibaly were said to have conspired to kill Koulibaly along with President Gbagbo and Gbagbo's wife before being thwarted in August 2003.

After President Gbagbo extended National Assembly's parliamentary mandate in January 2005, contrary to the wishes of United Nations mediators, Koulibaly strongly criticized the United Nations Operation in Côte d'Ivoire (UNOCI) in an interview with the newspaper Le Courrier that was published on 1 February 2006. According to Koulibaly, UNOCI had ceased to play a positive role in the resolving the Ivorian conflict and was only exacerbating the situation.

In June 2010, Koulibaly accused Désiré Tagro—the Minister of the Interior and another top ally of Gbagbo—of embezzling money and showing regional favoritism regarding admissions to a training school for the police. Gbagbo ordered an investigation into the allegations; in July 2010, the investigation judged that the allegations were without merit, and Tagro, who continued to enjoy Gbagbo's favor, was ultimately unscathed by the episode.

Following the second round of the October–November 2010 presidential election, both Gbagbo and Ouattara claimed victory. Although his claim to victory was rejected by regional and international institutions, Gbagbo was promptly sworn in for a new term on 4 December 2010. Koulibaly was notably absent from the hastily arranged swearing-in ceremony, raising some eyebrows. In an interview a few days later, Koulibaly explained that he had been out of the country at the time. Regarding the severe political controversy that had erupted between Gbagbo and Ouattara, Koulibaly urged calm and stressed that the dispute should be peacefully resolved through the creation of a national unity government. He said that was the method settled upon for the resolution of post-election disputes in Africa and he said that it should be done quickly.

Koulibaly attempted to resolve the situation through dialogue and met with Ouattara, but his efforts came to nothing. Although known as a long-time Gbagbo loyalist, he did not actively take sides in the conflict. As the political dispute turned violent and the two sides battled in Abidjan in March–April 2011, Koulibaly went to neighboring Ghana. After Ouattara's forces captured Gbagbo and effectively took control of Abidjan on 11 April, Koulibaly returned to Abidjan on 19 April 2011. He met with Ouattara on 20 April and discussed the situation, especially the need to constitutionally normalize it by formally swearing in Ouattara as president and putting Ouattara's orders through the National Assembly. Ouattara appeared willing to leave the existing National Assembly, dominated by the FPI and chaired by Koulibaly, in place for the time being. Koulibaly also complained that his homes had been looted, his family had been threatened, and the National Assembly's offices had been damaged. He stressed reconciliation and expressed concern regarding persecution of FPI members and attacks on members of Gbagbo's Bété ethnic group.

FPI President Pascal Affi N'Guessan was arrested soon after Gbagbo's capture, and consequently Koulibaly took over the party leadership as Acting President. Responding to Ouattara's stated willingness to include moderate Gbagbo supporters in a national unity government, Koulibaly said on 25 May 2011 that the FPI would consider such participation only if Gbagbo and others who supported him were released.

Koulibaly finally resigned on 12 July 2011 over the unwillingness of hardline members of the FPI to accept Ouattara's victory and take steps to form a credible political opposition party, LIDER.

=== Party positions ===
Koulibaly was the FPI's Deputy Secretary-General in charge of Economic Questions and West African Integration before becoming one of the party's Vice-Presidents.
