= Raymonde Coffie =

Ivorian politician

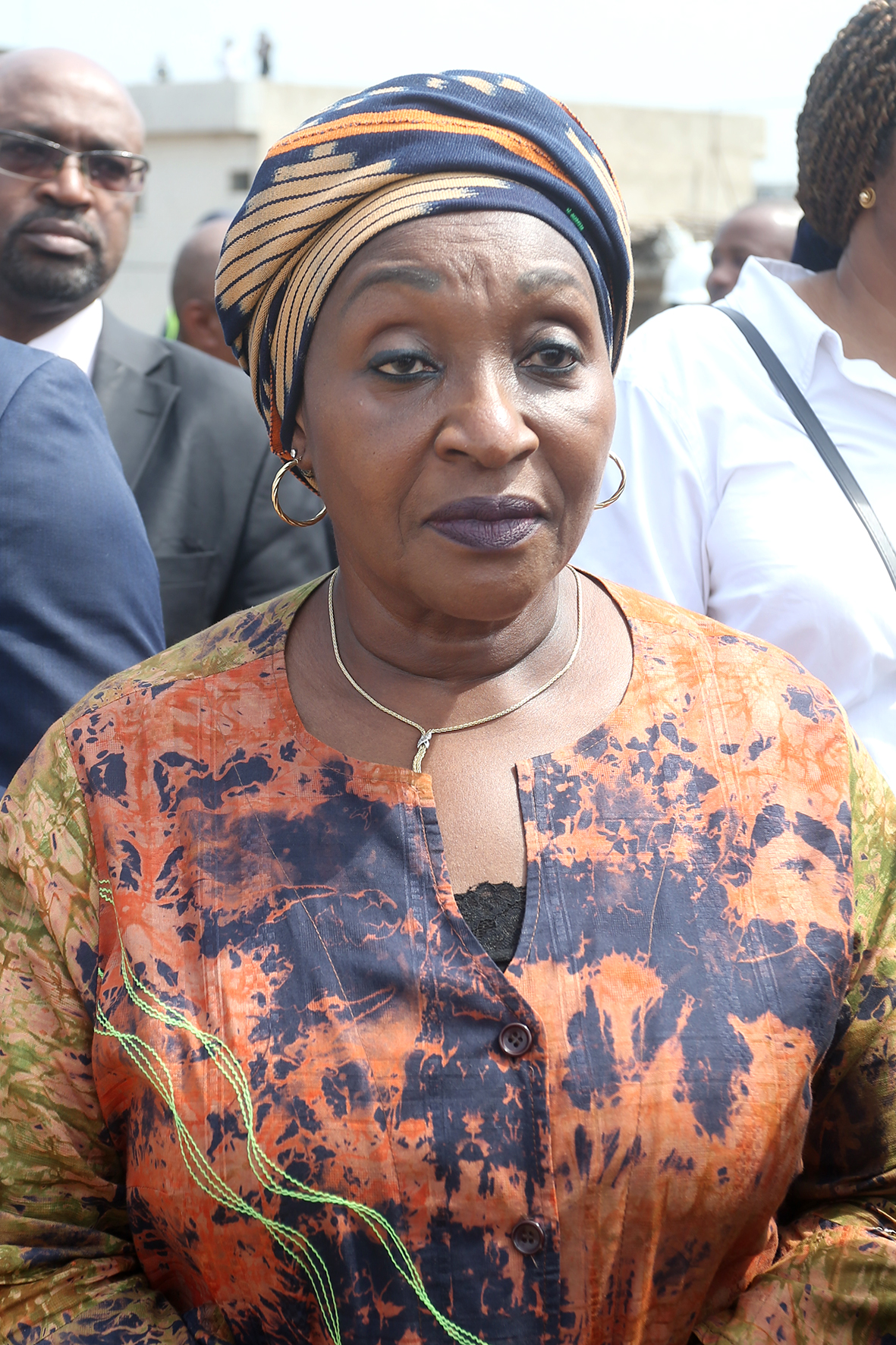

Raymonde Goudou Coffie (born c. 1965) is an Ivorian politician. After training as a pharmacist, she has held various ministerial appointments including Minister for Family, Women and Children, Minister of Health and Public Hygiene and Minister of Modernisation of Administration and Innovation of Public Services. In 2021, she became Minister Governor of the District des Lacs.

== Career ==
Raymonde Coffie was born c. 1965 to an Ivorian mother and a Guadeloupean father. She qualified as a pharmacist after studying at the University of Caen in France, then was head pharmacist at Yamoussoukro hospital from 1984 until 1986.

She then joined the PDCI (Democratic Party of Ivory Coast – African Democratic Rally). In 2011, she was made Minister for Family, Women and Children and the following year she became Minister of Health and Public Hygiene. She held the position until 2018, dealing with the threat of ebola and eradicating guinea worm and polio in the country. Immunisation rates were affected by the Second Ivorian Civil War. She joined the board of the Global Alliance for Vaccines and Immunization (GAVI) and in 2018 was appointed Minister of Modernisation of Administration and Innovation of Public Services. She introduced an online portal called Miliê the following year. Coffie was then made Minister of Culture and Francophonie and in 2021 became Minister Governor of the District des Lacs.

== Awards and recognition ==
Coffie has received accolades such as Commander in the Sovereign Military Order of Malta, Officer in the National Order of Côte d’Ivoire, Commander in the Order of Health and Commander in the Ivorian Order of Cultural Merit. Jeune Afrique called her one of the twenty most influential women in Côte d'Ivoire in 2017.
