= Pascale Guiton =

Microbiology teacher and researcher

- Born: Abidjan, Ivory Coast
- Education: Georgia State University (BA); Washington University in St. Louis (Ph.D)
- Occupations: microbiologist, assistant professor, academic
- Employer(s): California State University, East Bay; Santa Clara University

Pascale Guiton is a microbiologist and assistant professor at Santa Clara University, where she focuses on both teaching and research. She specializes in parasitology, particularly the study of Toxoplasma gondii. She is the founder and namesake for Guiton Lab, a student laboratory at Santa Clara University that studies Toxoplasma gondii in "a safe and collaborative environment".

== Early life and education ==
Pascale Guiton grew up in Abidjan, Ivory Coast, where she developed an interest in science through plant and animal dissections.

From 2002 to 2005, she pursued a bachelor of science in biological sciences at Georgia State University, where she graduated summa cum laude. In 2012, she earned a doctor of philosophy in biology and biomedical sciences from Washington University in St. Louis. Her dissertation was on infection rates of E. coli and E. faecalis in catheter patients. Subsequently, she was a postdoctoral fellowship in parasitology from Stanford University School of Medicine.

== Research and academic career ==
After completing her postdoctoral fellowship, Guiton served as a consultant on course videos at Stanford. During this time, she co-authored papers on urinary tract infections in laboratory mice. She left in 2016 to serve as an adjunct lecturer at San Jose State University, teaching Human Biology for a year, then became an assistant professor at California State University, East Bay from 2017 to 2022. She is currently an assistant professor at Santa Clara University. While there, she founded the Guiton Lab, a parasitology laboratory dedicated to studying Toxoplasma gondii. Her research focuses on parasite-host interactions and potential treatments.

== Contributions to diversity and inclusivity ==
Guiton actively promotes the inclusion of people of color in scientific research and education. In 2021, she delivered an oral history for Virginia Tech on being mixed race, hoer role in both African and African-American communities, and her aim to promote racial diversity in science. That same year, she wrote a paper in the journal mSphere on her own experiences with discrimination, urging educators to work towards promoting diversity.

Guiton has spoken out about the lack of research surrounding parasites that disproportionately affect black communities, such as Trichomonas vaginalis. She has spoken at panels and contributed to discussions on the systemic gaps in parasitology research, emphasizing the need for more diverse perspectives in science.

== Works ==
- Guiton, P. S. (2012). Molecular Insights into the Uropathogenesis of Enterococcus faecalis and Escheria coli in the Context of Urinary Catheterization. All Theses and Dissertations.
- Guiton, P. S. (2021). MSPhere of Influence: No More Excuses—Addressing Race, Racism, and Socioeconomic Issues in the science classroom and Laboratory. mSphere, 6(1). doi:10.1128/msphere.00010-21
