= Ahoua Don Mello =

Ivorian politician (born 1958)

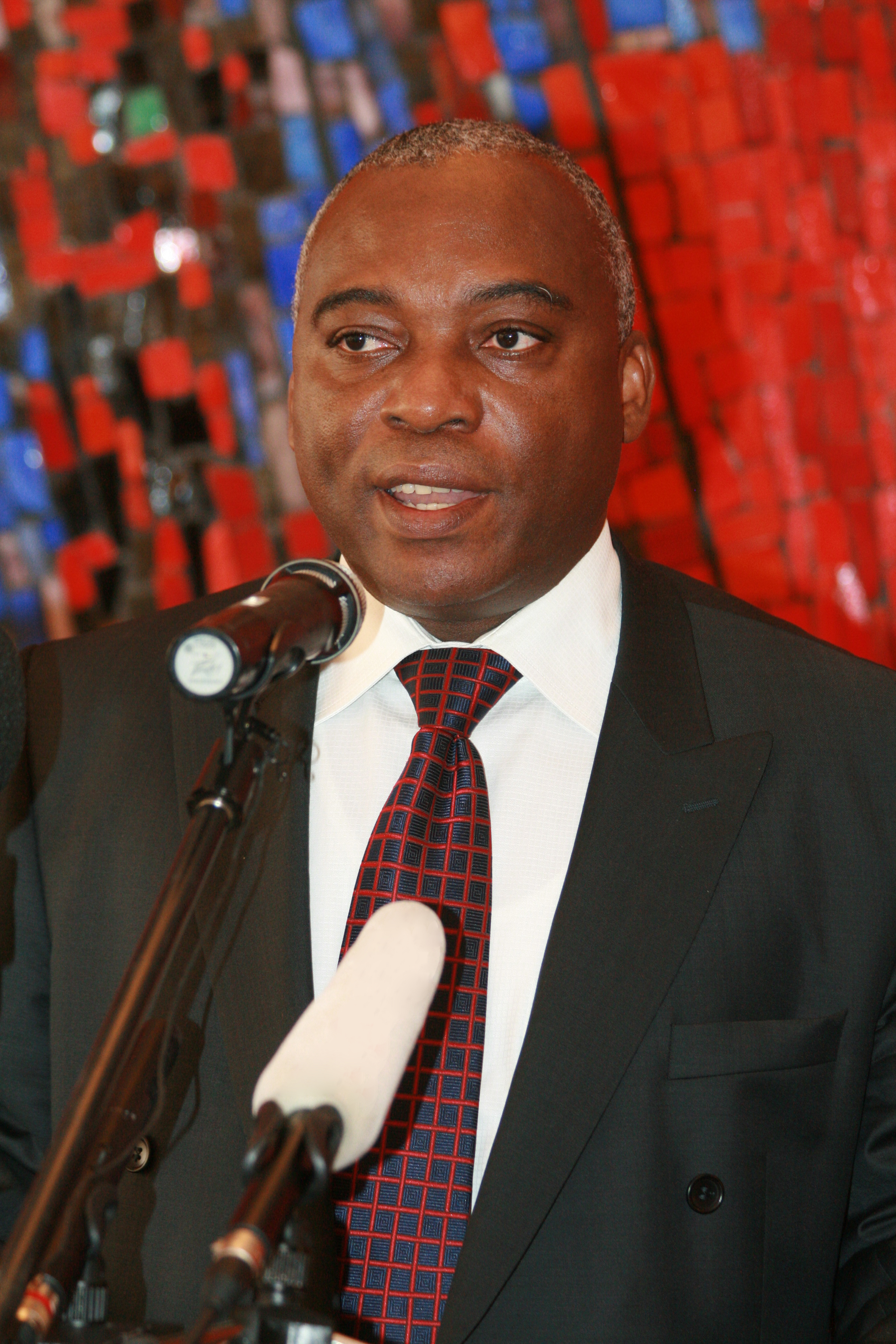
Ahoua Don Mello

Don Mello (born June 23 1958) is an Ivorian teacher-researcher and politician.

== Career ==
Mello was the Director General of the National Bureau of Technical and Development Studies from 2000 to 2011.

During the 2025 Ivorian presidential election, Mello ran as an independent candidate.
