= Henriette Lagou Adjoua =

Ivorian politician

- Born: June 22, 1959 (age 66); Côte d'Ivoire
- Occupation: Politician

Henriette Lagou Adjoua (born June 22, 1959) is a former minister and a politician from Côte d'Ivoire. She was one of the first two women to run for president in Côte d'Ivoire, during the 2015 presidential election (alongside Jacqueline-Claire Kouangoua, who achieved a lower result).

== Biography ==
Henriette Lagou Adjoua, born on June 22, 1959, is a member of the PDCI, but she allied herself with the National Congress for Resistance and Democracy (CNRD), close to President Laurent Gbagbo. After being its godmother, she is now the president of the movement "two million girls for Gbagbo." Henriette Lagou has also been the president of the board of directors of Air Ivoire. During the votes for the third constitution of Côte d'Ivoire, she declared herself in favor of the "No" vote. In an interview with the Ivorian daily newspaper, she protested in these terms: "we say no, to the fraud." In January 2022, her daughter, serving as a diplomat at the Ivorian embassy in Switzerland, died following a malaise.

== Presidential candidacy ==
On May 12, 2014, Henriette Lagou announced her candidacy for the 2015 presidential election.

On August 10, 2015, she became the fourth candidate to officially submit her application.

On September 9, 2015, her candidacy was validated by the Constitutional Council.

She ultimately received 27,759 votes, or 0.89% of the votes cast.
