= Guillaume Soro =

Ivorian politician

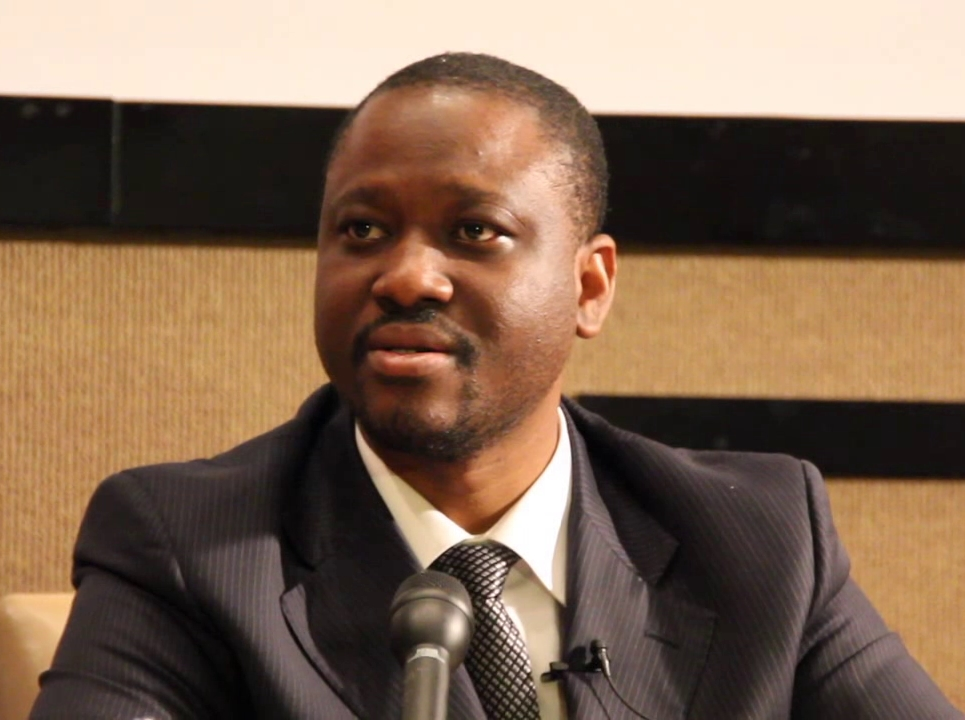
- Soro in 2011

President of the National Assembly
- In office 12 March 2012 – 8 February 2019
- Preceded by: Mamadou Koulibaly
- Succeeded by: Amadou Soumahoro

7th Prime Minister of the Ivory Coast
- In office 4 April 2007 – 13 March 2012*
- President: Laurent Gbagbo; Alassane Ouattara
- Preceded by: Charles Konan Banny
- Succeeded by: Jeannot Ahoussou-Kouadio

Minister of Defence
- In office 11 April 2011 – 13 March 2012
- Preceded by: Amani N'Guessan
- Succeeded by: Alassane Ouattara

Leader of the Patriotic Movement
- Incumbent
- Assumed office 20 December 2005
- Preceded by: Party established

Personal details
- Born: 8 May 1972 (age 53) Diawala, Ivory Coast
- Political party: Patriotic Movement
- The office of Prime Minister was disputed between Soro and Gilbert Aké from 6 December 2010 to 11 April 2011.

Guillaume Kigbafori Soro (born 8 May 1972) is an Ivorian politician who was the Prime Minister of Côte d'Ivoire from April 2007 to March 2012. Prior to his service as Prime Minister, Soro led the Patriotic Movement of Côte d'Ivoire, and later the New Forces as its Secretary-General. In March 2012, Soro became President of the National Assembly of Côte d'Ivoire. He stepped down from that position in February 2019, announcing in June 2019 that he is running to succeed President Alassane Ouattara.

== Biography ==
Soro is a Sénoufo from Ferkessédougou (northern Côte d'Ivoire) and is of the Catholic faith. Father of 4 children, he shares his life with Sylvie Tagro. His father was a member of the Democratic Party of Côte d'Ivoire (PDCI).

== Ivorian Civil War ==
Soro led the Patriotic Movement of Côte d'Ivoire (MPCI) in a September 2002 rebellion against President Laurent Gbagbo that triggered the Ivorian Civil War. In December 2002 Soro's MPCI combined with two other rebel groups, the Ivorian Popular Movement of the Great West (MPIGO) and the Movement for Justice and Peace (MJP), to form the New Forces (Forces Nouvelles de Côte d'Ivoire). He was appointed Secretary-General of the New Forces. In July 2023, an investigating judge in Paris, France was appointed to investigate the April 2011 assassination of Ibrahima Coulibaly, a former Ivorian rebel leader, in which Guillaume Soro is believed to have been implicated in the assassination..

== Political career ==
Following a peace agreement in January 2003, Soro was appointed to the government as Minister of Communications. The New Forces ministers began a boycott of cabinet meetings in September 2003, returning in January 2004. After an opposition demonstration held in Abidjan in March 2004 was violently broken up, President Gbagbo dismissed Soro and two other ministers from their positions. Soro denounced the dismissals, saying they were effectively a coup by Gbagbo against the peace agreement. On 9 August 2004 Soro was reinstated.

On 28 December 2005, Soro was appointed Minister of Reconstruction and Reintegration by Prime Minister Charles Konan Banny. He attended his first cabinet meeting in this capacity on 15 March 2006.

== Prime minister ==
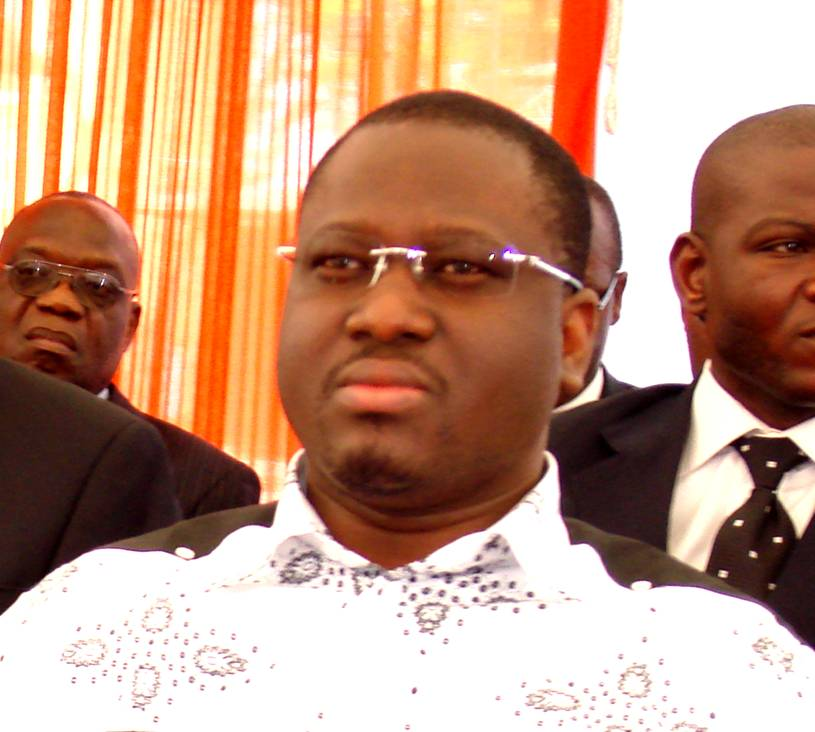

Following a peace deal signed on 4 March 2007, Soro was considered a possible candidate for Prime Minister and received Gbagbo's endorsement. In an interview published on 26 March, Soro said that he would be willing to assume the position. Gbagbo officially appointed him on 29 March, Soro took office on 4 April, and his 32 ministers were named on 7 April, many of whom served under his predecessor.

In a speech on 13 April, Soro apologized "to everybody and on behalf of everybody" for the harm caused by the rebellion. On 30 July, Soro and Gbagbo participated in a "peace flame" disarmament ceremony, which involved the burning of weapons to symbolize the end of the conflict.

The peace agreement barred Soro from standing in the 2010 presidential election, and he told Jeune Afrique in a March 2008 interview that he would discuss his political future after the election. It was rumored that Soro and Gbagbo made a secret agreement whereby Soro would support Gbagbo in the election and, in exchange, Gbagbo would back Soro in the subsequent presidential election. Soro dismissed this as "gossip," describing himself as an "arbiter of the electoral process," and further said the New Forces would not back any candidate and that its members could vote for whomever they wished.

When the Gbagbo-allied Constitutional Council announced their results of the 2010 poll and Gbagbo was sworn in, Soro resigned as prime minister, supporting opposition candidate Alassane Ouattara. Ouattara had been declared the winner by the electoral commission, and he reappointed Soro after taking the oath of office at a rival ceremony.

Soro was elected to the National Assembly in the December 2011 parliamentary election. After serving as Ouattara's prime minister for over a year, Soro resigned on 8 March 2012. He was then elected as President of the National Assembly on 12 March 2012, a move that ensured that he would remain a key figure on the political scene. There were no other candidates for the post.

In 2016 Burkina Faso issued an international arrest warrant for Soro for his alleged role in the 2015 Burkinabé coup d'état.

Standing as the candidate of the ruling coalition, the Rally of Houphouëtists for Democracy and Peace, in the city of Ferkessédougou, Soro was re-elected to the National Assembly in the December 2016 parliamentary election with 98.7% of the vote. When the National Assembly began meeting for the new parliamentary term, Soro was re-elected as President of the National Assembly on 9 January 2017. He received 230 votes from the 252 deputies present; Evariste Méambly, an independent deputy, received 12 votes, and there were 10 spoilt votes.

== Assassination attempt ==
On 29 June 2007, a Fokker 100 carrying Prime Minister Soro, members of his delegation, and 20 journalists was taxiing on a runway at an airport in Bouaké when it was targeted by rocket and Kalashnikov fire. One rocket struck and exploded in the cabin, one missed, and a third bounced off the fuselage and did not detonate. Soro wasn't injured, but four people were killed and ten others wounded. Those who died were Security Chief Drissa Ouattara, the Prime Minister's bodyguard Siaka Diomandé, and Protocole d’Etat members Sékou Doumbia and Souleymane Sérifou. Arrests were subsequently reported.

== 2020 Ivorian presidential election ==
Soro stated that he intended to compete in the Ivorian presidential election on 31 October 2020.

On April 29, 2020, Soro was sentenced in absentia to 20 years in prison on charges of embezzling public funds and money laundering.

Party political offices
New political party	Leader of the Patriotic Movement; 2005–present	Incumbent
Political offices
Preceded by Charles Konan Banny	Prime Minister of the Ivory Coast; 2007–2012	Succeeded by Jeannot Ahoussou-Kouadio
Preceded by Amani N'Guessan	Minister of Defence; 2011–2012	Succeeded by Alassane Ouattara
