= Sylvain Komenan N'Guessan =

Ivorian footballer

Sylvain Komenan
Personal information
- Full name: Sylvain Komenan N'Guessan
- Date of birth: 1 February 1983 (age 43)
- Place of birth: Tiassalé, Ivory Coast
- Height: 1.80 m (5 ft 11 in)
- Position: Striker

Team information
- Current team: Grande Synthe

Youth career
- Oryx Yopougon
- J.F.C.C. Cocody
- Stade Abidjan
- Châteauroux FC

Senior career*
Years	Team	Apps	(Gls)
2003–2004	Châteauroux	4	(1)
2004–2005	SO Romorantin	15	(1)
2005–2006	ESA Brive	34	(9)
2006–2007	Moulins	33	(16)
2007–2009	Montluçon	63	(20)
2009–2010	Carquefou	27	(9)
2010	Gazélec Ajaccio	10	(4)
2011–	Grande Synthe	7	(4)
- * Club domestic league appearances and goals

Sylvain Komenan N'Guessan (born 1 February 1983) is an Ivorian professional footballer, who plays in the Championnat de France amateur 2 as a striker for Olympique Grande-Synthe.

== Career ==
Komenan was born in Tiassalé. He played on the professional level in Ligue 2 for Châteauroux.

== Personal life ==
He also holds French citizenship.
