= Pierre Djibril Coulibaly =

Ivorian software engineer

Pierre Djibril Coulibaly (born June 1957, Korhogo, Ivory Coast) is an Ivorian software engineer. He is managing director of Computer NEXAT, which he created in 2003 after twenty years at SIR and as a head of IT in education.

== Career ==
Coulibaly was a founding member and vice president of the Federation of Inventors of the Ivory Coast (FEDINCI). Coulibaly introduced, in 2010, an application to Organisation Africaine de la Propriété Intellectuelle (Organisation of African Intellectual Property) to obtain a patent for the universal computer management software design process (patent 15165 of 30 March 2010). The work of Coulibaly on universal management software facilitates accessibility of management software for business areas hitherto neglected by application developers.

== Awards ==
Coulibaly won the Start Award for Quality in Geneva, Switzerland; and the Knight of the National Order of Côte d'Ivoire for best tertiary sector innovation in Cotonou, Benin in 2013 at the Carrefour international innovation convention.

Coulibaly was honored as one of the 100 personalities that have marked Africa in 2014, by the FinancialAfrik.
