= Jean-Louis Billon =

Ivorian politician (born 1964)

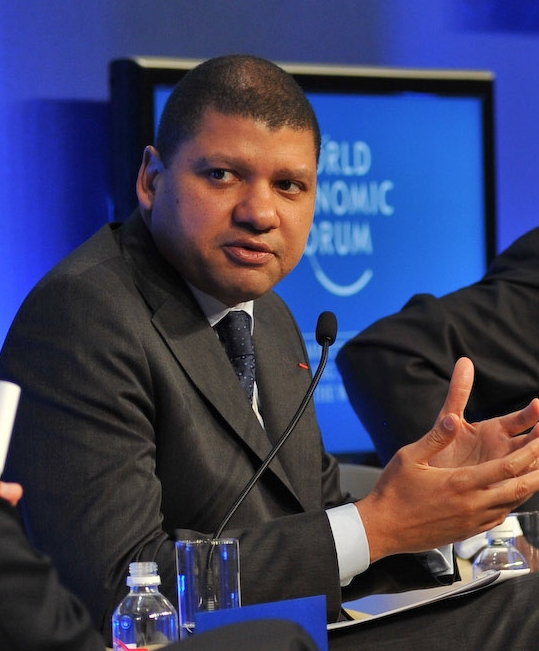
- Billon in 2011

Minister of Commerce
- In office 13 January 2016 – 10 January 2017
- President: Alassane Ouattara
- Prime Minister: Daniel Kablan Duncan
- Preceded by: Himself
- Succeeded by: Souleymane Diarrassouba

Minister of Trade, Crafts and SME
- In office 22 November 2012 – 13 January 2016
- President: Alassane Ouattara
- Prime Minister: Daniel Kablan Duncan
- Preceded by: Sidiki Konaté
- Succeeded by: Himself

Personal details
- Born: 8 December 1964 (age 61) Bouaké, Côte d'Ivoire
- Party: PDCI-RDA
- Spouse: Henriette Gomis
- Education: Master in Business Law at the University of Montpellier
- Profession: Former SIFCA CEO; Former President of the Chamber of Commerce and Industry of Ivory Coast

Jean-Louis Billon (born 8 December 1964) is an Ivorian politician and businessman who served as Minister of Commerce from 2012 to 2017. He has been married to Henriette Gomis since 1994. He is a supporter of free markets.

== Early life and education ==
Billon spent his childhood between Abidjan and Dabakala, the birthplace of his father (Pierre Billon). He obtained a Master in Business Law at the University of Montpellier and a degree from the Institute of Higher National Defence Studies.

Jean-Louis Billon is also the founder of the Jean-Louis Billon Foundation, which focuses on education and healthcare initiatives in Côte d'Ivoire.

He got his masters in International Business Management at the University of Florida. He began his career in Wisconsin, as sales manager of Grace Cocoa.

In 2001, he took the head of the family business and became mayor of Dabakala, a position he held until his appointment to the chair of the Regional Council of Hambol in 2013.

== Economic involvement ==
Jean-Louis Billon was named socioeconomic adviser in 2001, Vice-President of the WAEMU Regional Chamber in 2002 and Vice President for West Africa of the Permanent Conference of African and Francophone Consular Chambers in 2004.

That same year, he participated with some members of the Ivorian civil society (CSCI) to the development of scenarios, in order to help the country to emerge from the crisis. Indeed, he launched a campaign across Europe and emerging countries, for example with a meeting at the MEDEF in Paris on 26 May 2008, where he was asking for the return of French investors in Ivory Coast.

In 2009, he became Chairman of the Board of Directors of UBA Bank.

== Political career ==
Appointed Minister of Trade, Crafts and SME on 22 November 2012, by President Alassane Ouattara, Jean-Louis Billon is currently Minister of Trade of Ivory Coast.

During his first term, he has defined an institutional and regulatory framework for the activities of crafts and SMEs, to improve their creation and development. On this purpose, he is the creator of the Phoenix Project, in an ongoing wish to enhance African companies.

Various other actions took place during Jean-Louis Billon’s term. Among them, the rehabilitation of Artisanal Centre of Grand-Bassam, the creation of the first Ivorian Market Handicrafts (MIVA), or the launch of the project "The Agency" for SMEs, including the establishment of a guarantee fund and business incubators.

In October 2021, Jean-Louis Billon announced his candidacy for the presidential election scheduled for 2025. On October 26, 2024, he reaffirmed his candidacy for the presidential election.

In January 2025, the disciplinary council of the Democratic Party of Côte d'Ivoire (PDCI) summoned him on January 15, 2025, following a request from Tidjane Thiam, but this was ultimately canceled.

== Sports ==
On 13 December 2007, he became head of the National Committee of Support for Elephants, which he resigned 27 June 2010 after the World campaign in South Africa.
