= 2011 Ivorian parliamentary election =

- 11 December 2011
- All 255 seats in the National Assembly
Party	Leader	Vote %	Seats	+/–
RDR	Alassane Ouattara	42.00	125	+120
PDCI–RDA	Henri Konan Bédié	28.97	77	−17
UDPCI	Albert Toikeusse Mabri	3.17	8	New
RHDP	Alassane Ouattara	1.64	4	New
MFA	Innocent Anaky Kobena	0.76	3	+2
UPCI	Mel Eg Théodore	0.50	1	New
Independents	–	21.03	35	+13
This lists parties that won seats. See the complete results below.
Prime Minister before	Prime Minister after
Guillaume Soro; Independent	Jeannot Ahoussou-Kouadio; PDCI–RDA

Parliamentary elections were held in Ivory Coast on 11 December 2011, after the presidential elections in late 2010. They followed a peace agreement between the government and the New Forces (former rebels) that was signed in March 2007. The Rally of the Republicans, the party of President Alassane Ouattara, won just under half the seats in the National Assembly.

== Background ==
Following the agreement, the election was planned to be held in the first quarter of 2008. On 6 August 2007, then-president Laurent Gbagbo said it would be possible, with goodwill and determination, to hold the election as early as December 2007. This was greeted with widespread skepticism by observers and the opposition, who said that the preparations for elections would be incomplete at such an early stage. It was announced on 12 September that the process of voter identification and registration would begin on 25 September, and if it went well it was expected to be completed by the end of 2007. On 13 September the President of the Independent Electoral Commission (CEI), Robert Mambe, said that the presidential election should be held, "at the latest", ten months after the end of the identification process, around October 2008, and that the parliamentary election should be held 45 days after the presidential election. On 18 September Gbagbo again expressed his desire to see the elections held quickly and said that he was opposed to the "remote dates" being suggested.

The public hearings of the identification process were intended for about three million people born in Ivory Coast who did not yet have identification papers. The hearings were launched on 25 September and were to be held first in Ouragahio and Ferkessédougou, respectively the home regions of Gbagbo and Prime Minister Guillaume Soro. The French company Sagem was designated as the technical operator of the electoral register in November 2007.

On 27 November Gbagbo and Soro reached an agreement in Ouagadougou, Burkina Faso, that the election would be held by the end of June 2008; the electoral commission was to propose the specific date of the election. Gbagbo reiterated on December 19 that the election would be held no later than the end of June 2008, and he said that he would visit all the regions held by the New Forces by March 2008 and would then make a report to the Constitutional Council, which would in turn approve the holding of the election.

French Minister of Foreign Affairs Bernard Kouchner said on 27 January 2008 that the election might be delayed slightly past the end of June deadline due to technical requirements, particularly the need to update voter lists.

While Ouattara and Bédié said that full implementation of the peace agreement, including total disarmament of the New Forces, was not necessary prior to the holding of the election, Pascal Affi N'Guessan, the President of the Ivorian Popular Front (FPI), Gbagbo's party, said that disarmament must be completed before the election.

By March 2008, the common view among observers was that it would be impossible to hold the election as early as June. Although no leading political figures had yet expressed that view, in March Gbagbo referred to the importance of considering actual conditions and said that it would not mean "death" if the election was not held in June.

On 14 April Government Spokesman Amadou Koné announced that the presidential election would be held on 30 November, thus delaying it by five months. According to Koné, the date was chosen by the CEI, which had presented a report to the government. Koné said that the parliamentary election would be held on a different date. Gbagbo expressed enthusiasm on the occasion, describing it as "a great day for Côte d'Ivoire". According to Soro's spokesman Sindou Méité, a "broad consensus" had been reached by Soro and other leading political figures regarding the date. The PDCI and RDR welcomed the announcement of a date, although they remained cautious; the United Nations Operation in Ivory Coast also welcomed it. On the same day, Gbagbo signed a decree outlining the terms of cooperation between the National Institute of Statistics and the French company Sagem, the latter of which is tasked with surveying the population so that voter lists can be updated and new voter cards can be created.

== Campaign ==
The Ivorian Popular Front boycotted the election, accusing the electoral commission of bias in favour of Alassane Ouattara and accusing the army of intimidating FPI supporters during the campaign. The party also complained of having been limited in informing the electorate, with the pro-FPI newspaper Notre Voie having been banned by the government and many of its journalists arrested or jailed.

Gbagbo supporters defying the boycott participated in the election with the coalition National Congress for the Resistance of Democracy. Ouattara's supporters formed the coalition Rally of Houphouëtists for Democracy and Peace.

== Results ==
Following court challenges to the election of 66 of the MPs, 11 results were declared invalid (five of those were won by the RDR, four by independents, one by the UDPCI). Reruns were held on 26 February 2012.

Party	Votes	%	Seats
Rally of the Republicans	819,086	42.00	125
Democratic Party of Ivory Coast – African Democratic Rally	564,958	28.97	77
Union for Democracy and Peace in Ivory Coast	61,898	3.17	8
Rally of Houphouëtists for Democracy and Peace	32,041	1.64	4
Ivorian Workers' Party	17,889	0.92	0
Movement of the Forces of the Future	14,750	0.76	3
Union for Ivory Coast	9,757	0.50	1
Liberty and Democracy for the Republic	3,624	0.19	0
UDPCI–MFA–PIT	2,453	0.13	0
United Cape for Democracy and Development	1,551	0.08	0
UDPCI–RDR	1,514	0.08	0
Ivorian Ecological Movement	1,511	0.08	0
Democratic and Civic Union	1,505	0.08	0
Community Revolution Party	890	0.05	0
Union for Total Democracy in Ivory Coast	866	0.04	0
Democratic and Social Movement	766	0.04	0
Ivorian Movement for Renewal and Hope	693	0.04	0
Ivorian Party of Farmers	530	0.03	0
Union of Peasants, Workers and Employees	499	0.03	0
Party for Progress and Socialism	468	0.02	0
Union of Democrats for Progress	397	0.02	0
National Civic Movement	368	0.02	0
Ivorian Conglomerat for the Renewal of Moderates	362	0.02	0
National Union for Democracy	314	0.02	0
National Democratic Party	267	0.01	0
Republican Party	246	0.01	0
Union for National Progress	151	0.01	0
National Party of Young Democrats	143	0.01	0
La Renaissance	123	0.01	0
Party of Republican Democrats	78	0.00	0
Pan-African Democratic Rally	76	0.00	0
Federation of Families	74	0.00	0
Union of Liberals	57	0.00	0
Ivorian Party of Rising to Challenges	43	0.00	0
People's Socialist Union	39	0.00	0
Group for Democracy and Progress	36	0.00	0
Independents	410,057	21.03	35
Invalidated/not declared			2
Total	1,950,080	100.00	255
Valid votes	1,958,332	94.57	
Invalid/blank votes	112,461	5.43	
Total votes	2,070,793	100.00	
Registered voters/turnout	5,664,377	36.56	
Source: Election Passport, CEI
