= Rally of Houphouëtists for Democracy and Peace =

Political alliance in Ivory Coast

Rally of Houphouëtists for Democracy and Peace Rassemblement des houphouëtistes pour la démocratie et la paix
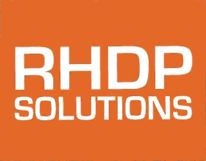
- Abbreviation: RHDP
- Leader: Alassane Ouattara
- Founded: 18 May 2005 (coalition); 16 July 2018 (party)
- Membership (2020): 1,351,243
- Ideology: Liberal conservatism
- Political position: Centre-right to right-wing
- International affiliation: Liberal International
- Colours: Orange, white, green (Ivorian tricolour)
- Seats in the National Assembly: 197 / 255
- Seats in the Senate: 56 / 99

Website
- www.rhdpofficiel.ci

The Rally of Houphouëtists for Democracy and Peace (French: Rassemblement des houphouëtistes pour la démocratie et la paix, RHDP) is a political party in Ivory Coast.

== History ==
The RHDP was established as a political alliance on 18 May 2005, seeking to reclaim the political ideology of the country's founding president, Félix Houphouët-Boigny. It initially included the Rally of the Republicans, the Democratic Party of Côte d'Ivoire, the Union for Democracy and Peace in Côte d'Ivoire, the Movement of the Forces of the Future and the Union for Ivory Coast.

Despite the formation of the alliance, each party put forward its own candidate in the 2010 presidential elections. Although the five parties also largely contested the 2011 parliamentary elections alone, joint RHDP lists were put forward in some constituencies, winning four seats in Abidjan. In the 2015 presidential election the alliance nominated incumbent President Alassane Ouattara of the Rally for the Republic as its candidate. Ouattara won with 84% of the vote. In 2016 the Ivorian Workers' Party joined the RHDP to jointly contest the 2016 parliamentary elections. The alliance retained its majority in the elections, winning 167 of the 255 seats.

On 16 July 2018 the alliance was transformed into a unitary party, including members of the Rally of the Republicans, the Union for Democracy and Peace in Ivory Coast and some minor parties. The new party designated Alassane Ouattara as its candidate for the 2020 presidential elections.

On 27 May 2024 the RHDP nominated Ouattara as its candidate for the 2025 presidential elections.

== Election results ==
=== President ===
Election	Candidate	First round		Second round		Result
Election	Candidate	Votes	%	Votes	%	Result
2015	Alassane Ouattara	2,618,229	83.66%	-	-	Elected ✓
2020	Alassane Ouattara	3,031,483	95.31%	-	-	Elected ✓
2025	Alassane Ouattara	3,759,030	91.23%	-	-	Elected ✓

=== National Assembly ===
Election	Votes	%	Seats	+/–	Position	Government
2011	32,041	1.64%	4 / 255		4th	Government
2016	1,019,057	50.26%	167 / 255	▲163	▲1st	Majority government
2021	1,313,886	49.18%	137 / 255	▼30	1st	Majority government
2025	1,825,244	61.95%	196 / 255	▲59	1st	Majority government
