= National Assembly (Ivory Coast) =

Legislature of Ivory Coast

Coordinates: 5°19′44″N 4°1′13″W

National Assembly Assemblée nationale
- Parliament of Ivory Coast

Type
- Type: Lower house Unicameral (1960–2016)

Leadership
- President: Patrick Achi, RHDP since 17 January 2026

Structure
- Seats: 255
- Political groups: Government (196): Rally of Houphouëtists for Democracy and Peace (196); Opposition (29): Democratic Party of Ivory Coast (32); Ivorian Popular Front (1); Union for the Republic (1); Le Buffle (1); Non-partisan (24): Independents (24)

Elections
- Voting system: First past the post
- Last election: 27 December 2025

Meeting place
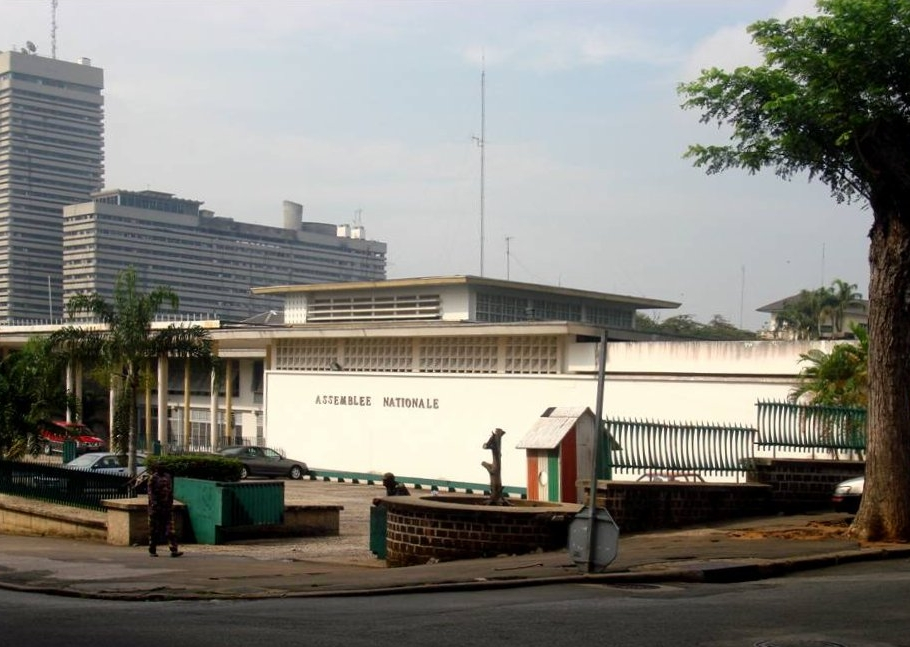
- Le Plateau, Abidjan

Website
- www.assnat.ci/assembleenationale/

The National Assembly is the lower house of the Parliament of Ivory Coast since November 2016. From 1960 to 2016, the National Assembly was Ivory Coast's unicameral legislative body. Evolved from semi-representative bodies of the French Colonial period, the first National Assembly was constituted on 27 November 1960 with 70 elected members (députés) in accordance with the Constitution of 31 October 1960, which created the First Republic.

Legislative power in Ivory Coast is exercised by Deputies elected from Constituencies (Circonscriptions) by a Scrutin de Liste or Plurality-at-large voting which has neither a proportional representation or panachage element common in many such systems. The powers of this Assembly expire at the end of its second regular session (session ordinaire) in the fifth year of its mandate. The Assembly is then reformed by election from candidates who must be Ivorian citizens of 25 years or older who have never renounced their Ivorian nationality.

The first National Assembly of the Second Republic of Ivory Coast elected for the period 2000–2005 was marked by both internal political crisis and the Ivorian Civil War. No elections were held in 2005, but with the peace deal ending the Civil War, elections are expected on 30 November 2008.

The 2011 Ivorian parliamentary election was dominated by the Rally of the Republicans, the party of President Alassane Ouattara, followed by the Democratic Party of Côte d'Ivoire – African Democratic Rally. The current National Assembly is made up of 255 elected officials, with the National Assembly president post being vacant.

== Presidents of the National Assembly ==
Presidents of the Conseil général
No.	Name	Entered office	Left office
1	Auguste Denise	1947	1950

Presidents of the Territorial Assembly
No.	Name	Entered office	Left office
1	Victor Capai Djédjé	1950	1953
2	Félix Houphouët-Boigny	1953	1959

Presidents of the National Assembly
No.	Name	Entered office	Left office
1	Philippe Yacé	27 April 1959	1980
2	Henri Konan Bédié	December 1980	1993
3	Charles Bauza Donwahi	8 January 1993	2 April 1997
4	Émile Atta Brou	1997	1999
5	Mamadou Koulibaly	22 January 2001	12 March 2012
6	Guillaume Kigbafori Soro	12 March 2012	8 February 2019
7	Amadou Soumahoro	7 March 2019	7 May 2022
8	Adama Bictogo	7 June 2022	17 January 2026
9	Patrick Achi	17 January 2026	Incumbent

== Last election results ==
Party	Votes	%	Seats	+/–
Rally of Houphouëtists for Democracy and Peace	1,825,244	61.95	196	+57
Democratic Party of Ivory Coast	354,618	12.04	32	+9
Democratic Party of Ivory Coast/Ivorian Popular Front/Today and Tomorrow, Ivory Coast	18,757	0.64	0	New
Ivorian Popular Front	14,164	0.48	1	–1
Today and Tomorrow, Ivory Coast	11,883	0.40	0	New
Today and Tomorrow, Ivory Coast/Group of Political Partners for Peace/VALEUR	7,489	0.25	0	New
Democratic Congress	4,149	0.14	0	New
Movement of Capable Generations	3,823	0.13	0	New
Together for Democracy and Sovereignty	3,387	0.11	0	–8
Democratic Party of Ivory Coast/Together for Democracy and Sovereignty	2,719	0.09	0	–50
Union for the Republic	2,571	0.09	1	New
Act for Institutions and Development	1,550	0.05	0	New
Group of Political Partners for Peace	1,253	0.04	0	0
Union of Democrats for Progress	1,209	0.04	0	0
Le Buffle – Victory for Development	1,159	0.04	1	New
National Democratic and Reformist Front	934	0.03	0	0
National Congress for the Development of Ivory Coast	881	0.03	0	0
National Movement for Reconciliation and Peace	727	0.02	0	New
Party for African Integration/Ivorian Renaissance Party/Democratic Congress	622	0.02	0	New
Ivorian Alliance for the Republic and Democracy	566	0.02	0	New
Democratic Movement for Renewal	542	0.02	0	New
People's Party of Social Democrats	492	0.02	0	0
Network of Free Voters of Ivory Coast	334	0.01	0	0
Union of Democratic Forces	289	0.01	0	New
New Union for Ivory Coast	249	0.01	0	0
Prosperity, Happiness and Joy of Living	219	0.01	0	New
Alliance for the Republic	214	0.01	0	New
Ivorian Centrist Alliance	193	0.01	0	0
Ivorian Movement for Democratic Renewal and the Emancipation of Peoples	179	0.01	0	New
Rally for Democracy and Peace	175	0.01	0	New
Movement for the Emergence of Republicans of Ivory Coast	164	0.01	0	New
Democratic and Citizen Union	141	0.00	0	New
National Patriotic Circle for a New ivory Coast	110	0.00	0	New
National Integrity and Conscience	94	0.00	0	0
Pro Ivory Coast	70	0.00	0	New
National Youth Convergence of Bafing for ADO	68	0.00	0	New
Union for the Promotion of Ivory Coast	68	0.00	0	New
Pan-African Patriotic Front	37	0.00	0	New
Government of Justice and Peace in Ivory Coast	35	0.00	0	New
Party for African Integration/Democratic Congress	35	0.00	0	New
Movement of Leaders for a Prosperous Ivory Coast	30	0.00	0	New
Congress for the Ivorian and Pan-African Renaissance	17	0.00	0	New
Independents	655,143	22.24	24	–1
Blank votes	29,640	1.01	–	–
Total	2,946,243	100.00	255	–
Valid votes	2,946,243	97.72		
Invalid votes	68,693	2.28		
Total votes	3,014,936	100.00		
Registered voters/turnout	8,597,092	35.07		
Source: CEI (main results) CEI (re-runs)

== See also ==
- History of Ivory Coast
- Legislative Branch
- Politics of Ivory Coast
- List of national legislatures
