= Ivorian Popular Front =

Political party in Ivory Coast

Ivorian Popular Front Front populaire ivoirien
- Abbreviation: FPI
- Leader: Pascal Affi N'Guessan
- Founded: 1982
- Ideology: Social democracy Democratic socialism Left-wing nationalism
- Political position: Centre-left
- International affiliation: Socialist International
- Colours: Blue, white, red
- Seats in the National Assembly: 1 / 255

Website
- fpi-ci.com

The Ivorian Popular Front (French: Front populaire ivoirien; abbr. FPI) is a centre-left, democratic socialist and social democratic political party in Ivory Coast.

== History ==
FPI was founded in exile in 1982 by history professor Laurent Gbagbo, Aboudramane Sangaré, and other allies during the one-party rule of President Félix Houphouët-Boigny. Politically inspired by the French Socialist Party, the FPI was until 2011 a full member of the Socialist International (SI). The expulsion of the FPI from the SI occurred as a result of the 2010–2011 Ivorian crisis.

Gbagbo was sworn in as president after the heavily disputed presidential election of October 22, 2000. In the parliamentary election held on 10 December 2000 and 14 January 2001, the party won 96 out of 225 seats.

The party president is Pascal Affi N'Guessan, a former prime minister. Following Gbagbo's election as president, he was required to step down as party leader, and N'Guessan was elected to head the party at its Third Extraordinary Congress in July 2001.

The Ivorian Popular Front boycotted the 2011 parliamentary election, accusing the electoral commission of bias in favour of Alassane Ouattara and accusing the army of intimidating FPI supporters during the campaign. The party also complained of having been limited in informing the electorate, with the pro-FPI newspaper Notre Voie having been banned by the government and many of its journalists arrested or jailed.

On 8 August 2015, N'Guessan was designated as the FPI's presidential candidate for the October 2015 presidential election. He denounced the incarceration of Gbagbo by the International Criminal Court and political conditions under Ouattara: "Peace isn't only the silence of weapons. Can we say that Ivory Coast is in peace when President Gbagbo is in The Hague? With hundreds of political prisoners in jail, Ivory Coast is not in peace." Some hardliners in the FPI did not want to participate in elections as long as Gbagbo remained imprisoned, but others felt the party needed to remain engaged in the electoral process.

In the December 2016 parliamentary election, only three FPI candidates, including N'Guessan, were elected to the National Assembly.

On December 23, 2020, the FPI said it would participate in the 2021 Ivorian parliamentary election.

== Election results ==
=== Presidential elections ===
Election	Party candidate	Votes	%	Votes	%	Results
Election	Party candidate	First Round		Second Round		Results
1990	Laurent Gbagbo	548,441	18.32%	-	-	Lost ✗
1995	Boycotted					
2000	Laurent Gbagbo	1,065,597	59.4%	-	-	Elected ✓
2010	Laurent Gbagbo	1,756,504	38.04%	2,054,537 (CC)	51.45% (CC)	Elected ✓
2010	Laurent Gbagbo	1,756,504	38.04%	2,107,055 (IEC)	45.9% (IEC)	Elected ✓
2015	Pascal Affi N'Guessan	290,780	9.29%	-	-	Lost ✗

=== National Assembly elections ===
Election	Party leader	Votes	%	Seats	+/–
1990	Laurent Gbagbo	365,999	19.8%	9 / 175	▲9
1995	Laurent Gbagbo			12 / 175	▲3
2000–01	Laurent Gbagbo			96 / 225	▲84
2011	Pascal Affi N'Guessan	Boycotted		0 / 255	▼96
2016	Pascal Affi N'Guessan	118,130	5.83%	3 / 255	▲3
2021	Pascal Affi N'Guessan	52,343	1.93%	2 / 255	▼1
2025	Pascal Affi N'Guessan	14,164	0.48%	1 / 255	▼1
