= 2022 in Ivory Coast =

- Decades: 2000s; 2010s; 2020s
- See also: Other events of 2022; Timeline of Ivorian history

Events in the year 2022 in Ivory Coast.

== Incumbents ==
- President: Alassane Ouattara
- Prime Minister Patrick Achi (Interim, starting March 8)

== Events ==
Ongoing: COVID-19 pandemic in Ivory Coast

- April 6 – Former President of Burkina Faso Blaise Compaoré is found guilty of complicity in the murder of the country's first president, Thomas Sankara, and is sentenced in absentia to life imprisonment. Compaoré has been in exile in Ivory Coast ever since resigning to the presidency following the 2014 Burkina Faso uprising.
- April 13 – Prime Minister Patrick Achi resigns due to President Outtara's plans to reshuffle the government.
- April 19 – Patrick Achi is reappointed prime minister with a cabinet reshuffle and the formation of a second government replacing his original cabinet.
- December 28 – A court in Abidjan, Ivory Coast, sentences four Malian men to life imprisonment for inciting shootings that killed 19 people and injured 30 others at a beach resort in Grand-Bassam in 2016.

== Deaths ==
- January 3 – Oussou Konan Anicet, 32, footballer (Makkasa, HJK, Nam Dinh), poisoned.
- January 13 – Lambert Amon Tanoh, 95, politician, minister of education (1963–1970), COVID-19.
- January 30 – Alphonse Douati, 67, politician.
- February 6 – Abraham Sie, 22, basketball player (ABC Fighters, DUC Dakar, national team).
- February 7 – Amadou Soumahoro, 68, politician, president of the National Assembly (since 2019).
- April 6 – Abraham Sie, 22, basketball player (ABC Fighters, DUC Dakar, national team).
- May 7 – Amadou Soumahoro, 68, politician, president of the National Assembly (since 2019).
- September 29 – Akissi Kouamé, 67, army officer
- October 30 – Martine Djibo, educator and politician, MP
- November 1 – Charles Nokan, 85, academic and writer.
- December 19 – Max Brito, 51, rugby union player (national team).
- December 25 – Luc Marius Ibriga, 66, Ivorian-born Burkinabé academic and jurist.

== See also ==
- COVID-19 pandemic in Africa
- African Continental Free Trade Area
- Organisation internationale de la Francophonie
