= 2026 in Ivory Coast =

- Decades: 2000s; 2010s; 2020s
- See also: Other events of 2026; Timeline of Ivorian history

Events in the year 2026 in Ivory Coast.

== Incumbents ==
- President: Alassane Ouattara
- Prime Minister Robert Beugré Mambé

== Events ==
=== January ===
- 7 January – The incumbent cabinet resigns.
- 21 January – President Ouattara reappoints Robert Beugré Mambé as prime minister.
- 23 January – President Ouattara appoints Defence Minister Téné Birahima Ouattara as vice prime minister, while retaining his defence portfolio.

=== March ===
- 13 March – France returns a talking drum looted in 1916 at a ceremony in Abidjan, the first time it has repatriated a cultural artefact to Ivory Coast.

=== May ===
- 1 May – China lifts tariffs on imports from Ivory Coast until 2028.
- 6 May – The government dissolves the Independent Electoral Commission (CEI) following criticism from opposition parties and civil society groups over its independence and handling of elections.

=== June ===
- 25 June – The Ivory Coast reaches the knockout stage of the FIFA World Cup for the first time in its team history, defeating Curaçao 2-0 in Group E during the 2026 FIFA World Cup.
- 30 June – At least 59 people are killed in floods and landslides caused by torrential rain in Abidjan and Ghana.

=== July ===
- 13 July – A bus plunges into the Bafing River, killing 24 people and injuring 36 others.

== Holidays ==
- 1 January – New Year's Day
- 27 March – Day after Laylat al-Qadr
- 30 March – Korité
- 21 April – Easter Monday
- 1 May – Labour Day
- 29 May – Ascension Day
- 6 June – Tabaski
- 9 June – Whit Monday
- 7 August – Independence Day
- 15 August – Assumption Day
- 5 September – Day after the Prophet's Birthday
- 1 November – All Saints' Day
- 15 November – National Peace Day
- 25 December – Christmas Day

== Deaths ==
- 7 February – Léopoldine Tiézan Coffie, 75, politician
- 18 May – Abomé l'Éléphant, 33, singer and rapper
- 21 May – DJ Congélateur, 33, singer and artist
- 9 August – Martin Fofié Kouakou, military official and former Forces Nouvelles zone commander.
- 15 September – René Aphing Kouassi, 78, Minister of Defence (2005–2006), president of the Supreme Court (2015–2020).
- 19 October – Ediémou Blin Jacob, 80, head of the Celestial Church of Christ in Ivory Coast
