= 2021 in Ivory Coast =

- Decades: 2000s; 2010s; 2020s
- See also: Other events of 2021; Timeline of Ivorian history

Events in the year 2021 in Ivory Coast.

== Incumbents ==
- President: Alassane Ouattara
- Prime Minister
  - Hamed Bakayoko (2020-2021) Died March 10
  - Patrick Achi (Interim, starting March 8)

== Events ==
Ongoing: COVID-19 pandemic in Ivory Coast

- January 11 – Former minister Abdallah Mabri Toikeusse resurfaces following a two-month hiatus.
- January 13 – Three U.N. peacekeepers from the Ivory Coast are killed by an improvised explosive device (IED) on the road between Douentza and Timbuktu, Mali. Six others soldiers were wounded.
- February 12 – France opens a center in Abidjan that will train more than 10,000 teachers from 15 French-speaking countries in five years.
- February 26 – Ivory Coast receives 504,000 doses of COVID-19 vaccine under the COVAX vaccine-sharing plan. Ivory Coast has recorded around 35,650 COVID-19 cases and 188 deaths.
- March 6 – More than 1,500 candidates peacefully contest 255-seats in the 2021 Ivorian parliamentary election.
- March 8 – Patrick Achi is named interim Prime Minister.
- March 9 – Rally of Houphouëtists for Democracy and Peace (RHDP) wins 137 of 254 contested seats in the parliamentary election. Union for Democracy and Peace in Ivory Coast (UDPCI) claims fraud and the Ivorian Popular Front (FPI) appeals for calm until official results are in. Turnout was 37.88%.
- March 10 – Prime Minister Hamed Bakayoko dies in Germany.
- March 26 – Patrick Achi is officially named Prime Minister.
- March 31 – The International Criminal Court (ICC) upheld the acquittal of former president Laurent Gbagbo on charges of crimes against humanity.
- June 17 – Former president Gbagbo returns to Ivory Coast.

== Deaths ==
- 27 January – Guy-Alain Gauze, 68, former minister and ambassador.
- 5 February – Laurent Dona Fologo, 81, politician; COVID-19.
- 23 February – Willy Braciano, 21, footballer (Ivory Coast national football team); liver cancer.
- 10 March – Hamed Bakayoko, 56, Prime Minister (2020-2021); cancer.
- 17 May – Bruno Kouamé, 93, bishop emeritus of Abengourou.
- 19 May – Zakpa Komenan, 76, former sports and education minister.
- 19 May – Charles Gomis, 80, former diplomat and foreign minister.
- 3 July – Franck Abd-Bakar Fanny, 51, photographer.
- 9 September – Albert Kakou Tiapani, 86, politician.
- 10 September – Charles Konan Banny, 78, former prime minister; COVID-19.

== See also ==
- COVID-19 pandemic in Africa
- African Continental Free Trade Area
- Organisation internationale de la Francophonie
- 2021 in West Africa
