= Aux chemins de Babo Naki =

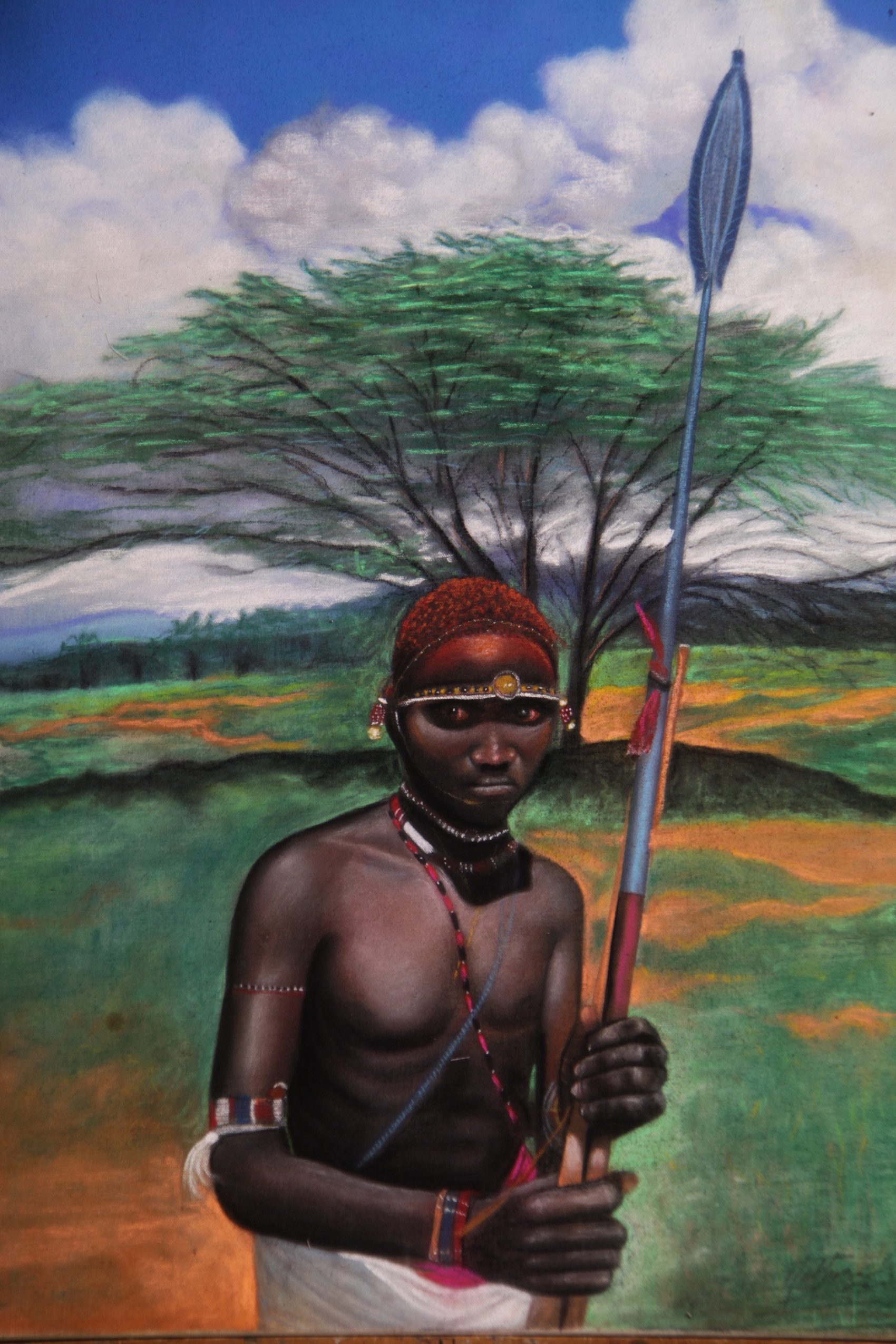
- Paint of an African hunter
- Author: Josué Guébo
- Original title: Aux chemins de Babo Naki
- Language: French
- Series: African poetry book
- Genre: Poetry
- Publisher: L’Harmattan
- Publication date: 1 October 2016
- Publication place: Ivory Coast
- Pages: 115
- ISBN: 978-2-343-10038-8
- Preceded by: My country, tonight
- Followed by: Think of Lampedusa

Aux chemins de Babo Naki is a collection of poetry by Josué Guébo, prefaced by Séry Bailly. Published in 2016, the book receives the following year, the Bernard Dadié national grand prize for literature;.

== Theme ==
The main theme of Aux chemins de Babo Naki is based on the strength of the union and solidarity, the need for social cohesion and peace.

== Summary ==
Aux chemins de Babo Naki, based on a krou myth, tells the story of Babo Naki, a hunter whose death in the bush brings his seven sons, each bearing a specific talent, to pool their skills and expertise: Guibrénipi the geographer, Guenakô the osteologist, Blakou the dermatologist, Pamadrou the hematologist, Pamagnomou the pulmonologist, Diwéri the master of speech and Vouka the physiotherapist.

They succeed in bringing their father back to life. However, when the moment comes to determine which of them has played the most decisive role in the résurrection of the father, the situation degenerates into an argument.

== Style ==
This collection of poetry, a midway between the story, the myth and the allegory is presented through some frequencies of the suggestion. The text reveals a writing with intense and varied colors.

== Literary Award ==
- Bernard Dadié national grand prize for literature, 2017.

== Edition ==
- Aux chemins de Babo Naki, Harmattan, 2016, ISBN 978-2-343-10038-8
