= Public holidays in Ivory Coast =

This is a list of public holidays in Ivory Coast.

== Public holidays ==
Date	English	Description
January 1	New Year's Day	
Monday after Easter	Easter Monday	
May 1	Labour Day	
Forty days after Easter	Ascension Day	Ascension of Jesus into Heaven
Monday after Pentecost	Whit Monday	
August 7	Independence Day	From France, 1960
August 15	Assumption Day	Feast of the Assumption of the Virgin Mary into Heaven
November 1	All Saints Day	
November 15	National Peace Day	Established in 1996.
December 25	Christmas Day	Birth of Jesus
12 Rabi' al-awwal	Day after the Prophet's Birthday	Birthday of Muhammad
27 Ramadan	Day after Lailatou-Kadr	Revelation of the Qur'an
1 Shawwal	Korité	Breaking of the Ramadan fast
10 Dhu al-Hijjah	Tabaski	Feast of the Sacrifice of Abraham

== Variable dates ==
- 2020
  - Easter Monday – April 13
  - Qadr Night (Revelation of the Quran) – May 20
  - Ascension Day – May 21
  - Korité (Breaking of the Ramadan fast) – May 24
  - Whit Monday – June 1
  - Tabaski (Feast of the Sacrifice) – starts July 31
  - Mawlid (Muhammad's birthday) – starts at sundown, October 28
- 2021
  - Easter Monday – April 5
  - Qadr Night (Revelation of the Quran) – May 9
  - Ascension Day – May 13
  - Korité (Breaking of the Ramadan fast) – May 13
  - Whit Monday – May 24
  - Tabaski (Feast of the Sacrifice) – starts July 20
  - Mawlid (Muhammad's birthday) – starts at sundown, October 18
- 2022
  - Easter Monday – April 18
  - Qadr Night (Revelation of the Quran) – April 29
  - Korité (Breaking of the Ramadan fast)– May 2
  - Whit Monday – June 6
  - Tabaski (Feast of the Sacrifice) – starts July 9
  - Mawlid (Muhammad's birthday) – starts at sundown, October 7
- 2023
  - Easter Monday – April 10
  - Qadr Night (Revelation of the Quran) – April 17
  - Korité (Breaking of the Ramadan fast)– April 21
  - Whit Monday – May 29
  - Tabaski (Feast of the Sacrifice) – starts June 28
  - Mawlid (Muhammad's birthday) – starts at sundown, September 26
- 2024
  - Easter Monday – April 1
  - Qadr Night (Revelation of the Quran) – April 6
  - Korité (Breaking of the Ramadan fast)– April 10
  - Whit Monday – May 20
  - Tabaski (Feast of the Sacrifice) – starts June 16
- 2025
  - Easter Monday – April 21
- 2026
  - Easter Monday – April 6
- 2027
  - Easter Monday – March 29
- 2028
  - Easter Monday – April 17
- 2029
  - Easter Monday – April 2
