= 2020 in Ivory Coast =

- Decades: 2000s; 2010s; 2020s
- See also: Other events of 2020; Timeline of Ivorian history

Events in the year 2020 in Ivory Coast.

== Incumbents ==
- President: Alassane Ouattara
- Prime Minister
  - Amadou Gon Coulibaly (died 8 July)
  - Hamed Bakayoko (starting 30 July)

== Events ==
=== January ===
- January – Groups are announced for the 2022 FIFA World Cup qualification in October. Cameroon and Ivory Coast will face off.
- 14 January – Authorities say they have rescued 137 children from Benin, Ghana, Niger, Nigeria, and Togo, aged 6 to 17, who were the victims of traffickers and groomed to work on cocoa plantations or in prostitution.
- 24 January – Tens of thousands are left homeless as homes in shanty town are demolished near Félix-Houphouët-Boigny International Airport.
- 31 January – Authorities in Côte d'Ivoire oppose the release of former president Laurent Gbagbo by the International Criminal Court (ICC) because his return would destabilize the country.

=== February ===
- 3 February – A three-day workshop of the "Sahel Women's Empowerment and Demographic Dividend" (SWEDD) begins in Abidjan.

=== April ===
- 28 April - Opposition politician Guillaume Soro was sentenced in absentia to 20 years in prison on charges of embezzling public funds and money laundering.
- 29 April - Ivory Coast withdrew from the African Court on Human and Peoples' Rights, after the tribunal ordered the government to suspend an arrest warrant for Guillaume Soro.

=== June ===
- 11 June – At least ten soldiers are killed and six wounded in an attack in Kafolo, near the border with Burkina Faso.

=== July ===
- July 8 – Prime Minister Amadou Gon Coulibaly, 61, dies.
- July 13 – Vice President Daniel Kablan Duncan, 77, resigns for personal reasons.

=== August ===
- August 12 - Three people were killed in Daoukro in clashes between supporters of Alassane Ouattara and Henri Konan Bedie. The government announced a ban on protests late in the day.
- August 13 - A protester in Bonoua died during clashes with security forces, where a police station was also ransacked.
- August 21 – The Independent Election commission (CEI) of the Ivory Coast rejects the candidacies of President Alassane Ouattara and former rebel leader Guillaume Soro in the October election.

=== September ===
- September 13 – 2020 Ivorian presidential election: Former president Henri Konan Bedie is nominated for president by the PDCI-RDA and former prime minister Guillaume Soro is nominated by the GPS. Both are living in exile and their eligibility is questioned. President Alassane Ouattara announced his candidacy in July, despite a Constitutional prohibition on a third term.

=== October ===
- 17 October - The home of opposition presidential candidate Pascal Affi N’Guessan was burned down in Bongouanou. Offices of the Ivorian Popular Front in Abidjan were also attacked.
- 31 October – 2020 Ivorian presidential election: President Alassane Ouattara wins a controversial third term.

=== November ===
- 13 November – Six people are killed in ethnic fighting in M'Batto.

=== December ===
- December 6 – Charles Blé Goudé, 48, the right-hand man of Laurent Gbagbo, said that he plans to return home this month after being acquitted of charges of crimes against humanity by the International Criminal Court (ICC) in The Hague.
- December 14 – President Alassane Ouattara takes the oath of office for a controversial third term, after winning more than 94% of the October 31 vote, largely boycotted by the opposition.
- December 23 – The Ivorian Popular Front (FPI) says it will participate in the 2021 Ivorian legislative election after a ten year boycott.

== Deaths ==
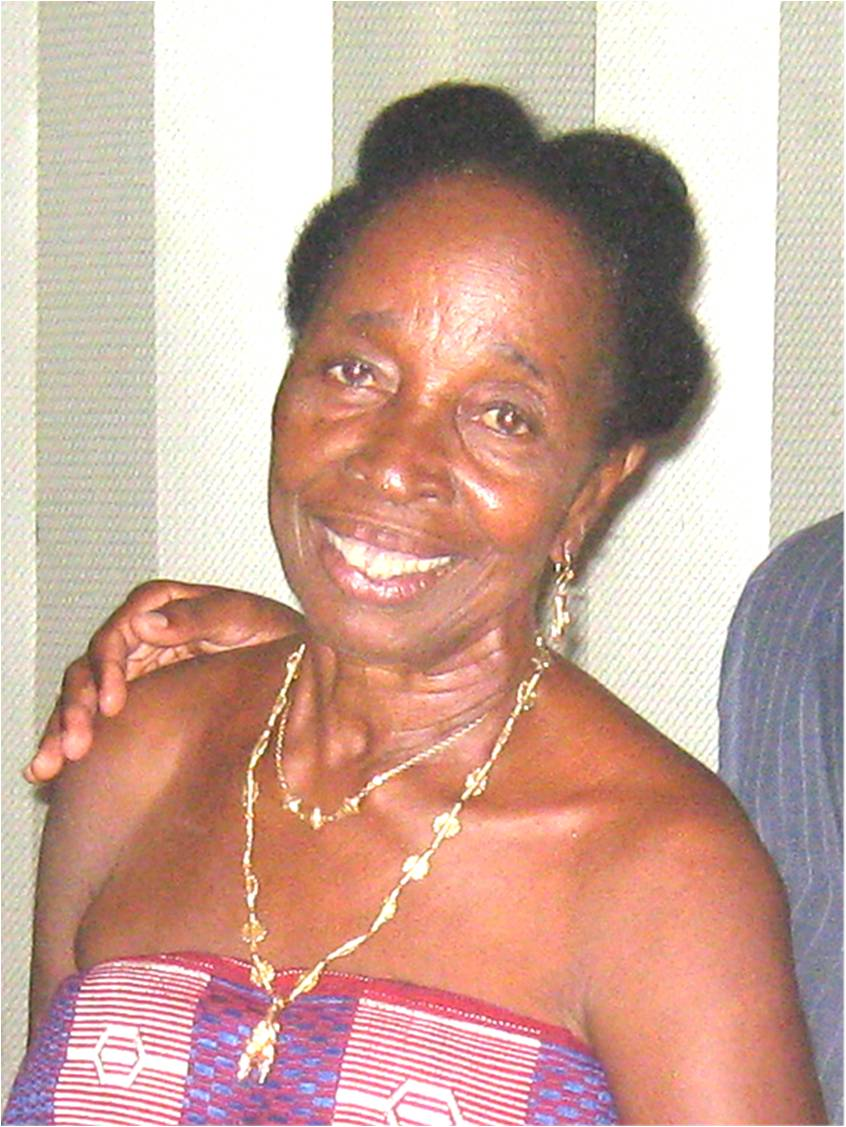
Allah Thérèse

- 5 January – Issiaka Ouattara, soldier (b. 1967)
- 19 January – Allah Thérèse, traditional singer
- 27 January – James Houra, 67, painter
- 16 February – Erickson Le Zulu, 41, disc jockey; liver cirrhosis
- 12 March – Mobio Besse Henri, boxer (b. 1977).
- 20 April – Marie Rose Guiraud, 75, dancer and choreographer
- 8 July - Amadou Gon Coulibaly, 61, prime minister (since 2017) and candidate in the 2020 presidential election.
- 17 July – Pierre-Marie Coty, 92, Roman Catholic prelate, Bishop of Daloa (1975–2005).
- 19 July – Seydou Diarra, 86, politician, Prime Minister (2000, 2003–2005).
- 25 August – Laurent Akran Mandjo, Roman Catholic prelate (b. 1940).
- 13 October – Marcel Zadi Kessy, 84, politician.

== See also ==
- COVID-19 pandemic in Africa
- COVID-19 pandemic in Ivory Coast
- 2020 in West Africa
- 2020 in Nigeria
- 2020 in Senegal
- List of George Floyd protests outside the United States
