= Zakpa =

Zakpa is both a given name and a surname. Notable people with the name include:

- Zakpa Komenan (1945–2021), Ivorian politician
- Goba Zakpa (born 1992), Ivorian footballer
