= Tanoh =

Tanoh is both a given name and a surname. Notable people with the name include:

- Tanoh Benie (born 1993), Ivorian wrestler
- Tanoh Kpassagnon (born 1994), American football player
- Augustus Obuadum Tanoh (born 1956), Ghanaian politician
- Emmanuel Gyekye Tanoh, Ghanaian politician
- Lambert Amon Tanoh (1926–2022), Ivorian politician
- Marcel Amon-Tanoh (born 1951), Ivorian politician
