= Flight 431 =

Flight 431 may refer to:

- NLM CityHopper Flight 431, crashed on 6 October 1981
- Kenya Airways Flight 431, crashed on 30 January 2000
