= 2018 in Ivory Coast =

- Decades: 1990s; 2000s; 2010s; 2020s
- See also: Other events of 2018; Timeline of Ivorian history

Events in the year 2018 in Ivory Coast.

== Incumbents ==
- President: Alassane Ouattara
- Prime Minister: Amadou Gon Coulibaly

== Events ==
- 24 March – scheduled date for the Ivorian senatorial election, 2018

== Deaths ==
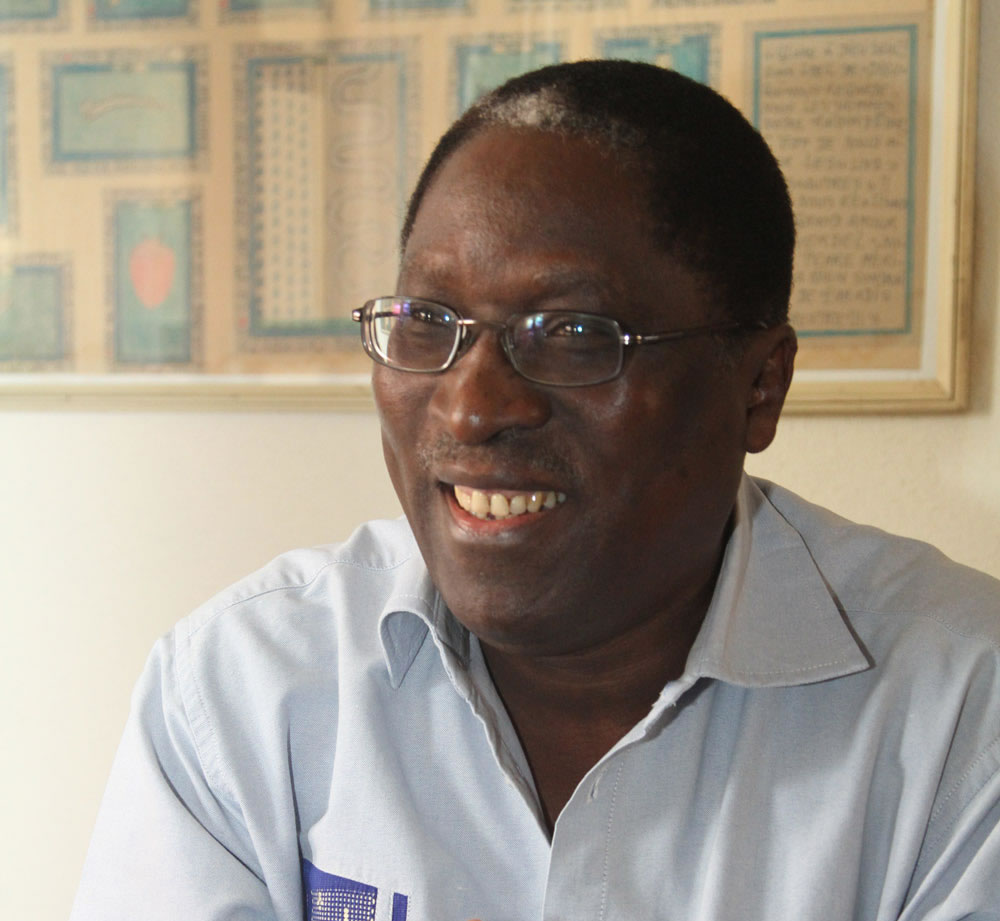
Séry Bailly

- 12 February – Jean-Jacques Béchio, politician (b. 1949).
- 27 May – Jean Konan Banny, politician (b. 1929).
- 2 December – Séry Bailly, writer and politician, Minister of Communication (b. 1948).
