= Kenya Airways Flight 431 =

2000 aviation accident in the Atlantic Ocean

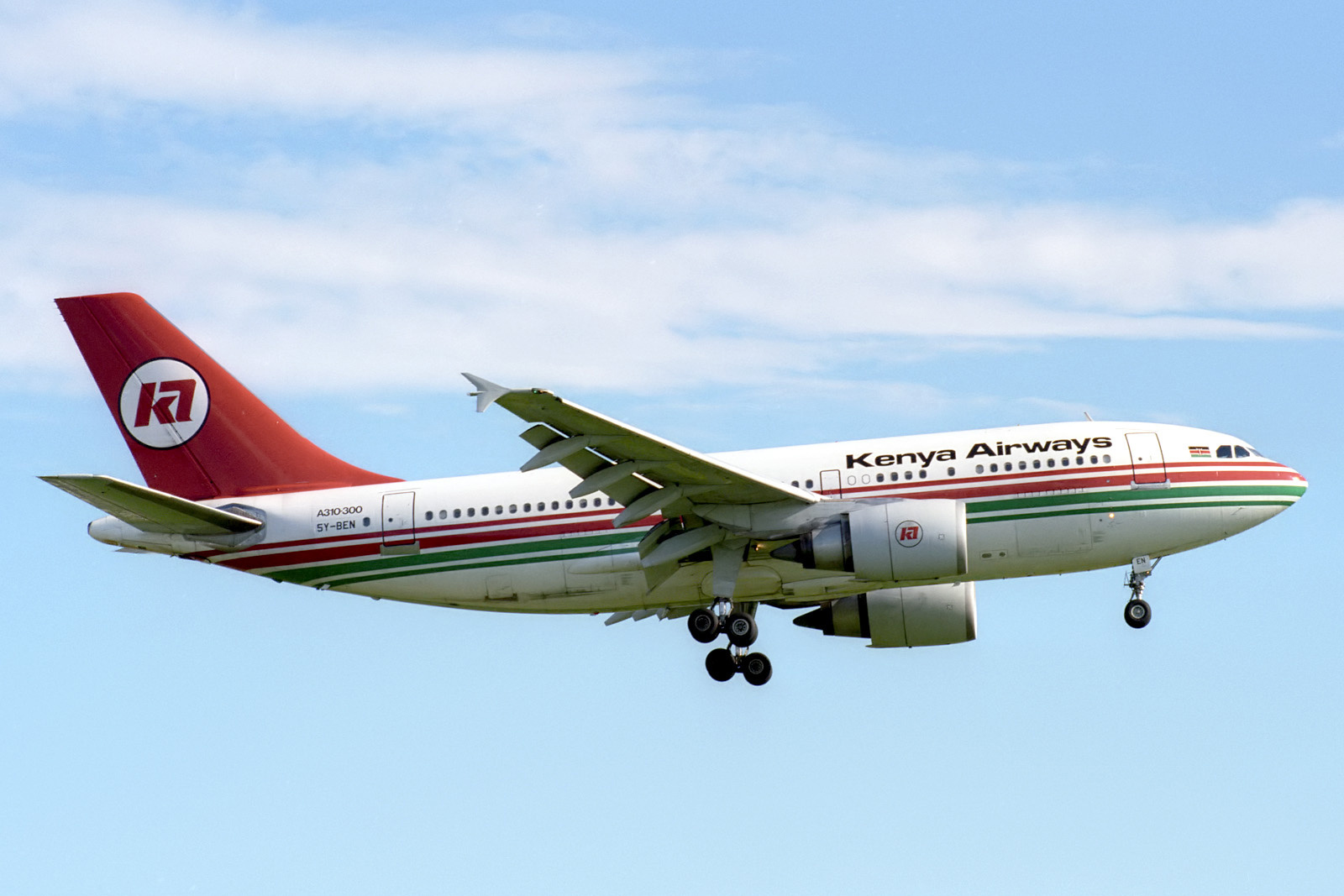
- 5Y-BEN, the aircraft involved in the accident, photographed in 1999

Accident
- Date: 30 January 2000
- Summary: False stall warning leading to pilot error and controlled flight into water
- Site: Atlantic Ocean, East of Félix-Houphouët-Boigny International Airport, Abidjan, Ivory Coast; 05°13′33.3″N 03°56′11.7″W

Aircraft
- Aircraft type: Airbus A310-304
- Aircraft name: Harambee Star
- Operator: Kenya Airways
- IATA flight No.: KQ431
- ICAO flight No.: KQA431
- Call sign: KENYA 431
- Registration: 5Y-BEN
- Flight origin: Félix-Houphouët-Boigny International Airport, Abidjan, Ivory Coast
- Stopover: Murtala Muhammed International Airport; Lagos, Nigeria
- Destination: Jomo Kenyatta International Airport; Nairobi, Kenya
- Occupants: 179
- Passengers: 169
- Crew: 10
- Fatalities: 169
- Injuries: 10
- Survivors: 10

Kenya Airways Flight 431 was an international scheduled Abidjan–Lagos–Nairobi passenger service, operated by Kenyan national airline Kenya Airways. On 30 January 2000, the Airbus A310 serving the flight crashed into the sea off the Ivory Coast, shortly after takeoff at night from Félix-Houphouët-Boigny International Airport, Abidjan. There were 179 people on board, of whom 169 were passengers. Only ten people survived.

With 169 fatalities, the crash was the deadliest involving the Airbus A310 and the deadliest in Ivory Coast history. It was the first fatal crash for Kenya Airways as well as the deadliest.

An investigation was carried out by a commission of inquiry of the Ivorian government, with the French BEA assisting. The investigation concluded that the crash was caused by the flight crew's improper response following the activation of a false stall warning. In the aftermath of the crash, the BEA issued recommendations for better training for pilots in terms of handling a false stall warning. During the course of the investigation, BEA had also learned of new stall recovery procedure(s), stating that such procedure(s) would be included in future flight operation manuals.

== Background ==
=== Aircraft ===
The aircraft involved in the accident was an Airbus A310-304, registration 5Y-BEN, named Harambee Star, which entered service with Kenya Airways in September 1986. The aircraft had logged 58,115 flight hours at the time of the accident. It was powered by two GE CF6-80C2A2 turbofan engines. The port and starboard engines' serial numbers were 690,120 and 690,141, respectively; before the crash, they had accumulated 43,635 and 41,754 flight hours, respectively.

=== Crew ===
The flight was commanded by 44-year-old Captain Paul Muthee, an experienced officer who had logged 11,636 flying hours at the time of the accident, including 1,664 hours on the Airbus A310. He qualified as an A310 pilot on 10 August 1986, and also held ratings for Boeing 737-300, Boeing 737-200, Fokker 50 and Fokker 27, as well as various small aircraft. The first officer was 43-year-old Lazaro Mutumbi Mulli, who had 7,295 hours of flight time, with 5,768 of them on the Airbus A310. First officer Mulli was the pilot flying on the accident flight. Both pilots had performed four landings and four takeoffs on the type at Abidjan Airport; their last takeoff from the airport took place on the day of the accident.

== Accident ==
The flight originated in Nairobi as Flight KQ430, and was due to land in Abidjan after a stopover in Lagos. Many Nigerians who travelled to Dubai for duty-free shopping used this flight. On that day, after being held over Lagos, the flight continued directly to Abidjan because of poor local weather conditions. More specifically, harmattan winds blowing southwards from the Sahara made skies over Lagos unusually hazy on that day, and all incoming flights at Lagos Airport were halted.

After a three-hour layover, the aircraft took off for Lagos at 21:08 GMT. Just seconds after takeoff, at the moment when the first officer requested the landing gear to be retracted, the stall warning sounded in the cockpit. The landing gear remained down. In response, the crew put the aircraft into a controlled descent. The first officer told the captain to silence the stall warning. The Ground proximity warning system (GPWS) then sounded briefly, though the radio altimeter sent out warnings seconds after, cutting off the GPWS warning. The master warning then sounded, indicating that the aircraft was overspeeding, at which point captain Muthee shouted, "go up," but the aircraft was descending too quickly to recover. The aircraft crashed into the Atlantic Ocean, 2 kilometres (1.2 mi; 1.1 nmi) east of the airport, off the Ivory Coast. The airframe was completely destroyed by the impact.

Transcript of the CVR of Kenya Airways Flight 431
# = Expletive; * = Unintelligible word; [ ] = Commentary; CAM = Cockpit Area Microphone
Time	Source	Content
21:08:18,1	[start of engine spool up]	
21:08:18,4	Captain	Thrust SRS and runway
21:08:20,8	First officer	Checks
21:08:21,9	[CAM level increases significantly, intermittently at first]	
21:08:28,7	First officer	[Unintelligible]
21:08:29	Captain	Take off power is set
21:08:30,4	First Officer	Okay
21:08:37,1	Captain	One hundred knots
21:08:37,8	First Officer	Checks
21:08:50,7	Captain	V one and rotate
21:08:55,1	[mechanical sound transmitted through the structure (recorded only on the CAM) consistent with normal nose gear extension]	
21:08:56,1	[click sound consistent with trim switch]	
21:08:56,7	Captain	Positive.
21:08:57,2	[subtle click]	
21:08:57,4	First Officer	Positive rate of climb, gear up
21:08:59,1	[Start of audible stall warning]	
21:09:00,4	[unidentified noise for approximately two seconds]	
21:09:03,7	Captain	Uhhoo [exclamation/surprise/stress]
21:09:07,8	Radio altimeter	three hundred
21:09:10,9	First Officer	ahhh?
21:09:14	First officer	What's the problem?
21:09:15,8	Radio altimeter	Two hundred
21:09:16,1	[amplitude of CAM reduces for 0,2 second - possible physical tape damage]	
21:09:18,5	First officer	Silence the horn!
21:09:19,3	Radio altimeter	One hundred.
21:09:20,3	[End of audible stall warning]	
21:09:20,9	Ground proximity warning system	[Sound of first 50 milliseconds of GPWS warning (Whoop-)]
21:09:21,4	Radio altimeter	Fifty.
21:09:22,1	Radio altimeter	For-
21:09:22,5	Radio altimeter	Thir-, twenty-, ten
21:09:22,5	[start of continuous repetitive chime - master warning]	
21:09:22,9	Captain	Go up!
21:09:23,9	[End of continuous repetitive chime - master warning]	
21:09:24,0	[First sound of impact]	
21:09:27,6	End of recording	

=== Search and rescue ===
Following the crash of Flight 431, controllers in Abidjan quickly activated the crash siren. An alert was issued to Ivory Coast Air Force, Ivory Coast Fire and Rescue Service, airport officials and French gendarmerie stationed at the airport. French firemen arrived at the beach on 21:15 GMT. Helicopters and multiple aircraft were dispatched to search for the crash site. The airline set up a crisis centre at the InterContinental Hotel in Nairobi, while pleasure boats and tugboats assisted in the search and rescue operation. Multiple ambulances were dispatched and put on standby at a nearby quay.

The nighttime conditions were described as very dark, and the presence of fog further hampered the search and rescue efforts. Strong currents in the area also posed risks to divers and rescue personnel. Rescue personnel also had to take a detour to the crash site due to the absence of a quay near the runway. The aerial search had to be suspended due to the inclement weather. The late response of the rescuers led to the deaths of those who initially survived the crash. At times, helicopters flew above the survivors, but the rescuers did not manage to see them. According to Samuel Aigbe, a Nigerian survivor, there were lots of screams at the crash site just minutes after the crash. This was corroborated by testimony from another Nigerian survivor, Fransisca Gyindobla Sambo. A few hours later, the screams died out.

At midnight on 31 January, one of the pleasure boats reported a strong odor from kerosene in the area, east from the runway extended centre line. A pleasure boat then reported large quantities of debris and was immediately followed by shouts from survivors. The first survivor was rescued at 00:20 GMT, and within 15 minutes, another three survivors were rescued. They were immediately transported to a nearby quay for further treatment. A French passenger managed to swim for 2 km (1.2 mi) to the shore before finally being found by authorities.

The search and rescue continued until the noon of 31 January, after authorities reported "no chance of finding any more people". In total, 12 survivors had been rescued from the crash site. A total of 70 bodies had also been recovered from the crash site. The recovery operation lasted from 1 February - 2 March. Search and rescue personnel managed to recover 146 bodies, while 23 bodies were missing. During the operation, a Kenyan diver drowned while trying to recover the victims.

== Victims ==
Seating chart of flight 431 showing locations of survivors and equipment

There were 169 casualties out of 179 people on board the aircraft. Most of the passengers and crew were reported to be Nigerians. Two of the crew members on board worked for KLM. The 168 people who lost their lives whose nationalities are known came from 33 countries; the nationality of one additional deceased victim was not determined. Following is a list of the nationalities of the deceased:

Nationality	Number
Nigeria	84
Kenya	20
India	8
"Congo" (specific country undisclosed)	5
Uganda	5
Madagascar	4
Senegal	3
Togo	3
Canada	2
Ivory Coast	2
Ethiopia	2
France	2
Ghana	2
Iran	2
Mali	2
Netherlands	2
Philippines	2
Rwanda	2
United States	2
Zambia	2
Belgium	1
Burkina Faso	1
Burundi	1
Chad	1
Gambia	1
Guinea	1
Ireland	1
Liberia	1
Mauritania	1
Spain	1
Tanzania	1
Zimbabwe	1
Undetermined	1
Total (33 nationalities)	169

Powerboat operators and fishermen extracted at least seven of the survivors from the water. Of those survivors, three were Nigerian, one was Kenyan, one was Gambian, one was Indian, and one was Rwandan. Of the twelve initial survivors, two died in the hospital. Of the ten ultimate survivors, nine received serious injuries and one received minor injuries. Four survivors received first-degree burns from contact with jet fuel in the water. The survivors included two women; a Malagasy and a Nigerian, and eight men; four Nigerians, a Gambian, a French, an Indian, and a Rwandan. The entire crew of ten died in the accident.

The University Hospital Medical Center at Treichville in Abidjan examined the deceased. The center identified 103 of the bodies and was unable to identify the other 43. Of the deceased, the following causes of death were established: 108 died from serious poly-traumatic injuries, 22 died from a combination of drowning and serious poly-traumatic injuries, and 15 died solely from drowning. The hospital could not determine the injuries sustained by one of the 146 bodies. According to the autopsy reports, a violent deceleration or a twisting or cutting action resulted in the injuries. Forty-three of the deceased received first-degree burns due to contact with the jet fuel spilled in the water. The pilots died from poly-traumatic injuries; they also received first-degree burns from the jet fuel.

== Investigation ==
The Bureau of Enquiry and Analysis for Civil Aviation Safety (BEA), the accident investigation authority of France, assisted in the search for the flight recorders. The Transportation Safety Board of Canada (TSB) analysed the flight safety recorders. The Ministry of Transport of the Ivory Coast published the original French-language accident report and the BEA published its English version of the report.

The flight data recorder (FDR) was located by recovery team on 2 February at a depth of 50 meters, located among the wreckage of the aircraft. The FDR was eventually sent to Ottawa on 21 February and a readout was conducted on 24 February. The cockpit voice recorder (CVR) was recovered on 24 February in the same area where the FDR had been found. It was sent to Canada on the very same day. The CVR managed to record the last 30 minutes of the flight and investigators managed to produce a transcript from the readout. The flight data recorder, however, had recorded values unrelated to the flight and therefore was unusable.

The crash site was mapped by authorities from 21 - 24 March 2001 and an underwater mapping was conducted on 12 - 16 April 2001. The wreckage was spread over an area of 150 meters wide and 450 meters long, with a various depths of 40 to 50 meters. The debris from the wreckage had spread to various directions due to the strong underwater currents in the area. According to investigators, several debris, including half of the aircraft's main landing gear and the fin, had been recovered on beaches nearby.

=== Stall warning ===
Several scenarios may have caused the activation of the aircraft's stall warning aboard Flight 431, including an incorrect configuration on take-off, an incorrect speed indication, a loss of engines thrust, an uncommanded slats retraction, a shift of the aircraft's center of gravity, or an uncommanded deployment of the thrust reversers and spoilers, all of which were ruled out due to a lack of evidence. There was no evidence that the stall warning had activated due to a true stall condition, so a false alarm was the most likely scenario.

A false alarm might have been caused by a faulty Flight Warning Computer (FWC), leading to the activation of the stall aural warning, with or without the stick shaker. A damaged angle of attack sensor and an erroneous calculation on the speed could also produce a false stall warning. These were all possible sources of the false alarm aboard Flight 431; investigators could not determine the source due to a lack of data.

=== Pilot's action ===
The occurrence of a stall condition is extremely rare during an aircraft's take-off or climb phase. Recovery procedures for stall are mainly applied for an approach or enroute phase. Flight crew are not trained to handle a stall condition during take-off or climb phase.

The described procedure in Airbus' Flight Crew Operation Manual (FCOM) stated that in case of the presence of a stall warning with the activation of the stick shaker, flight crew should immediately and simultaneously apply full maximum engine thrust and reduction on the aircraft's pitch attitude and it should remain in that position until the stick shaker stops. The stick shaker should have immediately stopped by the time the flight crew applied this procedure and the pitch attitude should be maintained for some period of time so that the aircraft could gain more speed while also minimizing the loss of altitude.

On the accident flight, First Officer Mulli (the pilot flying) immediately applied the supposed recovery procedure as soon as the stall warning appeared. The aural stall warning combined with the activation of the stick shaker would make the First Officer maintain his action. The change in the aircraft's pitch to nose down attitude would also cause the First Officer to feel like the aircraft was actually descending due to the change in vertical acceleration. By putting the aircraft into a nose down position, he expected to stop the stall warning, which did not happen until the aircraft reached a very low altitude.

A false alarm could be identified by the flight crew had the information on a red and black strips been displayed by the primary flight display. As the stall warning immediately sounded during the first 5 seconds of take-off, along with the activation of the master warning, the supposed information on the strips did not appear on the flight display.

While Flight 431 was descending towards the sea, the flight crew were not aware of this. The radio altimeter callouts should have made the crew to be aware on the situation. As it began to reach a very low altitude with a threat of impact with the sea, the ground proximity warning system (GPWS) should have warned the crew on the impending collision. However, the warning immediately ceased and had only able to sound for just 50 milliseconds (a mere "Whoop-") as the stall warning and the overspeed warning took priority over the GPWS warning.

Investigators concluded that First Officer Mulli's action was caused by several reasons; the unexpected type of warning (in this case a stall warning) during the phase of the flight, the aural warning and the stick shaker activation combined with the lack of visual reference on board as the flight took off towards the sea in night time condition, and the continued activation of the stick shaker despite his actions.

=== Conclusion ===
The final report was published approximately two years after the crash. The investigation concluded the cause of the crash as follows:

The Commission of Inquiry concluded that the cause of the accident to flight KQ 431 on 30 January 2000 was a collision with the sea that resulted from the pilot flying applying one part of the procedure, by pushing forward on the control column to stop the stick shaker, following the initiation of a stall warning on rotation, while the airplane was not in a true stall situation.

The following elements contributed to the accident:

1. the pilot flying's action on the control column put the airplane into a descent without the crew realizing it, despite the radio altimeter callouts;
2. the GPWS warnings that could have alerted the crew to an imminent contact with the sea were masked by the priority stall and overspeed warnings, in accordance with the rules on the prioritization of warnings;
3. the conditions for a takeoff performed towards the sea and at night provided no external visual references that would have allowed the crew to be aware of the direct proximity of the sea.

In the aftermath of the crash, the investigation team recommended civil aviation authorities to ask operators and training organizations under their authority to include trainings on recognizing false stall alarm during phases of flight close to the ground. During the course of the investigation, the team also learnt on new stall recovery procedure from Airbus, where flight crew should have minimized loss of altitude by applying maximum thrust and use optimal pitch. If the aircraft is below 20,000ft, then the recommended pitch attitude is 10 degrees up.

The report also mentioned on the inefficient rescue operation in Abidjan. Survivors commented on the slow pace of the rescue operation and argued that other survivors might have not died had rescuers arrived in time. The lack of maritime equipment, gaps in communication, and inclement weather and situation in the crash site contributed to the difficulty of the rescue operation. The commission recommended civil authorities in coastal airports to ensure the availability of appropriate equipment to ease the search and rescue efforts.

== Aftermath ==
Kenya Airways compensated the families of 60 deceased Nigerians; each family received US$130,000 (equivalent to $236,375 in 2025).

== See also ==
- Kenya Airways Flight 507
- List of accidents and incidents involving commercial aircraft
- TWA Flight 843, another accident triggered by a false stall warning
- Colgan Air Flight 3407, another accident triggered by a false stall warning
