= Tchicaya U Tam'si Prize for African Poetry =

Tchicaya U Tam'si Prize for African poetry
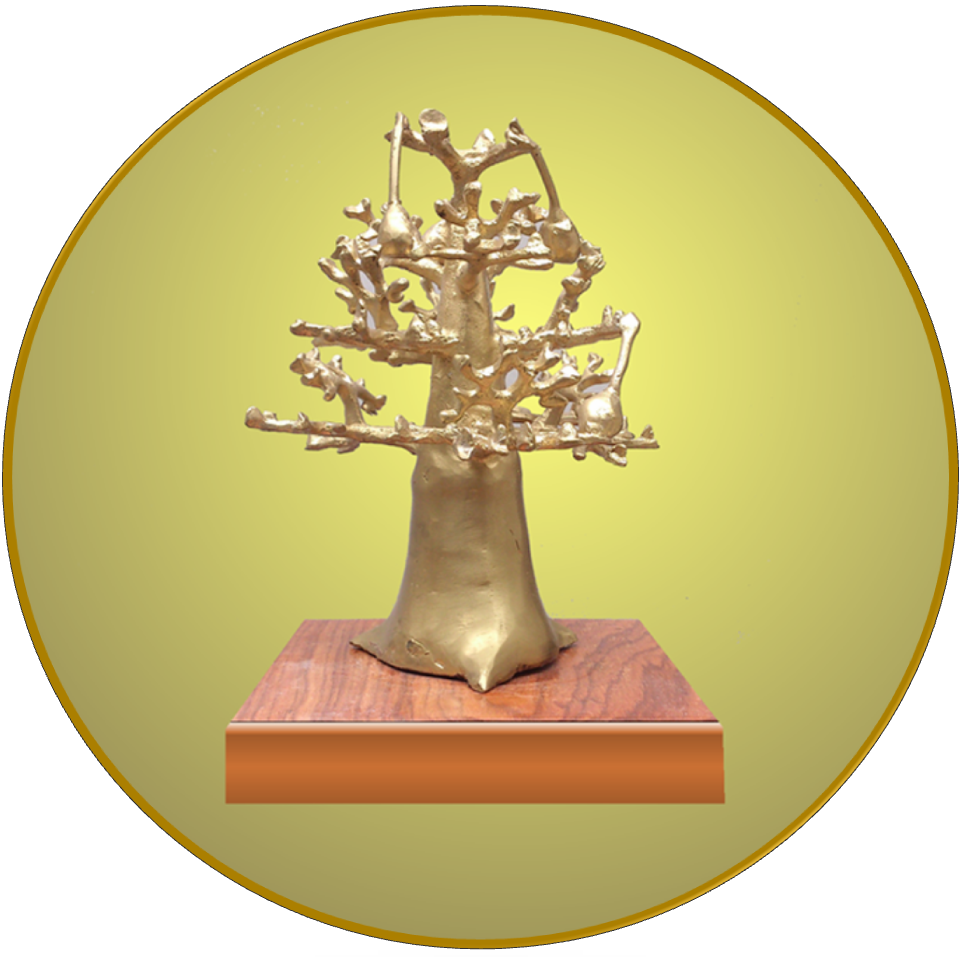
- Country: Morocco
- Presented by: Assilah city's Forum
- Reward: $10,000
- First award: 1989
- Final award: 2018
- Currently held by: Senegal Amadou Lamine Sall

The Tchicaya U Tam'si Prize for African Poetry, established in 1989, rewards a writer who is distinguished by an innovative poetic work, of high artistic value. The prize is named after Congolese writer Tchicaya U Tam'si (1931–1988).

It was created during the Assilah city's Forum (Morocco), on the initiative of Muhammad Benaissa, former Moroccan minister of culture and current mayor of Assilah. The prize is generally awarded in August, during the international and cultural moussem (festival) of Assilah.

Alioune Badara Beye chaired the jury of the 2014 edition.

== Winners ==
- 1989 : Edouard Maunick (Mauritius)
- 1990 : Jean-Luc Raharimanana (Madagascar)
- 1991 : René Depestre (Haiti)
- 1993 : Mazisi Kunene (South Africa)
- 1996 : Ahmed Abdel Muti Hijazi (or Mo'ti Higazi) (Egypt)
- 1999 : Jean-Baptiste Tati Loutard (Congo-Brazzaville)
- 2001 : Vera Duarte (Cape Verde)
- 2004 : Abdelkarim Tabbal (Morocco)
- 2008 : Niyi Osundare (Nigeria)
- 2011 : Fama Diagne Sène (Senegal) and Mehdi Akhrif (Morocco)
- 2014 : Josué Guébo (Côte d'Ivoire) for Think of Lampedusa.
- 2018 : Amadou Lamine Sall (Senegal).
