= 2019 in Ivory Coast =

- Decades: 1990s; 2000s; 2010s; 2020s
- See also: Other events of 2019; Timeline of Ivorian history

Events in the year 2019 in Ivory Coast.

== Incumbents ==
- President: Alassane Ouattara
- Prime Minister: Amadou Gon Coulibaly

== Events ==
- 6 February – Former president Laurent Gbagbo is cleared of crimes against humanity and released to Belgium.
- 6 August – Ivory Coast and Ghana set a base price of US $2,600 per ton for 2020-21 cocoa prices.
- 24 December: Presidential candidate and former rebel leader Guillaume Soro diverts his plane to Ghana after the government issued an arrest warrant for him.

=== Sports ===
- 14 September to 18 October: Scheduled date for the 2019 World Draughts Championship, to be held in Yamoussoukro

== Deaths ==
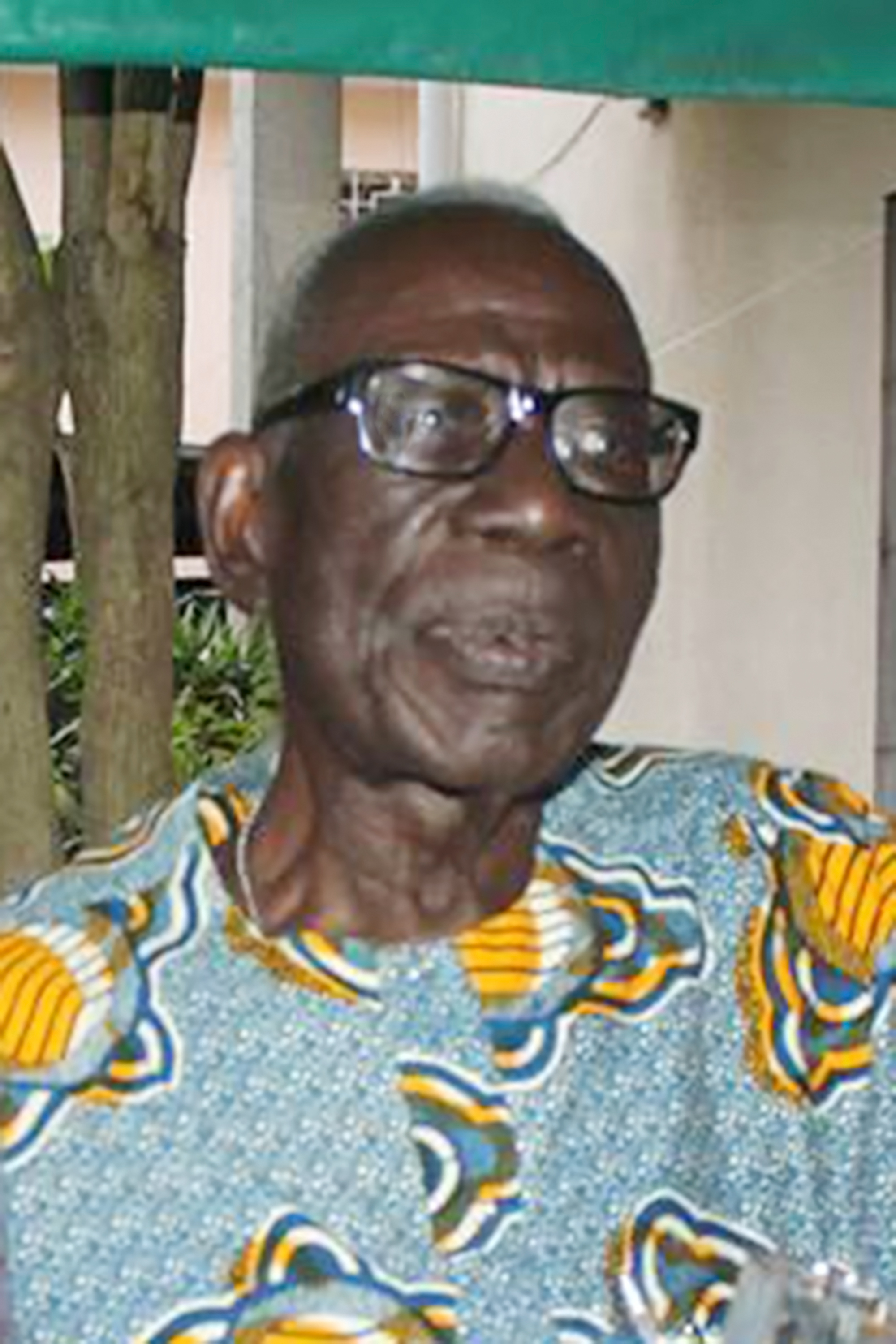
Bernard Binlin Dadié

- 19 January – Barthélémy Kotchy, writer and politician (b. 1934)
- 9 March – Bernard Binlin Dadié, novelist, playwright and poet, Minister of Culture (b. 1916)
- 12 August – DJ Arafat, 33, singer and drummer; motorcycle accident
