= Amadou Lamine Sall =

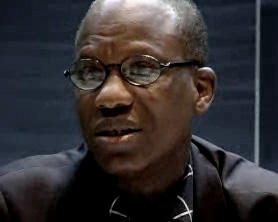
- Amadou Lamine Sall
- Born: Amadou Lamine Sall; March 26, 1951; Kaolack, Senegal
- Notable awards: Tchicaya U Tam'si Prize for African Poetry 2018

Amadou Lamine Sall, born on March 26, 1951, in Kaolack, Senegal, is one of the major poets of contemporary French-speaking Africa. Leopold Senghor said of him that he was the most talented poet of his generation. He is the recipient of the 2018 edition of the Tchicaya U Tam'si Prize for African Poetry.

== Biography ==
Amadou Lamine Sall born in 1951 in Kaolack, is the Founder of the African House of International Poetry, and he presides over the destinies of the International Biennale of Poetry in Dakar, Senegal. Winner in 1991 of the Prix du rayonnement de la langue et de la littérature françaises, awarded by the French Academy He is the author of numerous anthologies of poetry that have been translated into several languages. In October 2008 he wrote several poems about Arthur Rimbaud while he was in residence at the Maison Rimbaud in Charleville-Mézières. Amadou Lamine Sall always writes his poems in free verse, with very little punctuation.

Amadou Lamine Sall's poetry is on the curriculum of many universities and his writing is also the subject of several doctoral theses.

== Bibliography ==
- Mante des aurores, Nouvelles Éditions Africaines du Sénégal, 1979.
- Comme un iceberg en flammes, Nouvelles Éditions Africaines du Sénégal, 1982.
- Femme fatale et errante ou Locataire du néant, Nouvelles Éditions Africaines du Sénégal, 1988.
- Kamandalu, Nouvelles Éditions Africaines du Sénégal, 1990.
- Anthologie des poètes du Sénégal, Édition le Cherche Midi.
- Nouvelle Anthologie de la poésie nègre et malgache de langue française avec Charles Carrère, Éditions Simoncini.
- Regards sur la Francophonie, Éditions Maguilen, 1991.
- J'ai mangé tout le pays de la nuit suivi de Problématique d'une nouvelle poésie africaine de langue française : Le long sommeil des épigones, Nouvelles Éditions Africaines du Sénégal, 1994.
- Le Prophète ou le cœur aux mains de pain, Éditions Feu de brousse, 1997.
- Amantes d'Aurores, Éditions Les Écrits des Forges (Québec) en coédition avec les Éditions Feu de brousse (Sénégal), 1998.
- Odes nues, Éditions En Vues, 1998.
- Les veines sauvages, Éditions Le Corbet, 2001.
- Noces célestes pour Léopold Sédar Senghor, Éditions Feu de brousse, 2004.
- Poèmes d'Afrique pour enfants, Anthologie, Édition le Cherche Midi. 2004
- Colore d’estasi. Antologia poetica, Trieste, FrancoPuzzoEditore, 2005 (Prix international de poésie de Trieste 2004)
- Ailleurs - Episode I: Charleville-Mézières 2008 : une année en poésie, poésie (collectif), éd. Musée Rimbaud, Charleville-Mézières, 2009
- Le Rêve du Bambou, Éditions Feu de brousse, 2010.
