= Charles Nokan =

Ivorian academic and writer (1936–2022)

- Born: Charles Zégoua Gbessi Nokan; 28 December 1936; Yamoussoukro, Ivory Coast, French West Africa
- Died: 1 November 2022 (aged 85); Abidjan, Ivory Coast
- Education: University of Poitiers; University of Paris
- Occupations: Professor; Writer

Charles Zégoua Gbessi Nokan (28 December 1936 – 1 November 2022) was an Ivorian academic and writer. He was a member of the Académie des sciences, des arts, des cultures d'Afrique et des diasporas africaines and the author of several works on theatre, poetry and novels. He was a recipient of the Bernard Dadié national grand prize for literature in 2014.

== Biography ==
Nokan was born in Yamoussoukro on 28 December 1936 to Kalou Konan. After his primary studies in Yamoussoukro and Toumodi, he spent his secondary studies in France. He studied at the University of Poitiers and the University of Paris, earning a license in sociology and a doctorate in philosophy. He became a professor at the Université Félix Houphouët-Boigny in Abidjan.

Nokan published several works throughout his career, such as Le soleil noir point, Violent était le vent, and Petites rivières. He published his first theatrical work, Les malheurs de Tchakô, in 1970. His autobiography, titled Tel que je suis and published in 2014, earned him the Bernard Dadié national grand prize for literature. A Marxist, his works were, in his opinion, political and literary; they were combat, song, and dance.

Charles Nokan died in Abidjan on 1 November 2022, at the age of 85.

== Publications ==
=== Theatre ===
- Le soleil noir point (1962)
- Les Malheurs de Tchakö (1968)
- Abraha Pokou, ou une grande Africaine; Suivi de : La Voix grave d'Ophimoï (1970)
- La traversée de la nuit dense ou les Travailleurs africains en France; suivi de Cris rouges (1972)
- Abraha Pokou et trois autres pièces (1984)
- Johoré (2014)
- Fako et sa conscience (2015)

=== Poetry ===
- Les Petites rivières (1983)
- Cri (1989)
- Yah et Môni (quatrains) : suivi de: les odeurs de l'existence; le lavage de la vie; le testament (2014)

=== Novels ===
- Violent était le vent (1966)
- Abraha Pokou, ou une grande Africaine; Suivi de : La Voix grave d'Ophimoï (1970)
- Mon chemin débouche sur la grand-route (1985)
- Yassoi refusa l'orange mûre de Nianga (2010)
- Tout grand changement est un ouragan (2012)

=== Essays ===
- L'être, le désêtre et le non-être (2000)

=== Autobiography ===
- Tel que je suis

== Awards ==
- Bernard Dadié national grand prize for literature (2014)
- Grand Prix Kaïlcedra des lycées et collèges (2015)
