= Judicial system of Ivory Coast =

The judicial system of Ivory Coast was greatly influenced by its time as a French colony. The system has two levels. The lower courts include courts of appeals, courts of first instance, courts of assize, and the justice of the peace courts. The upper level includes the Supreme Court, the High Court of Justice, and the State Security Court. The remainder of the professional judiciary exists in the Central Administration of the Ministry of Justice. All members of the professional judiciary must hold a bachelor of law degree and can not hold an elected office while a member.

== Jurisdictions ==
Ivory Coast is organized with three types of jurisdictions: non-permanent jurisdictions, permanent jurisdictions, and arbitral jurisdictions.

== Upper courts ==
The upper courts of Ivory Coast include the Supreme Court, the High Court of Justice, and the State Security Court.

=== Supreme Court ===
The Supreme Court of Ivory Coast (Supreme Court of Côte d'Ivoire) is organized into the Judicial, Audit, Constitutional, and Administrative Chambers.

==== List of presidents ====
- Ernest Boka (c. 1960-1963)
- Alphonse Boni (1963-1989)
- Lanzeny Coulibaly (1990-1993)
- Mamadou Koui (1994-2000)
- Guillaume Folquet (2000)
- Tia Kone (2000-2011)
- Mamadou Kone (2011-2015)
- René Aphing Kouassi (2015-2020)

=== High Court of Justice ===
The High Court of Justice has non-permanent jurisdiction to judge members of the government over offenses that they may have committed violating penal code while in office.

== Lower courts ==
The lower courts of Ivory Coast include the courts of appeals, the courts of first instance, the courts of assize, and the justice of peace courts. These were established by Presidential Decree.

=== Courts of appeals ===
Ivory Coast has three courts of appeals in Abidjan, Bouaké, and Daloa. These courts have appellate jurisdiction over the courts of first instance and the courts of assize. The chamber of appeals consists of a president and two appeal judges.

An investigating chamber, composed of a president and two appeal judges, holds hearings in each appeals court. They may refer cases back to courts of assize or correctional tribunals.

Correctional tribunals judge misdemeanors and felonies, and only judge cases referred to it by an investigating chamber. Correctional tribunals consist of a president, an investigating judge, and a deputy prosecutor of the republic. Hearings in these tribunals are public, and any mode of evidence can be used to prove offenses. Judges must base their decision upon evidence provided during the hearing. The suspect and witnesses after having taken an oath are questioned and heard by the president. After the hearing and investigation, the prosecutor of the republic makes submissions. The suspect then presents a defense. The prosecutor can respond to this defense, but the suspect always receives the chance to have the last word. Judgement is either made during this session or at a later date.

=== Courts of first instance ===
Ivory Coast has nine courts of first instance in Abidjan, Yopougon, Bouaké, Bouaflé, Daloa, Man, Abengourou, Korhogo, and Ganoa. These courts have original jurisdiction over more substantial minor criminal cases with maximum sentences of three months or less, juvenile cases, and more substantial civil cases.

=== Courts of assize ===
The court of assize is made up of a court proper, consisting of a president, two assessors, and six jurors.

=== Justice of peace courts ===
The justice of peace courts have original jurisdiction to hear minor civil and criminal cases.

== Traditional law ==
In many rural parts of Ivory Coast, traditional customary law and traditional institutions constitute the lowest levels of justice, where the formal court system has yet to establish administration. Grand Mediators settle disputes when traditional law and means cannot.

== Criticism ==
The judicial system of Ivory Coast has been found to often be unreliable.

According to the Human Rights Watch 2018 World Report, the system is slowly being strengthened. The report praised the country for holding the courts of assize more often, the expansion of its court system, and its establishment of a legal aid fund. The report also criticized what it called "fundamental problems," however, including the lack of judicial independence and an excessive use of pretrial detention, especially in cases involving political figures.
