= Josué Guébo =

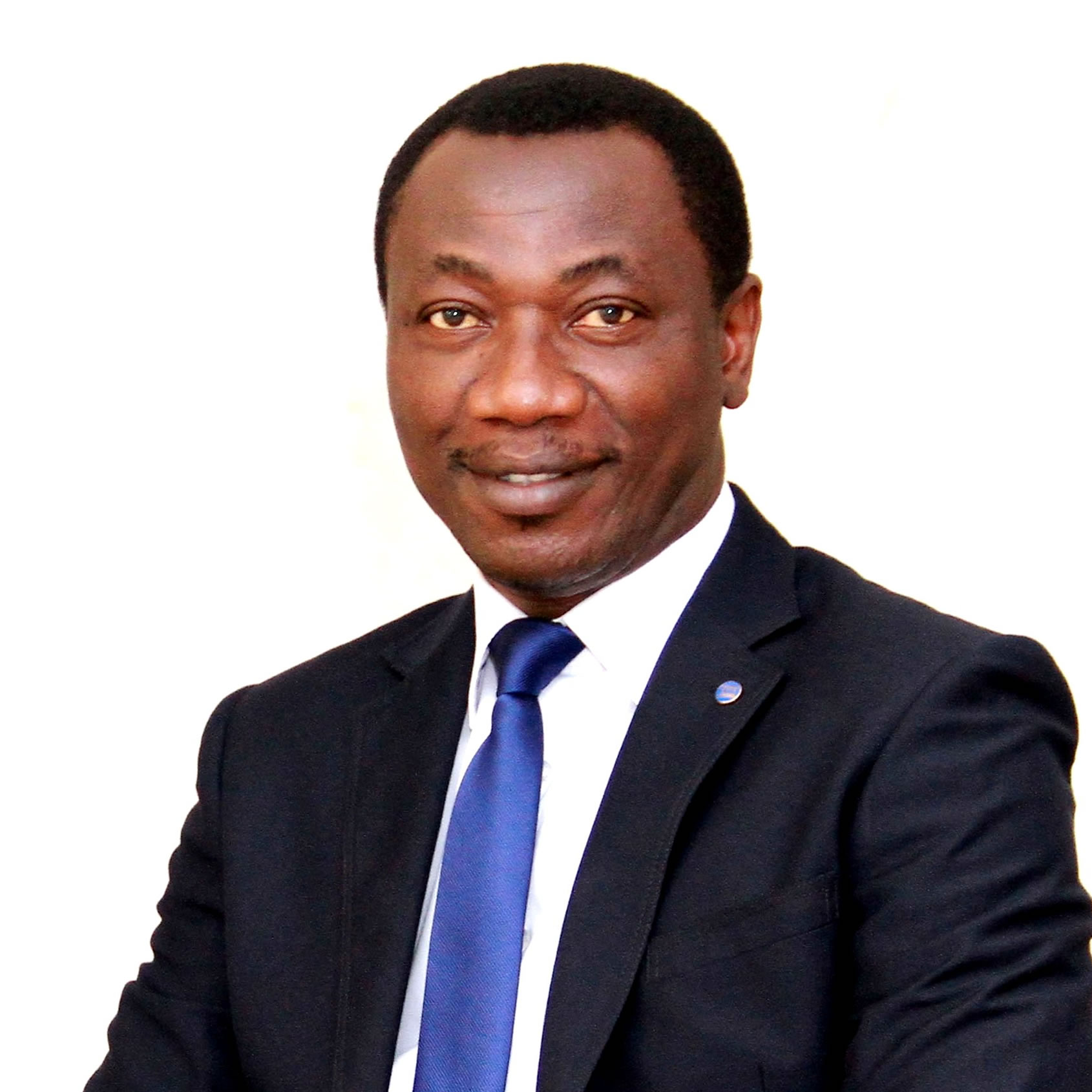
- Josué Guébo in Abidjan, Cocody, July 18, 2016
- Born: Josué Yoroba Guébo; July 21, 1972; Abidjan, Côte d'Ivoire
- Writing career
- Notable awards: Tchicaya U Tam'si Prize for African Poetry 2014; Bernard Dadié Grand Prize 2017

Josué Yoroba Guébo, or Josué Guébo (born July 21, 1972), is an Ivorian academic and man of letters. A major figure of African contemporary poetry, he is also a short story writer, playwright, essayist and author of children's literature. 6th President of the Ivoirian Writers' Association (AECI), he is the recipient of the Bernard Dadié Grand Prize and the U Tam'si Prize.

A philosopher, he is the founder and Chairman of the Ivoirian Society of Transhumanism (SIVOT).

== Biography ==
Josué Yoroba Guébo was born on July 21, 1972, in Abidjan, the economic capital of Côte d'Ivoire. He started writing poetry while still young. He wrote his first poem when he was twelve or thirteen years old. His interest for literature led him to read the works of Aimé Césaire or those of Paul Verlaine. He was also influenced by the great African writers he discovered during his school and university course. Holder of a PhD in History and Philosophy of Sciences, Josué Guébo is also teacher-researcher.

== Bibliography ==
Poetry

- 2009: L'or n'a jamais été un métal (Vallesse, Abidjan);
- 2010: D'un mâle quelconque (Apopsix, Paris);
- 2011: Carnet de doute (Panafrika/Silex/Nouvelles du sud, Dakar);
- 2011: Mon pays, ce soir (Panafrika/Silex/Nouvelles du sud, Dakar);
- 2014: Songe à Lampedusa (Panafrika/Silex/Nouvelles du sud, Paris);
- 2015: L’Enfant qui disparaît est une lettre d’alphabet (Panafrika/Silex/Nouvelles du sud, Paris);
- 2015: Dapidahoun, chantiers d'espérances (Les Editions du Net);
- 2016: My country, tonight (Action Books), translated by Todd Fredson;
- 2016: Aux chemins de Babo Naki (l'Harmattan, Paris);
- 2017: Think of Lampedusa (ImprintUniversity of Nebraska Press), Introduction by John Keene, translated by Todd Fredson;

Children's Books

- 2013: Le père Noël aime l'attiéké (Les classiques ivoiriens);
- 2018: Le père Noël danse le Ziglibity (Eburnie édition);
- 2018: Pourquoi l'homme, le chien et le chat parlent des langues différentes (Eburnie édition);
- 2018: Destins de clandestins (Vallesse édition).

Essays

- 2015: Une histoire de l'objectivité : L’objectivité dans les sciences, de Parménide à l’intelligence artificielle (Presses Académiques Francophones);
- 2016: Les Sommeils des indépendances, Chroniques pour une Afrique intégrée (Harmattan Côte-d'Ivoire);
- 2016: Dictionnaire des mots et expressions du français ivoirien (l'Harmattan, Paris);
- 2018: Chroniques africaines et aphorismes (Dhart, Québec).

Theatre

- 2016: Le blues des oranges (Les Editions du Net).

Collective Works

- 2007: La paix par l'écriture (Vallesse, Abidjan);
- 2010: Des paroles de Côte d'Ivoire pour Haïti, notre devoir de solidarité (Ceda/Nei);
- 2013: Monsieur Mandela (Panafrika/Silex/Nouvelles du sud, Paris);
- 2015: Ce soir quand tu verras Patrice (Panafrika/Silex/Nouvelles du sud, Paris);
- 2017: Africa Study Bible, NLT (Tyndale house, Carol Stream, Illinois);
- 2019: Dadié, l'homme de tous les continents. Cent écrivains du monde rendent hommage au centenaire vivant (Édtitions Eburnie, Abidjan).

== Awards ==
=== Literary awards ===
- 1998: Award of RFI writing contest " 3 heures pour écrire " (3 hours to write);
- 2000: First AECI National Poetry Prize for " Noël, un fusil nous est né " (Christmas, a gun is born to us);
- 2007: First Prize in Poetry " Les Manuscrits d'or " for " C'était hier " (That Was Yesterday);
- 2007: First Prize in Short Stories " Les Manuscrits d'or " for " Confidences d'une pièce de 25 Francs " (Confessions of a 25 francs coin);
- 2014: Tchicaya U Tam'si Prize for African Poetry for Think of Lampedusa;
- 2017: Bernard Dadié national grand prize for literature for Aux chemins de Babo Naki (Babo Naki's paths).

=== Other distinctions ===
- 2012 : Knight of the Ivorian Cultural Merit
