= 2010 in Ivory Coast =

- Decades: 1990s; 2000s; 2010s; 2020s
- See also: Other events of 2010; Timeline of Ivorian history

The following lists events that happened during 2010 in Ivory Coast.

== Incumbents ==
- President:
  - Laurent Gbagbo
  - Alassane Ouattara (from December 4)
- Prime Minister:
  - Guillaume Soro
  - Gilbert Aké (from December 6)

== Events ==
=== October ===
- October 31 - Voters in Ivory Coast go to the polls for the long delayed presidential election.

=== November ===
- November 6 - The Ivory Coast presidential election will go to a second round with President Laurent Gbagbo facing opposition leader Alassane Ouattara.
- November 10 - Ivory Coast defers the second round of voting for the Ivory presidential election to November 28.
- November 27 - Second Ivorian Civil War
  - At least three people die in protests in Ivory Coast over a curfew imposed ahead of the second round of the Ivorian presidential election.
  - Laurent Gbagbo declares a curfew, amid clashes that killed three people ahead of the second round of the presidential election on Sunday.
- November 28 - Voters in Ivory Coast go to the polls for the second round of the Ivorian presidential election with violent clashes having occurred between rival supporters.

=== December ===
- December 2 - Ivory Coast's election commission in Côte d'Ivoire declares Alassane Ouattara the winner of the Ivorian presidential election but the Constitutional Council declares the announcement invalid as it missed the deadline to announce the results.
- December 3 - Incumbent president Laurent Gbagbo is ruled as the election winner in Côte d'Ivoire after the constitutional court overturns provisional results which favoured opposition candidate, former prime minister Alassane Ouattara.
- December 4 - Ivorian presidential election, 2010
  - A swearing-in ceremony for Laurent Gbagbo takes place in Côte d'Ivoire, although world leaders and the election commission back Alassane Ouattara as winner of the presidential election.
  - Côte d'Ivoire experiences a major political crisis.
- December 5 - Former South African President Thabo Mbeki begins mediation efforts in Ivory Coast following the disputed presidential election.
- December 7 - Côte d'Ivoire is expelled from the Economic Community of West African States.
- December 8 - Liberian President Ellen Johnson Sirleaf warns former rebel fighters not to get involved in the crisis in Côte d'Ivoire.
- December 9 - The African Union suspends Côte d'Ivoire following the disputed presidential election.
- December 11 - Ivory Coast President Laurent Gbagbo is to seek talks with rival presidential candidate Alassane Ouattara to end the crisis in the country. The head of the Economic Community of West African States James Victor Gbeho rejects the idea of power-sharing talks.
- December 15 - An alliance of opposition parties that endorse the presidency of Alassane Ouattara in Ivory Coast call for mass protests, following the presidential election.
- December 16 - Opposition protesters in Ivory Coast attempt to seize the state television station in central Abidjan, which is surrounded by the army. At least fifteen people have died in clashes.
- December 18 - Ivory Coast crisis
  - Kenya calls on African nations to oust Ivory Coast incumbent President Laurent Gbagbo from office, by force if necessary, if he does not step down.
  - Laurent Gbagbo orders United Nations peacekeepers to leave the country.
- December 19 - Ivory Coast crisis
  - The United Nations rejects a demand by incumbent Côte d'Ivoire President Laurent Gbagbo to remove its peacekeepers from the country.
  - Hundreds of people are alleged to have been abducted since the election according to the UN.
- December 22 - The World Bank stops financing Côte d'Ivoire.
- December 23 - The United Nations says 173 people have been killed during post-election violence in Ivory Coast.
- December 24 - Ivory Coast crisis
  - The United Nations General Assembly unanimously approves opposition candidate Alassane Ouattara as President of Côte d'Ivoire.
  - State television in Côte d'Ivoire goes off the air outside the capital Abidjan amid a political crisis. The Economic Community of West African States threatens to remove incumbent President Laurent Gbagbo by "legitimate force".
- December 25 - Approximately 14,000 people have fled Côte d'Ivoire and headed to Liberia due to the recent presidential election dispute.
- December 26 - Laurent Gbagbo threatens to treat United Nations peacekeepers of the UNOCI mission as rebels if they do not follow orders and leave.
- December 27 - Alassane Ouattara, the internationally recognised winner of the presidential election in Côte d'Ivoire, calls for a general strike to force Laurent Gbagbo, who is refusing to cede power, to step down.
- December 28 - The leaders of Benin, Cape Verde and Sierra Leone arrive in Côte d'Ivoire to urge Laurent Gbagbo to resign as President.
- December 30 - Côte d'Ivoire's ambassador to the United Nations, Youssoufou Bamba, says the country is on the "brink of genocide".
