= Barthélémy Kotchy =

Ivorian writer and politician (1934–2019)

Barthélémy Kotchy or Barthélémy Kotchy-N'Guessan (Grand-Bassam, 1934 – 19 January 2019) was an Ivorian writer and politician.

He was one of the founders of the Ivorian Popular Front and he was the president of Académie des sciences, des arts, des cultures d'Afrique et des diasporas africaines from 2008. He died in Abidjan on 19 January 2019, aged 84.

== Works ==
- 1982 : Olifant noir; suivi de, Chansons africaines
- 1984 : La critique sociale dans l'œuvre théâtrale de Bernard Dadié
- 1984 : Propos sur la littérature négro-africaine, with Christophe I-Dailly
- 1989 : Une lecture africaine de Léon Gontran Damas
- 1993 : Aimé Césaire, l'homme et l'œuvre, with Lilyan Kesteloot
- 2001 : La correspondance des arts dans la poésie de Senghor : essai
