= Marie Rose Guiraud =

Ivorian dancer (1944–2020)

- Born: 10 September 1944; Kouibly, French West Africa
- Died: 20 April 2020 (aged 75)
- Occupations: Dancer; Choreographer

Marie Rose Guiraud (10 September 1944 – 20 April 2020) was an Ivorian dancer and choreographer. She notably founded the École de danse et d'échange culturel, as well as the troupe Les Guirivoires.
