= 2011 in Ivory Coast =

- Decades: 1990s; 2000s; 2010s; 2020s
- See also: Other events of 2011; Timeline of Ivorian history

The following lists events that happened during 2011 in Ivory Coast.

== Incumbents ==
- President:
  - Laurent Gbagbo (until April 11)
  - Alassane Ouattara
- Prime Minister:
  - Guillaume Soro
  - Gilbert Aké (until April 11)

== Events ==
=== January ===
- January 1 - Mass graves are discovered in Côte d'Ivoire amid other political violence as United Nations peacekeepers come under increased tension in the country when allies of Alassane Ouattara call for a forceful removal of Laurent Gbagbo.
- January 2 - 2010–11 Ivorian crisis
  - Laurent Gbagbo's "Street General" postpones plans for its youth militia to storm the Golf Hotel, where Alassane Ouattara is currently staying, the area surrounded by the New Forces. Supporters of Ouattara renew calls to depose Gbagbo by military intervention.
  - Thousands of refugees flee Ivory Coast to neighbouring countries; at least 18,000 of them to Liberia.
- January 3 - A delegation of African leaders from Benin, Cape Verde, Kenya and Sierra Leone travels to Côte d'Ivoire to offer incumbent President Laurent Gbagbo an amnesty if he resigns from office.
- January 4 - The Economic Community of West African States says the situation in Côte d'Ivoire is still in a "stalemate", amid the threat of force to remove Laurent Gbagbo.
- January 6 - 2010–11 Ivorian crisis
  - At least 14 people in Duékoué are killed in clashes between opposing sides in the presidential election crisis.
  - Ivory Coast's President-elect Alassane Ouattara expresses confidence that military action by other West African nations will remove President Laurent Gbagbo, who refuses to leave office after his defeat in recent presidential elections.
- January 7 - 2010–11 Ivorian crisis
  - Ghana says a threat of force by the Economic Community of West African States to remove President Laurent Gbagbo would "not bring about peace" in the country.
  - Laurent Gbagbo expels the ambassadors for Canada and the United Kingdom from Côte d'Ivoire. Both nations reject the decision, recognizing Alassane Ouattara as the rightful President.
- January 11 - 2010–11 Ivorian crisis
  - At least five people are killed in Abidjan as clashes continue between police and supporters of presidential aspirant Alassane Ouattara.
  - Alassane Ouattara rejects an offer by incumbent Ivorian President Laurent Gbagbo to be Vice President.
- January 13 - Forces loyal to incumbent President Laurent Gbagbo attack and burn United Nations vehicles.
- January 14 - The death toll due to the political crisis in Ivory Coast reaches 247 since the November 28th election.
- January 26 - Laurent Gbagbo orders the seizure of all local branches of the Central Bank of West African States.
- January 29 - The African Union sets up a panel of heads of state to help solve the political crisis in Côte d'Ivoire.

=== February ===
- February 19 - At least two people are killed in Ivory Coast after Ivorian forces open fire on protesters urging the resignation of President Laurent Gbagbo.
- February 25 - Rebels in Ivory Coast seize another town from the control of incumbent President Laurent Gbagbo, who refused to step down following a disputed presidential election. Unrest occurs in the capital Yamoussoukro.
- February 27 - State television is taken off air in Abidjan during clashes between forces loyal to incumbent President Laurent Gbagbo and rival groups.
- February 28 - United Nations Secretary-General Ban Ki-moon says Belarus has "seriously violated" the arms embargo against Ivory Coast, after a delivery of attack helicopters and material to the country.

=== March ===
- March 2 - Private and independent newspapers in Ivory Coast cease publication to protest violence and harassment by supporters of incumbent President Laurent Gbagbo. Radio broadcasts by the BBC and RFI are taken off air.
- March 3 - 2010–11 Ivorian crisis
  - Ivory Coast security forces kill at least six women marching in support of Opposition leader Alassane Ouattara in Abidjan.
  - The United Nations is investigating suspected transfer of weapons from Zimbabwe to Ivory Coast's incumbent President Laurent Gbagbo in violation of UN sanctions.
- March 6 - Fighting erupts in western Ivory Coast between rebels and forces loyal to incumbent President Laurent Gbagbo, with injured people crossing into Liberia.
- March 7 - Rebel forces seize a third town in western Ivory Coast from government forces.
- March 7 - President Laurent Gbagbo nationalises the coffee and cocoa industries which are Ivory Coast's two biggest crops.
- March 8 - Four people are shot dead in Abidjan after a march to protest the killing of seven female demonstrators last week.
- March 10 - The disputed government of Ivory Coast imposes a ban on United Nations and French flights from flying over or landing in the country.
- March 15 - Gunmen shoot four people dead at a roadblock run by supporters of Laurent Gbagbo.
- March 17 - Dozens of people are killed in nationwide violence, as fears of a civil war grow.
- March 18 - 2010–11 Ivorian crisis
  - Laurent Gbagbo calls on civilians to join in the fighting to "neutralise" supporters of Alassane Ouattara.
  - The United Nations says the shelling of a market by security forces yesterday that killed 25 people may constitute a crime against humanity.
- March 19 - Tens of thousands of people from Côte d'Ivoire flee to Liberia due to ongoing violence in the country.
- March 21 - Thousands of supporters of President Laurent Gbagbo gather to enlist in the army.
- March 25 - 2010–11 Ivorian crisis
  - Up to one million people flee Abidjan amid violence.
  - West African leaders urge the United Nations to authorise force to remove President Laurent Gbagbo, who refuses to leave office, from power.
- March 28 - 2010–11 Ivorian crisis
  - Rebel forces loyal to presidential claimant Alassane Ouattara seize the town of Duékoué from government forces.
  - Fighters backing internationally recognised president Alassane Ouattara launch a "general offensive" in the west, centre-west and east of Ivory Coast.
- March 30 - Forces loyal to Alassane Ouattara enter Yamoussoukro.
- March 31 - 2010–11 Ivorian crisis
  - Disputed President Laurent Gbagbo's army chief Phillippe Mangou seeks refuge in the South African ambassador's home in Abidjan.
  - Forces loyal to Ivory Coast's internationally recognised President Alassane Ouattara seize further towns and move into the biggest city Abidjan.
