= Laurent Dona Fologo =

Ivorian politician (1939–2021)

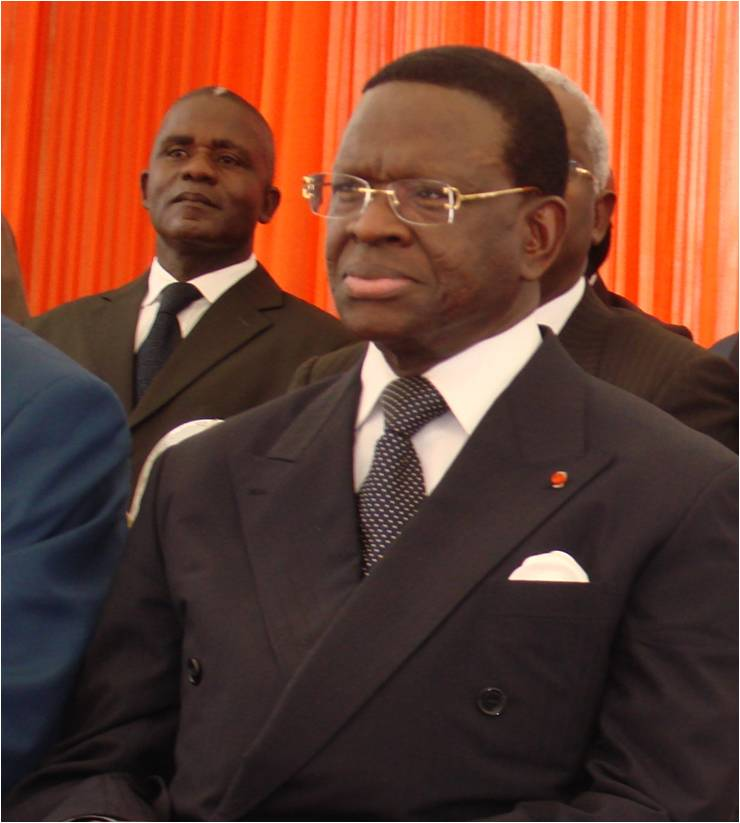
- Laurent Dona Fologo

President of the Economic and Social Council
- In office 12 February 2000 – 19 May 2011

Personal details
- Born: 12 December 1939 Sinématiali, French West Africa
- Died: 5 February 2021 (aged 81) Abidjan, Ivory Coast
- Party: PDCI

Laurent Dona Fologo (12 December 1939 – 5 February 2021) was an Ivorian politician.

== Biography ==
Fologo attended the École supérieure de journalisme de Lille, and subsequently became Editor-in-Chief of the newspaper Fraternité Matin. He then served in various ministerial positions in the cabinet of Félix Houphouët-Boigny and became Secretary General of the Democratic Party of Ivory Coast (PCDI). During the First Ivorian Civil War, he helped to participate in the negotiations between Togo and the Economic Community of West African States. He also participated in the Linas-Marcoussis Accords as a member of the PCDI. Additionally, he served as President of the Economic and Social Council until 19 May 2011.

Laurent Dona Fologo died in Abidjan on 5 February 2021 at the age of 81 from COVID-19.
