= James Houra =

Ivorian painter (1952–2020)

- Born: 27 March 1952; Adiaké, French West Africa
- Died: 27 January 2020 (aged 67)
- Occupation: Painter

James Houra (27 March 1952 – 27 January 2020) was an Ivorian painter.

== Biography ==
He served as director of the École des beaux arts d'Abidjan and was known for his checkerboard paintings. One of his paintings, Offrande, is on display at the Presidential Palace in Abidjan. Another one of his paintings was offered to French Minister of the Interior, Claude Guéant, by President Ouattara, and is a source of controversy due to the fact that the painting was not returned at the end of the former's term of office.

Houra's works have been valued between 2000 and 25,000 euros.

James Houra died on 27 January 2020 at the age of 67.
