= Abomé l'Éléphant =

Ivorian singer and rapper (1992–2026)

- Born: Anassin Boris Médard; 22 June 1992; Marcory, Ivory Coast
- Died: 18 May 2026 (aged 33) Treichville, Ivory Coast
- Genres: Hip-hop, Ivorian music
- Instruments: Vocals

Anassin Boris Médard (22 June 1992 – 18 May 2026), better known by the stage name Abomé l'Éléphant, was an Ivorian singer and rapper.

== Life and career ==
Médard began his musical career with the group Fiesta Parade before signing with Yôrô Gang Production, owned by DJ Arafat. He also collaborated with singer Molare on tracks such as "Tous des traîtres" and "Game 2 Dohi". His style blended elements of Ivorian rap, afrobeats, coupé-décalé, and zouglou.

Abomé l'Éléphant died from a cardiac arrest in Treichville, on 18 May 2026, at the age of 33.

== Discography ==
=== Albums ===
- Apero (2020)
- Were Were (2021)

=== Singles ===
- "Numéro 10"
- "Solo"
- "La CAN c'est chez nous"
- "Côcô"
