= Albert Kakou Tiapani =

Ivorian politician (c,1944–2021)

Minister of Housing and Urban Planning/ Minister of Construction
- In office 1993 – 24 December 1999

Personal details
- Born: c. 1944 Dabou Department, Ivory Coast, French West Africa, France
- Died: 9 September 2021 (aged 77) Abidjan, Ivory Coast
- Party: PCDI–RDA
- Spouse: Lucienne Nandjo Essoh Tiapani
- Children: 5

Albert Kakou Tiapani (c. September 27, 1944 – September 9, 2021) was an Ivorian politician. A member of the Democratic Party of Ivory Coast – African Democratic Rally, he served as Minister of Housing and Urban Planning under the second government of Daniel Kablan Duncan.
