= 2002 in Ivory Coast =

- Decades: 1980s; 1990s; 2000s; 2010s; 2020s
- See also: Other events of 2002; Timeline of Ivorian history

The following lists events that happened during 2002 in Ivory Coast.

== Incumbents ==
- President: Laurent Gbagbo
- Prime Minister: Pascal Affi N'Guessan

== Events ==
=== September ===
- September 19 - An attempted coup by disaffected former soldiers of Côte d'Ivoire was put down, with the death of the alleged coup leader, General Robert Guéï, a former military dictator of the country. Guéï was killed when his car refused to stop at a roadblock in downtown Abidjan. Rebels continue in control of the cities of Bouaké and Korhogo.
