= Séry Bailly =

Ivorian academic and politician (1948–2018)

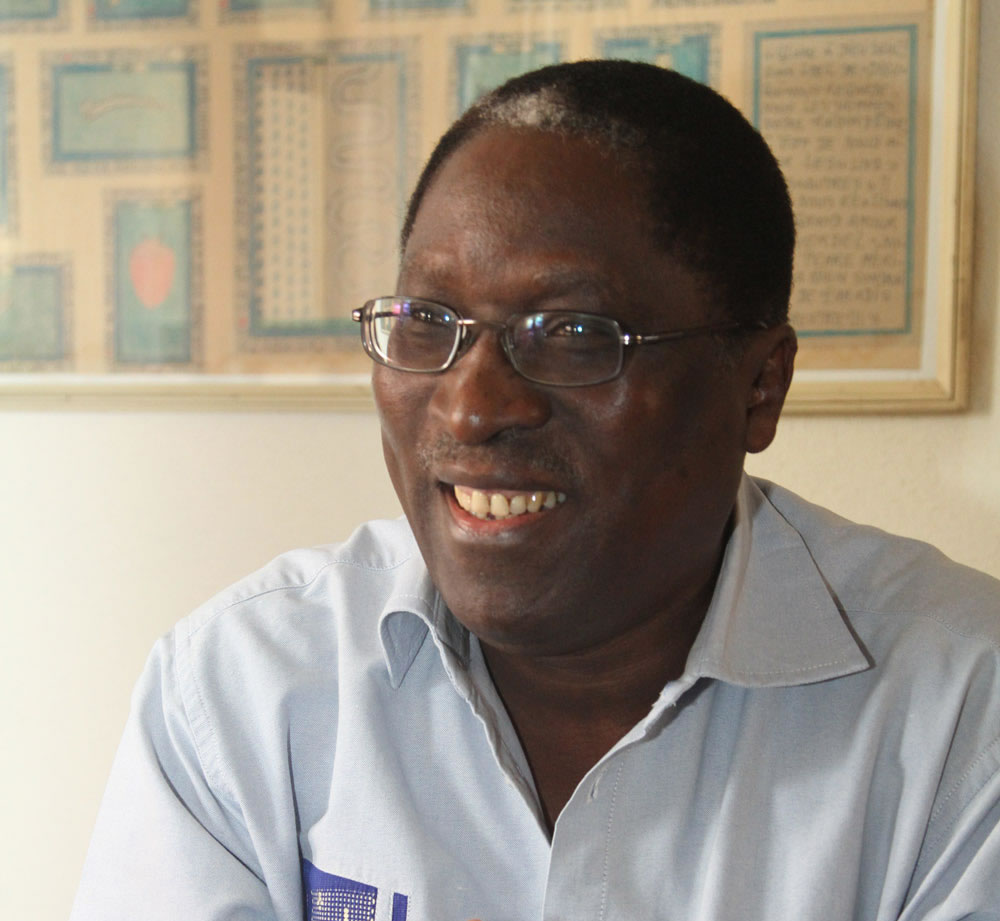
- Born: Zacharie Séry Bailly; 13 March 1948 Abidjan, French West Africa
- Died: 2 December 2018 (aged 70) Abidjan, Ivory Coast

Zacharie Séry Bailly, or Séry Bailly, (13 March 1948 – 2 December 2018) was an Ivorian academic, politician and short-story writer, born in Abidjan, Ivory Coast. Chairperson of Harris Memel-Fotê-Jean Jaurès Fondation in Abidjan, he was also vice-chairman of the Academy of sciences, arts, and cultures of Africa and the African diaspora (ASCAD).

== Biography ==
Born in Abidjan, on March 13, 1948, Bailly after his secondary and higher education embraces an academic career. He entered Abidjan-Cocody where he teaches English. He became Dean of the Faculty of Languages and Civilizations of the University of Cocody.

In 1993, he became a member of the Ivorian Popular Front (FPI) and joined the Government on 4 January 2000 as Minister of Higher Education and Scientific Research and was elected on Dec. 10, 2000, as representative for the riding of Daloa in the FPI banner. It will be reappointed as Minister of Higher Education and Scientific Research and will keep the same position in successive governments before being appointed on 5 August 2002, the Minister of Communication. Zacharie Séry Bailly leaves the Government on March 13, 2003, by giving the chair to Guillaume Soro.

He was a figure of the Ivorian left and has been revealed to the Ivorian public by his columnist activities. His "Chroniques de notre temps", published each Wednesday at the latest coverage of the Ivorian weekly newspaper "Notre Temps" (1991-1994), helps build his image of an intellectual. He depicts the Ivorian society sores with a writing style too poetic and sarcastic.

He was the author of two essays Hommage à Tiagouri Tapé "Vraiment" and Deux Guerres de transition : Guerres américaine et Guerre ivoirienne. He produced also numerous scientific publications in the field of art and civilization.

The general public discovered Séry Bailly in the early 90s but he was already known in the 70s as belonging to the protesters circles which should generate the Ivorian left. In 1971, while a student, he was arrested following a protest on campus and forcibly taken to military service. Deported from March 1971 to January 1973 in Séguéla -more than 500 kilometers from Abidjan- He will have Laurent Gbagbo as a prison life companion. Freed, he resumed studies he completed a doctoral thesis in the Department of English.

Sery Bailly integrated the National University of Côte d'Ivoire, as assistant. Having risen through the ranks of the function, he was appointed dean of the languages and civilizations faculty of the University of Cocody until 2001.

Bailly was an influential member of SYNARES, a major teachers union where he defends the interests of his corporation.

As a politician, Sery Bailly had a reputation as a man of moderate views. This attitude raised the anger of some Ivorian patriots at the outbreak of the political and military crisis in Côte d'Ivoire on 19 September 2002. Minister of Communications at the time, Bailly wiped the recriminations of his political party. Faced with the frightening machine opponents of official discourse, a segment of the population considers insufficient his actions at the head of the Ministry of Communications.

Artistically, Sery Bailly proved very critical of the Zouglou, he considered it "music of the low self-esteem".

== Notable work ==
- 1976 : Le désenchantement dans les romans des écrivains africains anglophones de la deuxième génération (A. K. Armah, K. Awoonor, W.T. Ngugi, W. Soyinka) (Université de Paris III)
- 1999 : Hommage à Tiagouri Tapé "Vraiment" (PUCI)
- 2003 : Deux guerres de transition : guerres civiles américaine et ivoirienne (EDUCI)
- 2005 : Ne pas perdre le nord (EDUCI)
- 2005 : Réflexion sur la crise ivoirienne : vivre en paix dans un Etat-nation souverain (L'Harmattan)
- 2009 : Ecrits pour la démocratie : la roue tourne (Editions du CERAP)
- 2009 : Regards culturels : que tombe la pluie diluvienne ! (PUCI)
- 2010 : Des paroles de Côte-d'Ivoire pour Haïti, notre devoir de solidarité (Ceda/Nei), Collectif.
