= Mobio Besse Henri =

Ivorian boxer (1977–2020)

Personal information
- Nickname: Sonny
- Nationality: Ivorian
- Born: 12 October 1977 Abidjan, Ivory Coast
- Died: 12 March 2020 (aged 42)
- Height: 5 ft 9 in (175 cm)
- Weight: Light-heavyweight; Cruiserweight

Boxing career

Boxing record
- Total fights: 21
- Wins: 6
- Win by KO: 4
- Losses: 14
- Draws: 1

Mobio Besse Henri (12 October 1977 – 12 March 2020) was an Ivorian professional boxer.

== Biography ==
On 10 June 2005, Henri won the African Boxing Confederation (ABC) light heavyweight title by beating Georges Akono. On 9 March 2007, Henri defeated Isaac Paakwesi Ankrah in the 11th round. He lost his ABC title on 24 October 2008 to Olubi Severin in the 3rd round.
