= Jean-Jacques Béchio =

Ivorian politician

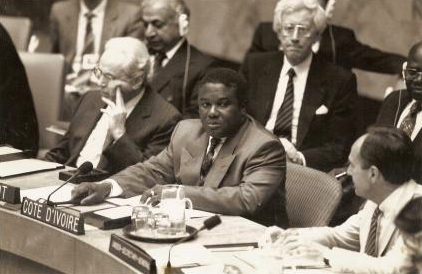
- Born: 22 August 1949; Grand-Bassam, Ivory Coast
- Died: 2 February 2018 (aged 68); Abidjan, Ivory Coast
- Occupation: Politician

Jean-Jacques Béchio (22 August 1949 – 12 February 2018) was an Ivorian politician. A member of the Attie ethnic group, he came from the student trade union milieu where he started his career.
