= 2023 in Ivory Coast =

- Decades: 2000s; 2010s; 2020s
- See also: Other events of 2023; Timeline of Ivorian history

Events in the year 2023 in Ivory Coast.

== Incumbents ==
- President: Alassane Ouattara
- Prime Minister Patrick Achi

== Events ==
Ongoing: COVID-19 pandemic in Ivory Coast

== Sports ==
- July: Ivory Coast at the 2023 World Aquatics Championships

== Deaths ==
- 10 July - Roger Gnoan M'Bala, 80, Ivorian film director
- 1st August – Henri Konan Bédié, 89, politician, president (1993–1999).

== See also ==
- COVID-19 pandemic in Africa
- African Continental Free Trade Area
- Organisation internationale de la Francophonie
