= Luc Marius Ibriga =

Burkinabé academic and jurist (1956–2022)

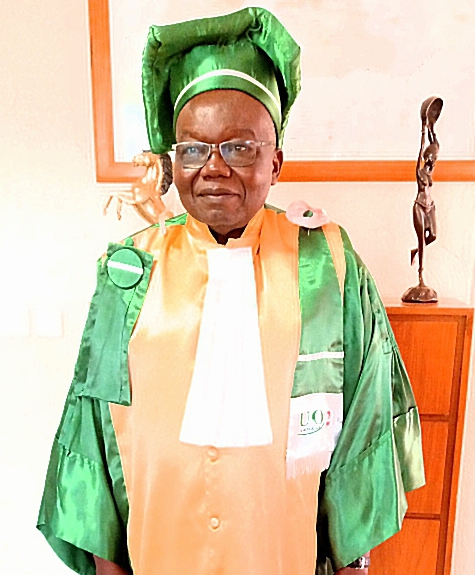
- Luc Marius at the Faculty of Law of Thomas SANKARA University
- Born: 27 September 1956; Korhogo, French Ivory Coast, French West Africa
- Died: 25 December 2022 (aged 66); Ouagadougou, Burkina Faso
- Occupations: Professor; Jurist

Luc Marius Ibriga (27 September 1956 – 25 December 2022) was a Burkinabé academic and jurist. A law professor at the University of Ouagadougou, he was president of the Autorité supérieure de contrôle de l’État.

== Biography ==
Ibriga was born in Korhogo in Ivory Coast on 27 September 1956. He then moved to Burkina Faso, his native country, where he spent his university studies. He researched and taught at the Université Ouaga II and the University of Ouagadougou and was appointed president of the Autorité supérieur de contrôle de l'État in 2015.

Luc Marius Ibriga died in Ouagadougou on 25 December 2022, at the age of 66.
