= 2025 in Ivory Coast =

- Decades: 2000s; 2010s; 2020s
- See also: Other events of 2025; Timeline of Ivorian history

Events in the year 2025 in Ivory Coast.

== Incumbents ==
- President: Alassane Ouattara
- Prime Minister Robert Beugré Mambé

== Events ==
=== January ===
- 21 January – A bus and a truck collide in Ponan-Ouinlo, killing 15 people and injuring 23 others.

=== February ===
- 20 February – The French military withdraws from its only military base in the country.

=== June ===
- 3 June – Five inmates are killed in a riot inside a prison in Bouake.
- 5 June – A cholera outbreak is declared following the deaths of seven people and 38 other infections in Vridi Akobrate, near Abidjan.
- 10 June – The European Union adds Ivory Coast to its list of high risk jurisdictions for money laundering and terrorism financing.
- 28 June – The African Court on Human and Peoples' Rights dismisses a lawsuit filed by former president Laurent Gbagbo against the Ivorian government over his disqualification from the 2025 Ivorian presidential election.

=== July ===
- 7 July – The French Senate authorizes the return of the talking drum "Djidji Ayokwe" to Ivory Coast.
- 25 July–3 August – 2025 Women's Afrobasket
- 27 July – A bus traveling from San Pedro to Burkina Faso collides with a dump truck, killing 16 people and injuring 51 others.

=== August ===
- 2–3 August – Six members of the African People's Party – Côte d'Ivoire are arrested in disputed circumstances nationwide.

=== October ===
- 11 October – Police in Abidjan use tear gas to disperse opposition protests after demonstrators defy a government ban on marches; 237 people are arrested, with 26 being sentenced to 36 months' imprisonment on 17 October.
- 14 October – Ivory Coast qualifies for the 2026 FIFA World Cup, defeating Kenya 3-0 in Abidjan to top Group F of the CAF qualifiers by one point over Gabon.
- 25 October – 2025 Ivorian presidential election: Incumbent president Alassane Ouattara is reelected to a fourth term with 89.77% of the vote.

=== December ===
- 8 December – Alassane Ouattara is inaugurated for a fourth term as president.
- 16 December – US President Donald Trump issues a proclamation imposing partial travel restrictions on Ivorian nationals travelling to the United States.
- 27 December – 2025 Ivorian parliamentary election: The ruling Rally of Houphouëtists for Democracy and Peace wins 197 of 255 seats in the National Assembly.
- 30 December – The United States and Ivory Coast sign an agreement allowing for $487 million in funding to strengthen the healthcare sector in the latter country.

== Holidays ==
- 1 January – New Year's Day
- 27 March – Day after Laylat al-Qadr
- 30 March – Korité
- 21 April – Easter Monday
- 1 May – Labour Day
- 29 May – Ascension Day
- 6 June – Tabaski
- 9 June – Whit Monday
- 7 August – Independence Day
- 15 August – Assumption Day
- 5 September – Day after the Prophet's Birthday
- 1 November – All Saints' Day
- 15 November – National Peace Day
- 25 December – Christmas Day

== Deaths ==
- 8 April – Amara Essy, 82, president of the UNGA (1994–1995), acting secretary-general of the Organization of African Unity (2001–2002) and minister of foreign affairs (1990–2000)
- 26 December – Jean-Louis Gasset, 72, French-born football manager (national team).

== See also ==
- African Continental Free Trade Area
- Organisation internationale de la Francophonie
