= DJ Congélateur =

Ivorian singer (died 2026)

- Born: Koffi Kouakou Elias; 1993; Ivory Coast
- Died: 21 May 2026 (aged 33); Abidjan, Ivory Coast
- Occupation: Singer

Koffi Kouakou Elias (1993 – 21 May 2026), better known by the stage name DJ Congélateur, was an Ivorian singer.

Also a coupé-décalé artist, he went viral on social media in the 2020s for his videos combining music with humor.

== Life and career ==
Born in Ivory Coast, Elias grew up under difficult conditions before beginning a television career with Radiodiffusion Television Ivoirienne, NCI, and La 3. However, he gained most of his popularity on the internet from his humoristic videos. He then entered the music scene, releasing tracks such as "Cailloux dans ton Zoreille" and "Grâce à Dieu, je vais avancer". In January 2023, he publicly announced a split with his manager Manadja Confirmé over a pay dispute. He also alleged mistreatment and difficulties with their professional relationship.

DJ Congélateur died in Abidjan on 21 May 2026, after he had been in a coma for several weeks.
