= Léopoldine Tiézan Coffie =

Ivorian politician (1950–2026)

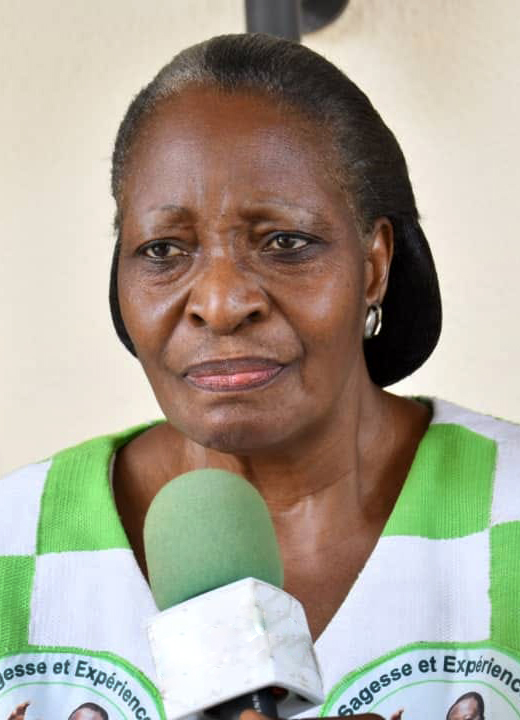
- Tiézan in 2025

Minister of Family and Women's Promotion
- In office 11 August 1998 – 24 December 1999
- Prime Minister: Daniel Kablan Duncan
- Preceded by: Position established
- Succeeded by: Position abolished

Personal details
- Born: 1950
- Died: 7 February 2026 (aged 75) Abidjan, Ivory Coast
- Party: PDCI-RDA

Léopoldine Tiézan Coffie (1950 – 7 February 2026) was an Ivorian politician of the Democratic Party of Ivory Coast – African Democratic Rally (PDCI-RDA).

== Life and career ==
Born in 1950, Tiézan became an influential female figure in Ivorian politics, serving as president of the PDCI-RDA's women's wing. From 1998 to 1999, she was Minister of Family and Women's Promotion under Prime Minister Daniel Kablan Duncan from 1998 to 1999. In 2013, she was named departmental delegate of PDCI-RDA for Daloa. In November 2019, she was named the party's vice-president. She was also president of the Réseau internationale des femmes pour des actions affirmatives.

Tiézan Coffie died from a cardiac arrest in Abidjan, on 7 February 2026, at the age of 75.

== See also ==
- Democratic Party of Ivory Coast – African Democratic Rally
- Daniel Kablan Duncan
- Daloa
