= Franck Abd-Bakar Fanny =

Ivorian photographer (1970–2021)

Franck Abd-Bakar Fanny (December 21, 1970 – July 3, 2021) was an Ivorian photographer, network engineer and entrepreneur.

== Career ==
Franck Fanny decided to take up photography in 2001 after a vacation to Jamaica, where his casual photographs caught the eye of many popular artists in France who were friends of his. He is entirely self taught.

In 2013 Fanny was one of four artists selected to represent the Ivory Coast at the 55th Venice Biennale.

In 2014 he was included in the exhibition The Divine Comedy: Heaven, Purgatory, and Hell Revisited by Contemporary African Artists, which toured to the SCAD Museum of Art in Savannah, Georgia, and the Smithsonian's National Museum of African Art, Washington, D.C.. In 2018 he received the Prix de l'Uemoa at the 13th Dak'Art festival.

== Death ==
He died July 2, 2021, in Abidjan.
