= 2006 in Ivory Coast =

- Decades: 1980s; 1990s; 2000s; 2010s; 2020s
- See also: Other events of 2006; Timeline of Ivorian history

The following lists events that happened during 2006 in Ivory Coast.

== Incumbents ==
- President: Laurent Gbagbo
- Prime Minister: Charles Konan Banny

== Events ==
=== January ===
- January 17 - Supporters of President Laurent Gbagbo attack United Nations peacekeepers after the Ivorian Popular Front withdraws from the Ivorian Civil War peace process.
- January 18 - Fighting is being reported between Bangladeshi UN peacekeepers and supporters of Laurent Gbagbo's "Young Patriots" in Côte d'Ivoire. At least three people have been killed, and the UN has warned that the country is sliding towards war.

=== February ===
- February 7–11 people were killed when unidentified assailants attacked a village in the volatile western region of Côte d'Ivoire, 20 km from the town of Guiglo which has seen a series of deadly ethnically motivated clashes in 2005 and violent anti-UN protests in January 2006.
