= Bernard Dadié national grand prize for literature =

- Sponsored by: Ivorian Ministry of Culture and Francophonie
- Country: Côte d'Ivoire
- Presented by: Akwaba Culture
- Reward: 1 million CFA
- First award: 2014

The Bernard Dadié National Grand Prize for Literature is an Ivorian literary award established in 2014 by the Ministry of Culture and Francophonie in Côte d'Ivoire. It is open only to individual works. The prize was created to encourage literary talents while promoting a culture of reading in Côte d'Ivoire. The winner is presented with a trophy and one million CFA francs (approximately $1,700) at the annual Salon international du livre d'Abidjan (SILA).

== Organization ==
The administration of the prize is overseen by Akwaba Culture, an Ivorian non-profit dedicated to promoting African literature. It also oversees the Prix Ivoire for the African Literature of Francophone Expression, a prize open to all writers in Africa whose submitted work has been published in the French language.

== Evolution ==
Initially named National Grand Prix of Literature, it was renamed Bernard Dadié National Grand Prize for Literature in honor of the eponymous Ivorian writer.

== List of winners ==
- 2014: Charles Nokan for Tel que je suis (As I am)
- 2016: Véronique Tadjo for Nelson Mandela : non à l’apartheid (Nelson Mandela: no to apartheid)
- 2017: Josué Guébo for Aux chemins de Babo Naki (Babo Naki's Paths)
- 2018 : Serge Bilé for Boni
- 2019 : Gauz for Camarade Papa
- 2022 : Tiburce Koffi for L'Itinérant
- 2024 : Macaire Etty for Flamme éternelle
- 2025 : Fidèle Goulyzia for Malo Woussou
