= Guy Emmanuel Alain Gauze =

Ivorian politician (1952–2021)

Ambassador of Ivory Coast to the European Union
- In office 2000–2002

Minister of Raw Materials
- In office 1993–1998

Minister of Foreign Trade
- In office 1998–2000

Personal details
- Born: 3 May 1952 Ferkessédougou, French West Africa
- Died: 27 January 2021 (aged 68) Geneva, Switzerland
- Party: PCDI-RDA

Guy Emmanuel Alain Gauze (3 May 1952 – 27 January 2021) was an Ivorian politician and diplomat.

== Biography ==
After he graduated from the University of Abidjan, Gauze studied diplomacy and international economics at the École nationale d'administration from 1976 to 1978. He then earned a degree in political science from the Université catholique de Louvain in Belgium.

In 1993, Gauze was appointed Minister of Raw Materials under the presidency of Félix Houphouët-Boigny, then Henri Konan Bédié. In 1998, he was appointed Minister of Foreign Trade, then Ambassador of Ivory Coast to the European Union, where he served from 2000 to 2002. He was then a representative to the United Nations and World Trade Organization from 2006 to 2011.

Aside from his political life, Gauze was married on 21 February 1981 and had three children. He died in Geneva on 27 January 2021 at the age of 68.

== Distinctions ==
- Commander of the Ordre du Mérite agricole ivoirien (1998)
- Commander of the National Order of the Ivory Coast (2000)
- Commander of the Order of Ivory Merit (2002)
