= Alphonse Douati =

Ivorian politician (1955–2022)

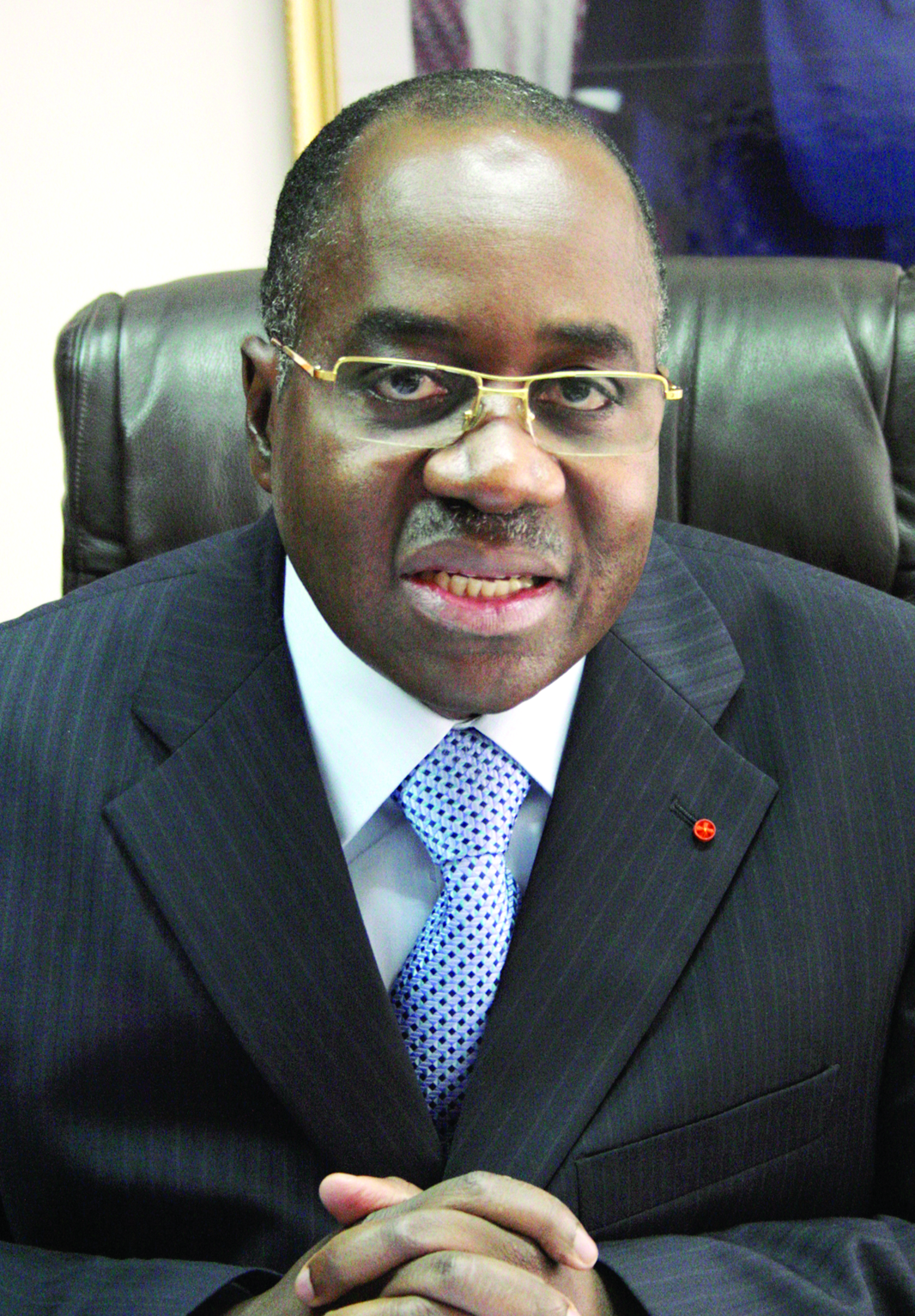
Image of Alphonse Douati

Alphonse Douati (1955 – 30 January 2022) was an Ivorian politician who served as a Minister in the cabinet of Laurent Gbagbo. He was born in French Ivory Coast, French West Africa, France, in 1955.

Douati died on 30 January 2022, at the age of 67.
