= 2017 in Ivory Coast =

- Decades: 1990s; 2000s; 2010s; 2020s
- See also: Other events of 2017; Timeline of Ivorian history

This article lists events from the year 2017 in the Ivory Coast.

== Incumbents ==
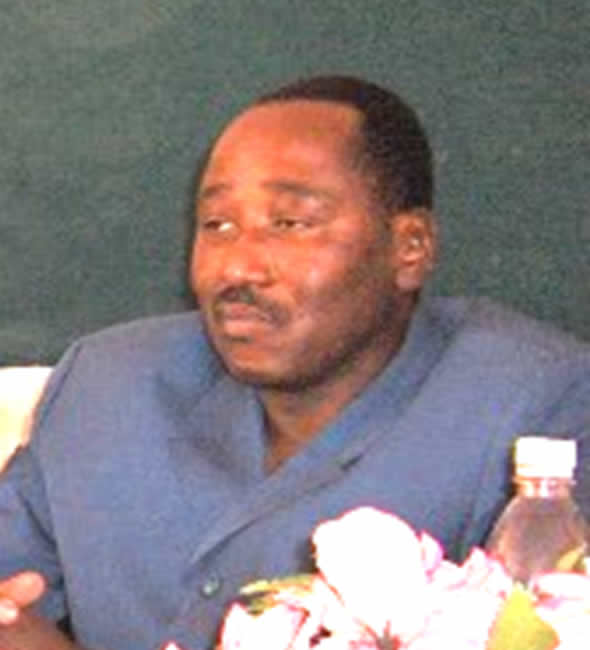
Amadou Gon Coulibaly, new prime minister from 10 January

- President: Alassane Ouattara
- Vice President: Daniel Kablan Duncan (from January 16) (Note: Vice President position was established January 16)
- Prime Minister: Daniel Kablan Duncan (until January 10); Amadou Gon Coulibaly (from January 10)

== Events ==
=== January ===
- 6-8 January - A major mutiny broke out among the army of Ivory Coast.
- 6 January - Soldiers seized control of the Ivory Coast's second biggest city Bouaké.
- 10 January - Amadou Gon Coulibaly took over as the new prime minister.
- 16 January - Daniel Kablan Duncan becomes the first Vice President of the Ivory Coast per result of the referendum in where voters approved the 2016 Constitution of the Ivory Coast

=== May ===
- 12 May - Soldiers mutiny against the government again over a pay dispute by blocking access to Ivory Coast's second largest city, Bouaké.

=== Sport ===
- Football season: The 2016–17 Ligue 1 comprises 14 teams

== Deaths ==
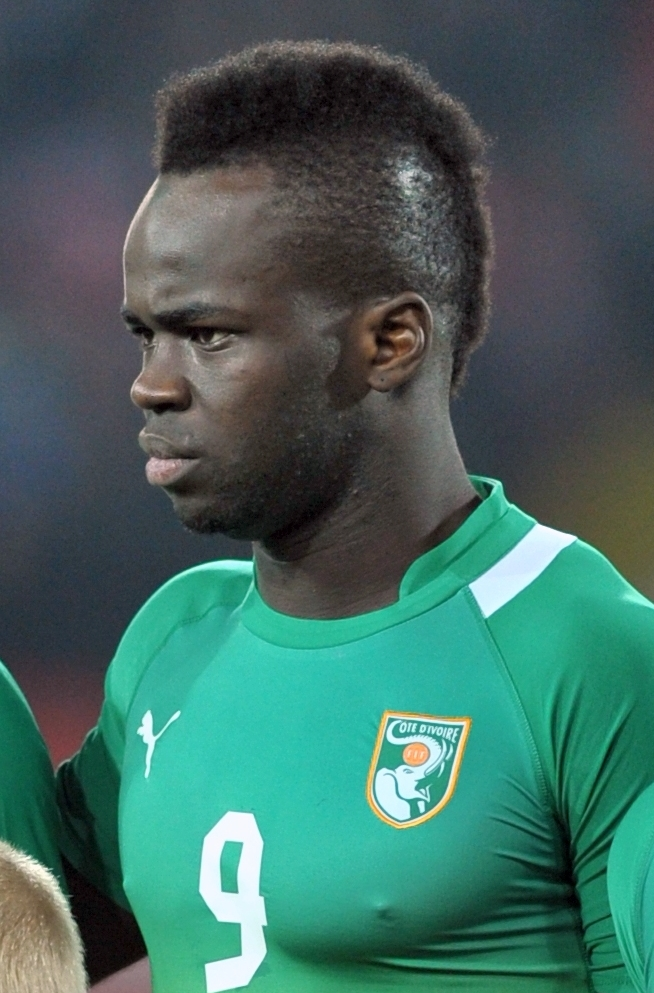
Cheick Tioté

- 5 June – Cheick Tioté, footballer (b. 1986)

== Links ==
Media related to 2017 in Ivory Coast at Wikimedia Commons
