= Think of Lampedusa =

Poem

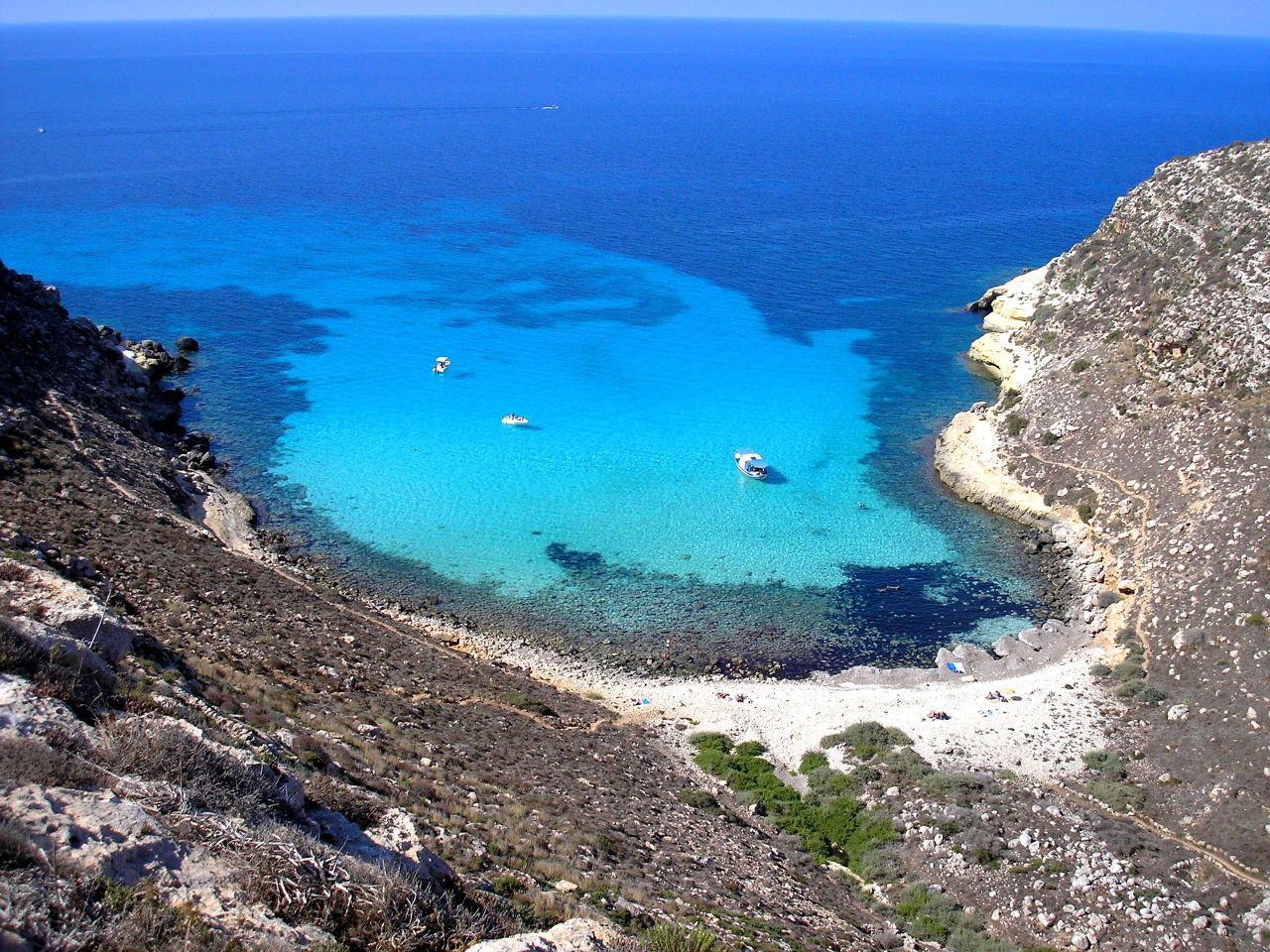
- The island of Lampedusa
- Author: Josué Guébo
- Original title: Songe à Lampedusa
- Translator: Todd Fredson
- Language: French, English
- Series: African poetry book
- Genre: Poetry
- Publisher: University of Nebraska
- Publication date: 2014
- Publication place: Ivory Coast
- English publication date: 2017
- Pages: 90
- ISBN: 9781496200426
- Preceded by: My country, tonight
- Followed by: L'ombre du pont

Think of Lampedusa is a collection of serial poems by Josué Guébo, published in French in 2014, translated in English in 2017 by Todd Fredson with an introduction by John Keene. The book received the Tchicaya U Tam'si Prize for African Poetry in 2014.

== Theme ==
The main theme of Think of Lampedusa refers to the 2013 shipwreck of some 500 African migrants near the Italian island of Lampedusa, that killed 366 persons. The book deals, on this basis, with the massive emigration of African youth to Europe. It describes the reasons for emigration, the conditions under which journeys are made and the often dramatic consequences of these adventures. The poet, using both mythological and historical elements, questions in this work complex realities about the nature of man and his identity.

== Summary ==
Think of Lampedusa is the story of hundreds of young people, of various religions, who leave from Libya, Somalia, Eritrea or Mali towards Europe and most of whom perish during the crossing. Those who escape the depths of the ocean and reach the island of Lampedusa, will face the electric fence of hate.

It is also, through time and space, a rewrite with a touch of irony, the Iliad as well as the Odyssey and in a general way, the myth of Ulysses.

== Style ==
Think of Lampedusa is a collection of poems that presents itself as a single text. The work appears as a verse for a story and therefore holds both poetry and narration. It uses in places, anaphora and allegories.

The author presents memories but also expectations through a hike that leads him through sea, dream, raft, anxiety and sinking.

== Literary prize ==
- Tchicaya U Tam'si Prize for African Poetry, 2014.

== Publication ==
- Songe à Lampedusa, Silex/Nouvelles du Sud, 2014 ISBN 9782912717702
- Songe à Lampedusa, Fondation du forum d'Assilah, 2014 ISBN 978-9954-33-943-5
- Think of Lampedusa, African Poetry Book, 2017 ISBN 9781496200426
