= Académie des sciences, des arts, des cultures d'Afrique et des diasporas africaines =

African cultural institution

- Abbreviation: ASCAD
- Formation: 2003; 23 years ago
- Type: National academy
- Headquarters: Abidjan, Côte d'Ivoire
- President: Antoine Hauhouot Asseypo
- Website: ascad.ci

The Académie des sciences, des arts, des cultures d'Afrique et des diasporas africaines (ASCAD), created on 1 September 2003 in Abidjan, Côte d'Ivoire, is an African cultural institution whose objective is to contribute to the development and influence of science, arts, African culture and that of the African diaspora. It is also aimed at economic growth and social progress. Its members include scientists, philosophers, writers, artists and inventors.

The ASCAD has assumed the membership of the Fédération des Associations Scientfiiques de Côte d'Ivoire, a predecessor body Associate of International Council for Science (ICSU) since 1992.

== Organisation ==
The ASCAD is divided into several fields, each with a secretary: exact sciences, natural science, social science, legal science and art. It is, administratively, attached to the Ivorian Presidency.

== Research Prize and scholarships ==
Since 2011, ASCAD has been running a contest each year, with the winner receiving the "ASCAD Award of Excellence for Research" with a cash prize.

In 2013, the first edition of the ASCAD Research Scholarships was launched. These scholarships are intended for those of scientific, cultural or artistic activities on national strategic interest.

== Successive presidents ==
- Harris Memel-Fotê, from August 19, 2004 to May 11, 2008;
- Barthélémy Kotchy, former Vice President, President from December 11, 2008 to June 2015;
- Aïdara Daouda, from June 2015 to June 2018;
- Antoine Hauhouot Asseypo, since June 2018.
