= Zakpa Komenan =

Ivorian politician (1945–2021)

Zakpa Komenan (1945 – May 19, 2021) was an Ivorian politician who served as Minister of Education.
