= René Aphing Kouassi =

Ivorian politician and magistrate (1948–2026)

- Ahping in 2018

Minister of Defence
- In office 28 December 2005 – 29 March 2007
- President: Laurent Gbagbo
- Prime Minister: Charles Konan Banny
- Preceded by: René Amani
- Succeeded by: Michel Amani N'Guessan

President of the Supreme Court
- In office February 2015 – April 2020
- President: Alassane Ouattara

Personal details
- Born: 2 July 1948 Abidjan, French Ivory Coast, French West Africa
- Died: 15 September 2026 (aged 78)
- Party: PDCI-RDA
- Education: National University of Ivory Coast; French National School for the Judiciary
- Occupation: Magistrate

René Aphing Kouassi (2 July 1948 – 15 September 2026) was an Ivorian politician of the Democratic Party of Ivory Coast – African Democratic Rally (PDCI-RDA) and magistrate.

Aphing was a graduate of the National University of Ivory Coast and the French National School for the Judiciary. He served as Minister of Defence from 2005 to 2007. He then served as president of the Supreme Court from 2015 to 2020 until a new constitution was drafted.

Aphing died on 15 September 2026, at the age of 78.
