= Lambert Amon Tanoh =

Ivorian politician (1926–2022)

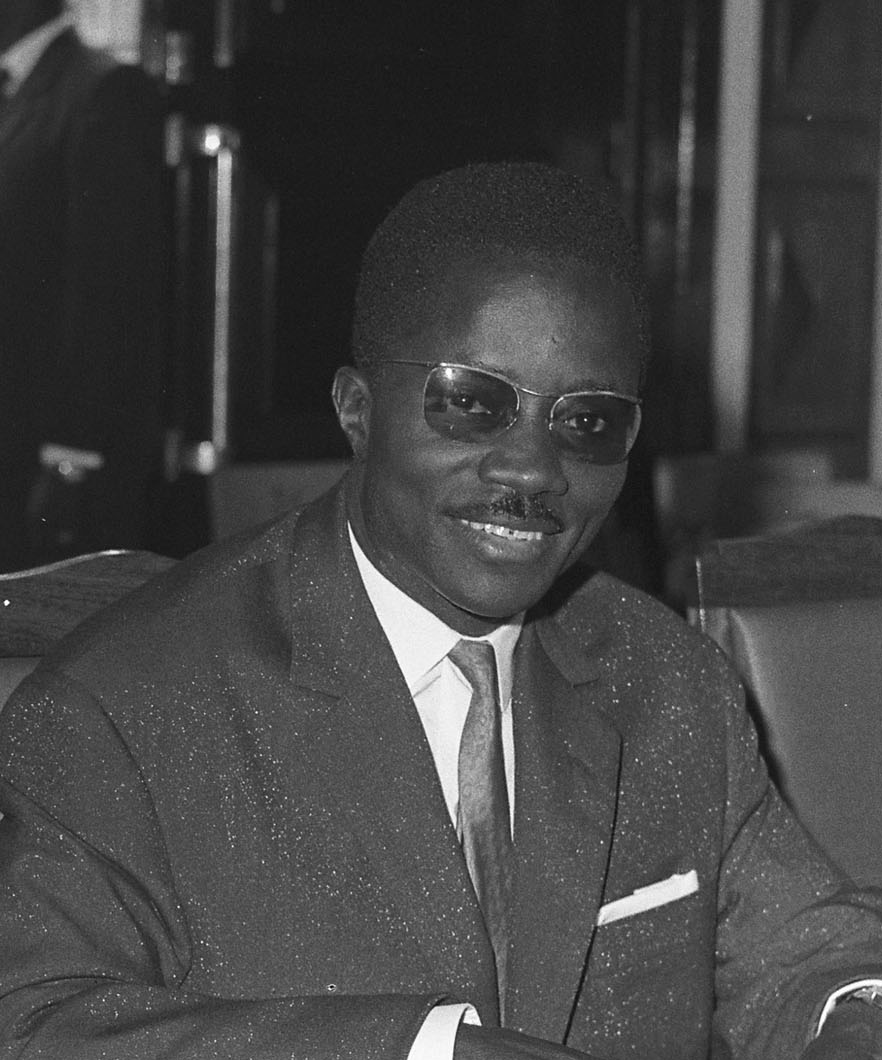
Tanoh in 1963

Lambert Amon Tanoh (14 November 1926 – 13 January 2022) was an Ivorian teacher, labor leader, and politician who served as the ambassador to Algeria.

== Biography ==
Born in French Ivory Coast, French West Africa, France, Tanoh formed his first political party in 1944 with a group of young planters. He studied at a teacher's college in Katibougou Teacher's College in Mali. His teaching career began at a Bingerville school for boys. In 1959 he became Secretary General of the labor union Union des Travailleurs de Côte d'Ivoire. The Ivory Coast government wanted labor unions to be under local control, so Tanoh led the breakaway movement, the Union Nationale des Travailleurs de Côte d'Ivoire.

He subsequently became an executive member of the Parti démocratique de Côte d'Ivoire. and was elected to the National Assembly. He became Minister of Education in Côte d'Ivoire in 1963 under President Félix Houphouët-Boigny, a position held until 1970. In 1983 he was appointed the Ivory Coast ambassador to Algeria.

Tanoh died from COVID-19 on 13 January 2022, at the age of 95.

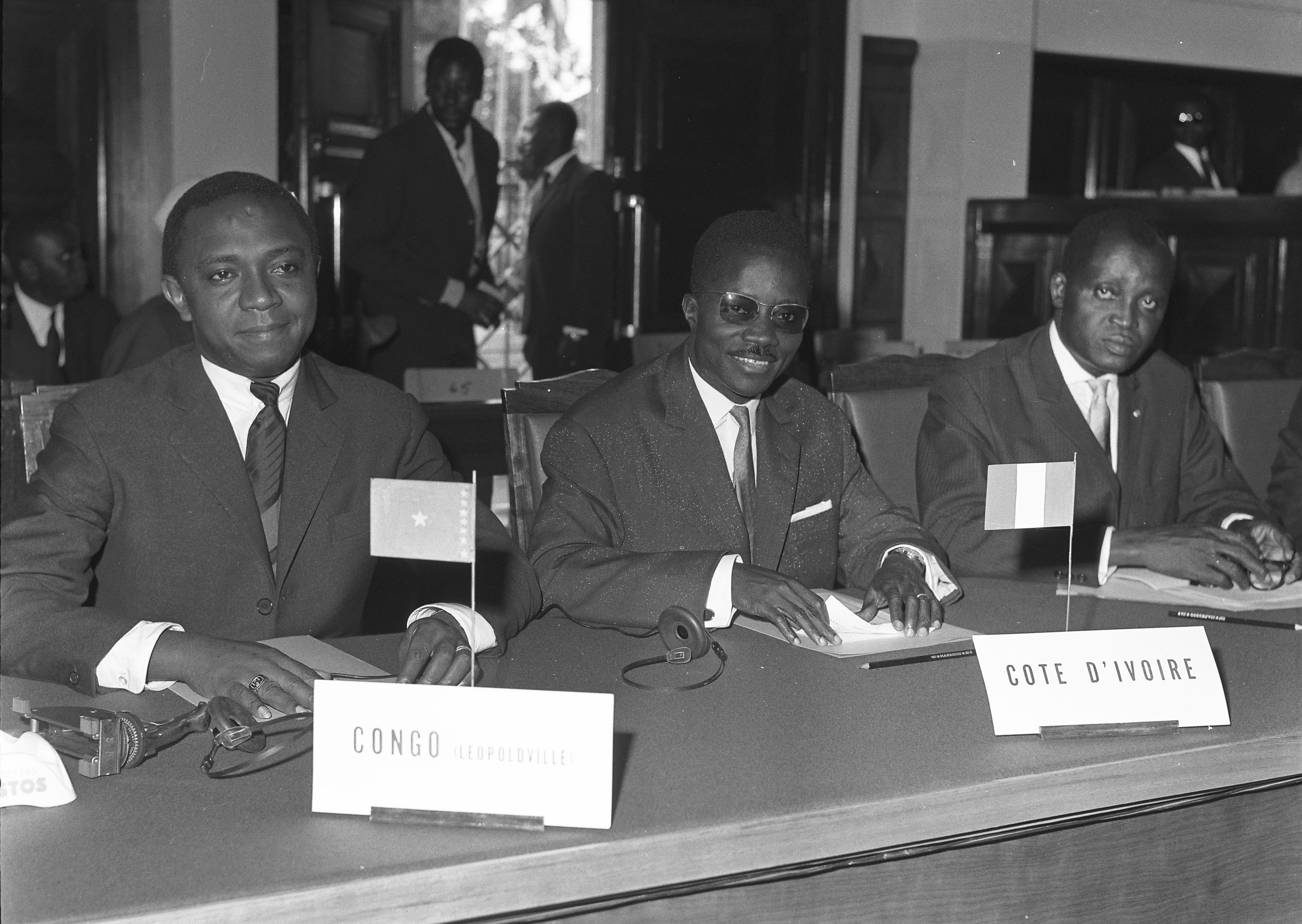
Tanoh (center) at signing of the Yaoundé I Convention, 1963
