= Treichville University Hospital =

Hospital in Ivory Coast

The Treichville University Hospital is a hospital in Abidjan, Ivory Coast. The facility was built in 1938 to be an annex hospital of the nearby Plateau Central Hospital. In 1976 the facility acquired the status of university hospital center (CHU). The hospital is built on an area of 42 hectares and has a capacity of 658 beds.

The hospital is responsible for providing emergency care, diagnostic tests, consultations and treatment of patients.

The hospital provides training not only with Cocody and Yopougon university hospitals in postgraduate medical education but also in pharmaceutical, dental/dental education and paramedicine. The CHU Treichville remains in addition, a center for medical, pharmaceutical and dental research.

However, the facility faces very serious health problems, insalubrity, and lack of means and maintenance of equipment and the premises. The hospital suffers from a lack of medical staff and a largely insufficient budget.
