= 2024 in Ivory Coast =

- Decades: 2000s; 2010s; 2020s
- See also: Other events of 2024; Timeline of Ivorian history

Events in the year 2024 in Ivory Coast.

== Events ==
- January 13-February 11: The 2023 Africa Cup of Nations is hosted in the country, with the home team winning 2-1 against Nigeria in the final held in Abidjan.
- June 25: At least 24 people are reported killed following days of heavy rains and floods in Abidjan.
- August 20: The Ivory Coast reports 21 new cases of mpox as well as the country's first death from mpox.
- September 6: A tanker truck collides with a bus between Bouake and Korhogo, causing a fire that kills 13 people and injures 44.
- October 17: The government bans all student unions in the country following the deaths of two people believed to be connected with the Student Federation of Ivory Coast (FESCI) and the discovery of weapons caches and "illegal businesses" within the student housing facilities of the University of Abidjan.
- November 10: At least 21 people are killed and ten others are injured in an unspecified road accident on a highway between Soubré and Gagnoa.
- December 6: Two minibuses collide and catch fire in Brokoua, killing 26 people and injuring 28 others.
- December 31: President Alassane Ouattara announces that French troops would leave the country.

== Incumbents ==
- President: Alassane Ouattara
- Prime Minister Robert Beugré Mambé

== Holidays ==
- 1 January - New Year's Day
- 1 April - Easter Monday
- 7 April - Day after Lailatou-Kadr
- 10 April – Korité
- 1 May - Labour Day
- 9 May - Ascension Day
- 20 May - Whit Monday
- 17 June – Tabaski
- 7 August - Independence Day
- 15 August - Assumption Day
- 15 September – Day after The Prophet's Birthday
- 1 November - All Saints' Day
- 15 November - National Peace Day
- 25 December - Christmas Day

== See also ==
- African Continental Free Trade Area
- Organisation internationale de la Francophonie
