= COVID-19 pandemic in Ivory Coast =

Ongoing COVID-19 viral pandemic in Cotê d'Ivorie

- Disease: COVID-19
- Pathogen: SARS-CoV-2
- Location: Ivory Coast
- First outbreak: Wuhan, China
- Index case: Abidjan
- Arrival date: 11 March 2020 (6 years, 7 months, 2 weeks and 3 days)
- Confirmed cases: 88,434 (updated 18 September 2026)
- Deaths: 835 (updated 18 September 2026)

The COVID-19 pandemic in Ivory Coast was a part of the worldwide pandemic of coronavirus disease 2019 (COVID-19) caused by severe acute respiratory syndrome coronavirus 2 (SARS-CoV-2). The virus was confirmed to have reached Ivory Coast in March 2020.

== Background ==
On 12 January 2020, the World Health Organization (WHO) confirmed that a novel coronavirus was the cause of a respiratory illness in a cluster of people in Wuhan, Hubei, China, which was reported to the WHO on 31 December 2019.

The case fatality ratio for COVID-19 has been much lower than SARS of 2003, but the transmission has been significantly greater, with a significant total death toll.

Côte d'Ivoire's census, planned for April 2020, may be delayed, given government containment and restrictions on internal travel. Tablets from China were delayed beyond the expected delivery in January.

== Timeline ==
=== 2020 ===
On 11 March, Ivory Coast recorded its first case of COVID-19 with an Ivorian returning from Italy. The patient was being treated at the Treichville University Hospital in Abidjan and recovered five days later. Several people who were in contact with the infected person have been identified and are subject to a "follow-up", as according to the Minister of Health. The public has been assured to "keep calm" and "respect preventive measures being enforced". A free emergency number has been set up in the Ivory Coast (143 or 101) to alert people of suspected cases. Several border controls have also been set up to try to limit the spread.

On 12 March, the individual who tested positive the day before also infected his wife. As a result, the total number of cases rose to 2.

On 27 March, 5 new cases were confirmed bringing the total over the 100 benchmark with a total of 101 cases along with 2 patients recovering thus bringing the total of recovered to 3. A 58-year-old female patient with diabetes, in a coma since 25 March, became the first fatality.

On 23 April, the total number of confirmed cases crossed 1000, rising to 1,004, up by 52 from the day before, while the number of recovered patients rose to 359.

On 3 July, there were 252 new cases and 66 recoveries, bringing the total number of confirmed cases over 10,000 to 10,244 and the total number of recovered patients to 4,726. The death toll rose to 70. On 30 July, the death toll rose to 100. The National Security Council decided to extend the state of emergency until the end of August but to allow bars, nightclubs, cinemas and other entertainment venues to restart operations from 31 July 2020 as long as social distancing is maintained.

Model-based simulations for Côte d'Ivoire point to a 95% confidence interval for the time-varying reproduction number R_{t} which exceeded 1.0 from November 2020 to January 2021.

At the end of the year there had been 22,490 confirmed cases, 21,934 recoveries and 137 deaths. Modelling by WHO's Regional Office for Africa suggests that due to under-reporting, the true number of infections in 2020 was around 6.5 million while the true number of COVID-19 deaths in 2020 was around 925.

=== 2021 ===
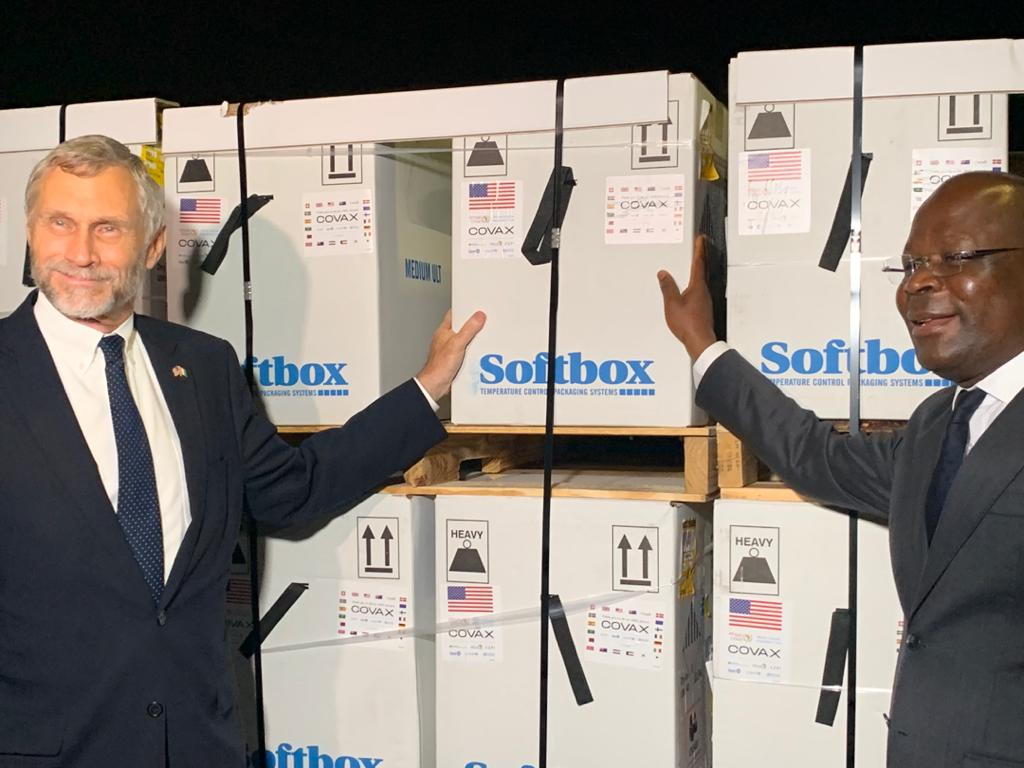
The US delivers Pfizer–BioNTech COVID-19 vaccines to Côte d'Ivoire as part of the COVAX initiative in 2021

On 6 January, through the COVAX pillar, the government ordered 200,000 doses of the Pfizer–BioNTech COVID-19 vaccine, with a view to commencing mass vaccination on 15 February 2021. Mass vaccination started on 1 March, initially with 504,000 doses of AstraZeneca's Covishield vaccine provided through COVAX and 50,000 doses donated by India.

On 30 July there were 93 new cases, taking the total number of confirmed cases to 50,004.

Model-based simulations for Côte d'Ivoire point to a 95% confidence interval for the time-varying reproduction number R_{t} above 1 during the second half of 2021.

There were 48,514 confirmed cases, 40064 recoveries and 577 deaths in 2021. At the end of the year there had been 71004 confirmed cases, 61,998 recoveries and 714 deaths. By the end of 2021, 20% of the targeted population had been fully vaccinated against COVID-19.

Modelling by WHO's Regional Office for Africa suggests that due to under-reporting, the true cumulative number of infections by the end of 2021 was around 11.8 million while the true number of COVID-19 deaths was around 4953.

=== 2022 ===
The presence of the omicron variant was confirmed on 4 January.

There were 16,937 confirmed cases, 25101 recoveries and 117 deaths in 2022. By the end of the year there had been 87,941 confirmed cases, 87,099 recoveries and 831 deaths.

=== 2023 ===
There were 443 confirmed cases and 4 deaths in 2023. By the end of the year there had been 88,384 confirmed cases and 835 deaths.

== Statistics ==
=== Charts ===
Confirmed new cases per day

View source data.

Confirmed deaths per day

View source data.

== See also ==
- COVID-19 pandemic in Africa
- COVID-19 pandemic by country and territory
- Impact of the COVID-19 pandemic on aviation
- Impact of the COVID-19 pandemic on cinema
- Impact of the COVID-19 pandemic on education
- Impact of the COVID-19 pandemic on religion
- Impact of the COVID-19 pandemic on politics
- Impact of the COVID-19 pandemic on sports
- Impact of the COVID-19 pandemic on television
- Impact of the COVID-19 pandemic on tourism
