= 2002 Ivorian coup attempt =

- Part of the First Ivorian Civil War
Date	September 19, 2002
Location	Ivory Coast
Result	Start of the First Ivorian Civil War: Rebel failure to overthrow the Gbagbo government; Rebel insurgency in Northern Ivory Coast

Belligerents
Armed Forces of the Republic of Ivory Coast	(Ivory Coast) Dissenting faction of the armed forces

Commanders and leaders
(Ivory Coast) Laurent Gbagbo	(Ivory Coast) Ibrahim Coulibaly

The 2002 Ivorian coup attempt was a failed coup d'état in the Ivory Coast against Laurent Gbagbo's government by dissident factions within the Ivorian military that plunged the country into a multiyear-long civil war which tore it into two: the rebel-held North and the government-controlled South. Motives for the coup attempt include frustrations regarding the demobilizing of soldiers instated during General Robert Guei's rule and known for their loyalty towards him. While many of them left as ordered, they refused to hand in their weapons, apparently stashing them for the upcoming coup attempt.

Involving as many as 800 soldiers, the coup attempt started on the night of 19 September 2002, with rebel forces staging attacks on three cities - Abidjan, Bouaké, and Korhogo - and managing to seize control of Bouaké and Korhogo while being repelled by government forces in Abidjan. During the day-long battle in Abidjan, General Robert Guei along with much of his family was killed by government forces under the mistaken belief he was the one who orchestrated the coup. The rebel forces later clarified they had no political connections with the general. The rebels also killed Interior Minister Émile Boga Doudou, and attacked the home of Moïse Lida Kouassi. The villa of Alassane Ouattara was burnt, and he fled to the French embassy in Abidjan for refuge.

Failing to take control, the rebel forces retreated to the predominantly Muslim North where they managed to garner widespread support among the local populace. The north, inhabited by immigrants from neighboring countries, were seen as foreigners and used as scapegoats for the country's problems, causing a sense of marginalization and lack of representation from the southern-based government. Naming themselves the Patriotic Movement of Ivory Coast (PMCI), the rebels' stated goals were to capture Abidjan, overthrow the government, and organize new elections. Meanwhile, along the Liberian border, new rebel groups - named the Ivorian Popular Movement of the Great West (MPIGO) and Movement for Justice and Peace (MPJ) - staged attacks and captured the cities of Man and Danane, claiming to fight against Laurent Gbagbo's government in order to avenge General Robert Guei's death. By December 2002, the MPIGO and MPJ merged with the MPCI, forming the New Forces.

Early mediation efforts following the rebellion's beginning brokered ceasefire agreements, but these often broke down due to mutual mistrust between the two sides, leading to continued fighting. The 2003 Linas-Marcoussis Accord, facilitated by France, aimed to establish a power-sharing government and disarm the rebel forces. Implementation however was slow and incomplete, resulting in intermittent fighting. A comprehensive settlement was finally made in 2007 with the Ouagadougou Peace Agreement which formally ended the civil war.
