= United Nations Security Council Resolution 1708 =

UN Security Council Resolution 1708
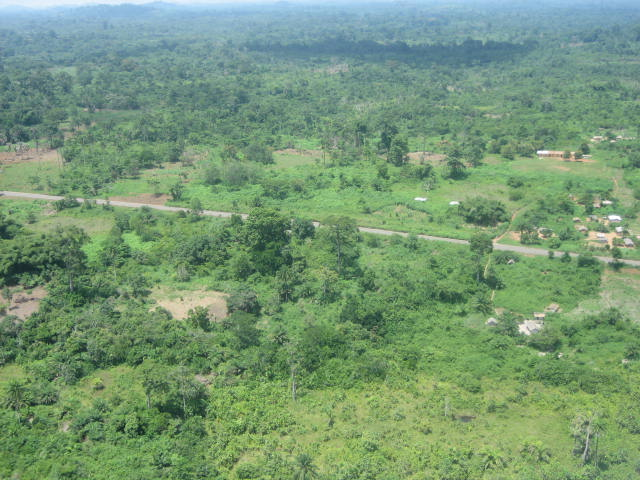
- Ivorian forest
- Date: 14 September 2006
- Meeting no.: 5,524
- Code: S/RES/1708 (Document)
- Subject: The situation in Côte d'Ivoire
- Voting summary: 15 voted for; None voted against; None abstained
- Result: Adopted

Security Council composition
- Permanent members: China; France; Russia; United Kingdom; United States
- Non-permanent members: Argentina; Rep. of the Congo; Denmark; Ghana; Greece; Japan; Peru; Qatar; Slovakia; Tanzania

United Nations Security Council Resolution 1708, adopted unanimously on September 14, 2006, after recalling previous resolutions on the situation in Côte d'Ivoire (Ivory Coast), particularly resolutions 1572 (2004), 1584 (2004), 1633 (2005) and 1643 (2005), the Council prolonged the mandate of an expert group monitoring an arms embargo against the country until mid-December 2006.

== Details ==
The Security Council welcomed the efforts of the Secretary-General Kofi Annan, the African Union and the Economic Community of West African States (ECOWAS) towards re-establishing peace and stability in Côte d'Ivoire. It determined that the situation in the country continued to pose a threat to international peace and security.

Under Chapter VII of the United Nations Charter, the mandate of the expert group monitoring sanctions was renewed until December 15, 2006. The expert group was required to submit an update on the implementation of resolutions 1572 and 1643 and make appropriate recommendations.

== See also ==
- First Ivorian Civil War
- List of United Nations Security Council Resolutions 1701 to 1800 (2006–2008)
- Opération Licorne
- United Nations Operation in Côte d'Ivoire
