= Linas-Marcoussis Agreement =

Agreement in Ivory Coast

The Linas-Marcoussis Agreement or Kléber Agreement aimed to end the First Ivorian Civil War that broke out in September 2002. The agreement was negotiated between January 15 and 26, 2003, in Linas and Marcoussis, France.

== Parties ==
French mediators under Pierre Mazeaud at the request of French president Jacques Chirac helped negotiate between several Ivorian political parties. Representatives of the Ivorian Popular Front (PFI), Union for Citizen Democracy (UPCD), Movement for Justice and Peace (MJP), Patriotic Movement of Côte d'Ivoire (MPCI), Ivorian Popular Movement of the Great West (MBIGO), Democratic Party of Ivory Coast – African Democratic Rally (PDCI-RDA), Ivorian Workers' Party (PIT), Rally of the Republicans (RDR), Movement of the Forces of the Future (MFA), and the Union for Democracy and Peace in Ivory Coast (UPDCI) were present. Other mediators included Kéba Mbaye, former Ivorian prime minister Seydou Diarra, UN, African Union, and ECOWAS representatives.

== Content ==
The agreement provided for measures of two different kinds: reforms implemented by Ivorian authorities "as soon as possible", and an immediate distribution of powers as delineated in the Constitution. The reforms to be carried out included conditions for presidential eligibility in the Constitution, the application of the December 23, 1988 law regarding rural land, a restructuring of the Armed Forces, the immediate transferral of perpetrators of extrajudicial killings to the International Criminal Court, a revision of the criteria regarding Ivorian citizenship, and new laws implemented to protect foreigners.

Through the agreement, the president also lost the right to appoint a prime minister, and a new reconciliation council would be created comprising 44 members across all parties, including rebel groups. Rebels from northern Côte d'Ivoire retained control of the Ministry of Defense and Ministry of the Interior, the FPI obtained ten ministries, and the RDR and PDCI each obtained control of seven. The Prime Minister would also be permanently appointed until the next election. The agreements gave the rebels and government an equal share of power.

== Implementation ==
Seydou Diarra was appointed prime minister at the end of the agreement, and was later appointed president on March 10. The United Nations authorized ECOWAS and France to deploy troops in Côte d'Ivoire to ensure the implementation of the ceasefire also delineated in the agreement on February 3, and the troops stayed until May 4. On May 13, the United Nations created MINUCI and redeployed French and ECOWAS troops in the country to implement the agreement. The rebels and Ivorian government declared an end to the civil war on July 4.

On a legal level, the Linas-Marcoussis agreements laid out a new constitution, although the Constitutional Court could only rule based on the previous constitution, making the new one only de jure applicable.

In October 2004, the rebels announced they would not disarm following the rearmament of the Armed Forces of the Republic of Ivory Coast.
