= United Nations Security Council Resolution 1721 =

UN Security Council Resolution 1721
- Côte d'Ivoire
- Date: 1 November 2006
- Meeting no.: 5,561
- Code: S/RES/1721 (Document)
- Subject: The situation in Côte d'Ivoire
- Voting summary: 15 voted for; None voted against; None abstained
- Result: Adopted

Security Council composition
- Permanent members: China; France; Russia; United Kingdom; United States
- Non-permanent members: Argentina; Rep. of the Congo; Denmark; Ghana; Greece; Japan; Peru; Qatar; Slovakia; Tanzania

United Nations Security Council Resolution 1721, adopted unanimously on November 1, 2006, after recalling previous resolutions on the situation in Côte d'Ivoire (Ivory Coast), the Council extended the transitional mandates of President Laurent Gbagbo and Prime Minister Charles Konan Banny for no more than a year.

Despite the passage of Resolution 1721, President Gbagbo declared his intention not to implement it as it "infringed" on aspects of Ivorian law; Prime Minister Banny's attempts to implement the resolution were neutralised by Gbagbo.

== Resolution ==
=== Observations ===
The Council was aware that the constitutional mandates of President Laurent Gbagbo expired on October 30, 2005, and the National Assembly on December 16, 2005. There was concern at the persistence of the crisis in Côte d'Ivoire and the large-scale suffering of the population. It also condemned violations of human rights and international humanitarian law.

=== Acts ===
Acting under Chapter VII of the United Nations Charter, the Council recognised the impossibility of holding elections by October 31, 2006. It endorsed the decision of the African Union Peace and Security Council to extend the transition periods of Gbagbo and Banney for a period not exceeding twelve months. The Prime Minister could not stand in the elections, and had to carry out the agreements reached, in particular:

- the execution of the disarmament, demobilisation and reintegration programme;
- voter registration;
- disarming and dismantling militia;
- restoring the authority of the state throughout the country;
- technical preparations for the elections;
- undertake reforms of the army.

The resolution demanded that all Ivorian parties end all incitement to hatred and violence through broadcast media, or violence in general. They also had to guarantee the freedom of movement and safety of Ivorian nationals throughout the country.

At the same time, it renewed the mandate of the High Representative for the Elections from Resolution 1603 (2005) for a period of twelve months. The African Union had encouraged the representative to play a bigger role in resolving disputes relating to elections and therefore were the only authority authorised to intervene to resolve problems and to certify stages of the electoral process.

Meanwhile, the United Nations Operation in Côte d'Ivoire (UNOCI) was asked to provide protection to United Nations personnel. All countries were urged to prevent the transfer of armed groups or weapons into Côte d'Ivoire. Finally, the Council concluded by underlining the responsibility of all Ivorian parties to implement the peace process.

== See also ==
- First Ivorian Civil War
- List of United Nations Security Council Resolutions 1701 to 1800 (2006–2008)
- Opération Licorne
