= Félix Doh =

Felix Doh (died 25 April 2003) was a rebel leader in Côte d'Ivoire. He was the leader of the Ivorian Popular Movement of the Great West (MPIGO), based in the western town of Danané, during the civil war that was fought in Côte d'Ivoire from late 2002 to early 2003. He seems to have fought alongside Liberian mercenaries initially, but fighting later erupted between the Ivorian rebels and these mercenaries in April 2003. Doh was reportedly killed, in uncertain circumstances, by the Liberian mercenaries, who were led by Sam Bockarie.
