= Ouagadougou Agreement =

Peace treaty to end the first Ivorian civil war

The Ouagadougou Agreement was signed on March 4, 2007 between Ivorian president Laurent Gbagbo, Forces Nouvelles de Côte d'Ivoire commander Guillaume Soro and Burkinabe president Blaise Compaoré. It aimed to bring an end to the First Ivorian Civil War, and was followed up by four complementary accords.

== Prelude ==
The Ivorian government and FNCI, along with other armed groups, had been in talks mediated by Burkinabe president Compaore in the Burkinabe capital of Ouagadougou since February 5 over ending the five-year long war. The talks culminated in the Ouagadougou Agreements on March 4.

== Accords ==
The first measure of the accords was the dismantling of a neutral zone separating northern Ivory Coast, controlled by the Forces Nouvelles (FNCI), and the government-held south led by Gbagbo. Areas in the former neutral zone were jointly occupied by government forces and FNCI soldiers. The ceasefire and the dismantling of the zone largely by 2008. On March 29, 2007, FNCI commander Soro was appointed Prime Minister of the country under Gbagbo as part of a transitional government. In the new government consisting of thirty-three government ministers, FNCI had seven, PDCI-RDA had five, Gbagbo's Ivorian Popular Front (PFI) had nine, Union for Democracy and Peace in Ivory Coast (UPDCI) had two, Rally of Republicans had five, the Democratic and Citizen's Union, Ivorian Labor Party, and Movement of the Forces for the Future had one each.

The agreement led to the end of the war, and the 2010 Ivorian presidential election that was initially scheduled in 2008.

== See also ==
- Linas-Marcoussis Agreement
