= United Nations Security Council Resolution 1643 =

UN Security Council Resolution 1643
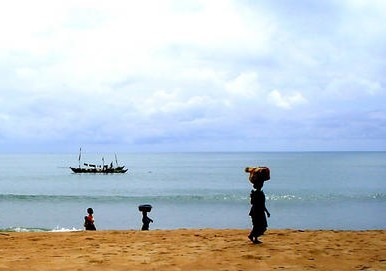
- Beach at Dagbego, Côte d'Ivoire
- Date: 15 December 2005
- Meeting no.: 5,327
- Code: S/RES/1643 (Document)
- Subject: The situation in Côte d'Ivoire
- Voting summary: 15 voted for; None voted against; None abstained
- Result: Adopted

Security Council composition
- Permanent members: China; France; Russia; United Kingdom; United States
- Non-permanent members: Algeria; Argentina; Benin; Brazil; Denmark; Greece; Japan; Philippines; Romania; Tanzania

United Nations Security Council Resolution 1643, adopted unanimously on 15 December 2005, after recalling previous resolutions on the situation in Côte d'Ivoire (Ivory Coast), the Council extended an arms embargo and travel and financial restrictions against the country until 15 December 2006, and included a ban on the trade of diamonds.

== Resolution ==
=== Observations ===
The Security Council expressed concern about the continuing crisis in the country. It called upon the Ivorian government and Forces Nouvelles to renounce violence, particularly against civilians and foreigners, and co-operate with the United Nations Operation in Côte d'Ivoire (UNOCI).

The preamble of the resolution also took note of a decision by the Kimberley Process Certification Scheme to prevent the introduction of diamonds from Côte d'Ivoire into the diamond trade and recognising the link between the illegal trade and exploitation of natural resources, arms trafficking and use of mercenaries in fuelling the conflict.

=== Acts ===
Under Chapter VII of the United Nations Charter, the Council extended sanctions imposed in Resolution 1572 (2004) for one year, further demanding that the government and rebels provide a list of weapons in their possession. A ban on the import of rough diamonds was imposed. All countries had to prevent the import of Ivorian diamonds on their territory and report within 90 days on measures they had taken to implement this measure. Further measures were also threatened against individuals who attempted to block the peace process, or who had committed violations of human rights and incited violence. It considered an attack on UNOCI, supporting French forces and others to constitute a threat to the national reconciliation process.

Finally, the Secretary-General Kofi Annan was instructed to establish a group of five experts for six months to investigate violations of the international sanctions and make recommendations on how countries in the region could implement the measures.

== See also ==
- First Ivorian Civil War
- List of United Nations Security Council Resolutions 1601 to 1700 (2005–2006)
- United Nations Operation in Côte d'Ivoire
