= United Nations Security Council Resolution 1603 =

UN Security Council Resolution 1603
- Côte d'Ivoire
- Date: 3 June 2005
- Meeting no.: 5,194
- Code: S/RES/1603 (Document)
- Subject: The situation in Côte d'Ivoire
- Voting summary: 15 voted for; None voted against; None abstained
- Result: Adopted

Security Council composition
- Permanent members: China; France; Russia; United Kingdom; United States
- Non-permanent members: Algeria; Argentina; Benin; Brazil; Denmark; Greece; Japan; Philippines; Romania; Tanzania

United Nations Security Council resolution 1603, adopted unanimously on 3 June 2005, after recalling previous resolutions on the situation in Côte d'Ivoire (Ivory Coast), the council extended the mandate of the United Nations Operation in Côte d'Ivoire (UNOCI) until 24 June 2005.

== Resolution ==
=== Observations ===
The security council reaffirmed its support for the Linas-Marcoussis Agreement and its full implementation. It commended the African Union, Economic Community of West African States (ECOWAS) and French forces for their efforts to promote a peaceful settlement in Côte d'Ivoire, but noted existing challenges to the stability of the country and its threat to international peace and security in the region.

There was concern that some peacekeeping troops deployed in African countries had engaged in misconduct.

=== Acts ===
Acting under Chapter VII of the United Nations Charter, the council demanded that all signatories to the Pretoria Agreement implement it fully, threatening sanctions against those who did not comply as described in Resolution 1572 (2004). The role of former South African President Thabo Mbeki in the mediation efforts was praised.

The council was satisfied that the Ivorian parties had agreed to hold presidential elections in October 2005 and demanded that the elections should be free, fair and transparent. The Secretary-General Kofi Annan was asked to appoint a special representative to monitor the conduct of these elections.

The resolution also extended the mandate of UNOCI and supporting French forces until 24 June 2005, and for the secretary-general to make arrangements for an increase in the strength of UNOCI. Finally, the secretary-general, African Union and France were asked to keep the council updated on the situation in Côte d'Ivoire.

== See also ==
- Ivorian Civil War
- List of United Nations Security Council Resolutions 1601 to 1700 (2005–2006)
- United Nations Operation in Côte d'Ivoire
