= France–Ivory Coast relations =

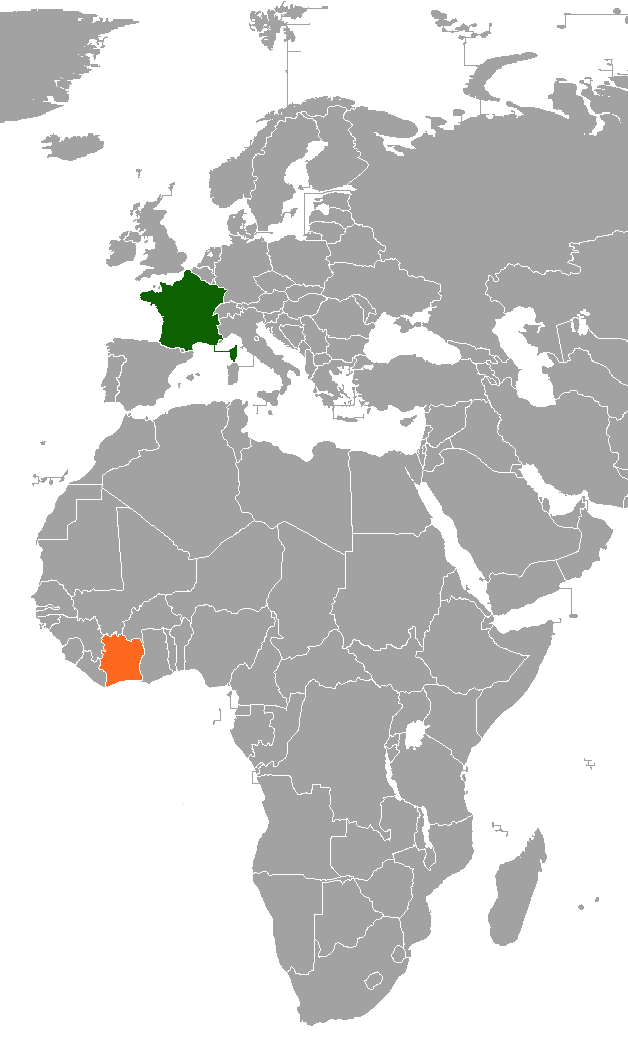
- France: Ivory Coast

France–Ivory Coast relations are the diplomatic relations between the French Republic and the Republic of Ivory Coast. Both nations are members of the Organisation internationale de la Francophonie and the United Nations.

== History ==
=== French colonization ===
Portuguese sailors were the first Europeans to encounter what would be present-day Ivory Coast. In 1687, a French mission was established in Assinie-Mafia, and it became the first European outpost in that area. In 1842 the French declared the area their protectorate. Formal French colonial rule was introduced in the 1880s following the Scramble for Africa during the Berlin Conference in 1884.

By the end of the 1880s, France had established what passed for effective control over the coastal regions of Ivory Coast, and in 1889 the United Kingdom recognized French sovereignty in the area. In 1893 Ivory Coast was made a French colony. In 1904, Ivory Coast became part of French West Africa.

During World War I and World War II, Ivorian soldiers fought for France. During World War II, Ivorian soldiers became part of the West African Senegalese Tirailleurs and Ivorian soldiers fought during the Battle of France and in the Italian Campaign under the Free France government-in-exile led by General Charles de Gaulle. After the Liberation of Paris and the end of World War II, Ivory Coast became part of the French Union in 1946. In 1958, Ivory Coast becomes a republic within the French Community. In August 1958, French President Charles de Gaulle paid a visit to Abidjan.

=== Independence ===
In December 1958, as part of the French Community, Ivory Coast became an autonomous republic as a result of a referendum on 7 August that year that brought community status to all members of the former Federation of French West Africa. On 11 July 1960 France agreed to Ivory Coast becoming fully independent.

Ivory Coast became independent on 7 August 1960, and was permitted its French Community membership to lapse. Felix Houphouet-Boigny became the first President of Ivory Coast.

=== Post Independence ===
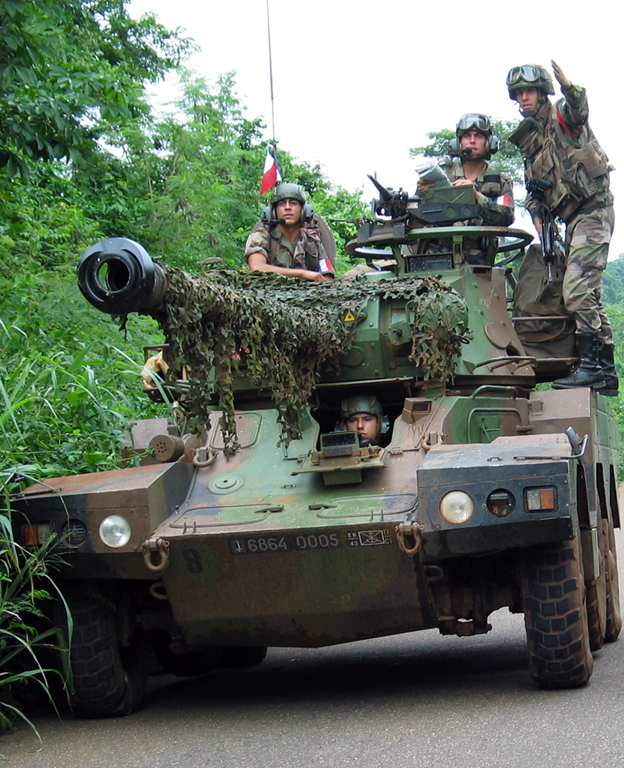
French Soldiers in Ivory Coast; 2003.

Immediately after obtaining independence, Ivory Coast came under the French sphere of influence known as Françafrique. Relations between both nations became close and France became Ivory Coast's largest trading partner.

In October 2000, Laurent Gbagbo became President of Ivory Coast. In 2002, the First Ivorian Civil War began mainly as a result of economic, ethnic and religious tension between the northern and southern parts of the country. France sent troops to the country to maintain peace and mediated during the civil war to negotiate a return to peace in the nation.

In November 2004, an armed conflict took place when Ivorian government jets attacked French peacekeepers in the northern part of the country where they were stationed there as part of Opération Licorne, the French military operation in support of the United Nations Operation in Ivory Coast (UNOCI). Nine French peacekeepers were killed in the attack. As a result, French military forces subsequently clashed with Ivorian troops and government-loyal mobs, and the French Air Force destroyed the entire Ivorian Air Force. These incidents were followed by massive anti-French protests in Ivory Coast and led to mobs attacking European nationals in the country. France sent an additional 600 soldiers to the country. In March 2007, a peace agreement was signed between the Ivorian government and the rebels.

In November 2010, the Second Ivorian Civil War began as a result of the 2010 Ivorian presidential election. In April 2011, French forces arrested Laurent Gbagbo at his residence in Abidjan thus ending the civil war. As a result, Alassane Ouattara became President of Ivory Coast.

There have been several high-level visits between leaders of both nations. In August 2017, President Ouattara traveled to Paris to meet with French President Emmanuel Macron. In December 2019, President Macron paid a visit to Abidjan.

In December 2024, Alassane Ouattara announced that the French military base in Abidjan would be handed over to Côte d'Ivoire in January 2025. On February 20, 2025, France officially handed over its sole military base in Ivory Coast to local authorities, marking a significant shift in their bilateral relations. This decision aligns with France's broader strategy to reduce its military footprint in West Africa, following similar withdrawals from countries like Chad, Senegal, Mali, Niger, and Burkina Faso. The base, previously home to the 43rd Marine Infantry Battalion (43rd BIMA), has been transferred to Ivorian control and renamed Camp Thomas d'Aquin Ouattara, in honor of the nation's first army chief. This move reflects Ivory Coast's growing emphasis on national sovereignty and the modernization of its armed forces. France had occupied the Port-Bouët military base for more than 50 years.

== French development assistance and investment in Ivory Coast ==
French investments in Ivory Coast has a diversified profile. More than 90% of the French investment stock is directed towards the following branches of activity: finance, hydrocarbons, electricity and water, construction, industry, agro-industry, transport, hotels, distribution, telecommunications and audiovisual. Around 700 French companies operate in Ivory Coast, including nearly 200 subsidiaries.

== Culture ==
On July 7, 2025, the National Assembly adopted the law declassifying the French collections of the talking drum "Djidji Ayokwe", for restitution to the Ivory Coast.

== Transportation ==
There are direct flights between Abidjan and Paris with Air France and Corsair International.

== French army bases ==
On January 1, 2025 Ivory coast announced that France will withdraw its troops from the state. An action that will reduce its military influence in the region.

== Resident diplomatic missions ==
- France has an embassy in Abidjan.
- Ivory Coast has an embassy in Paris and a consulate-general in Lyon.
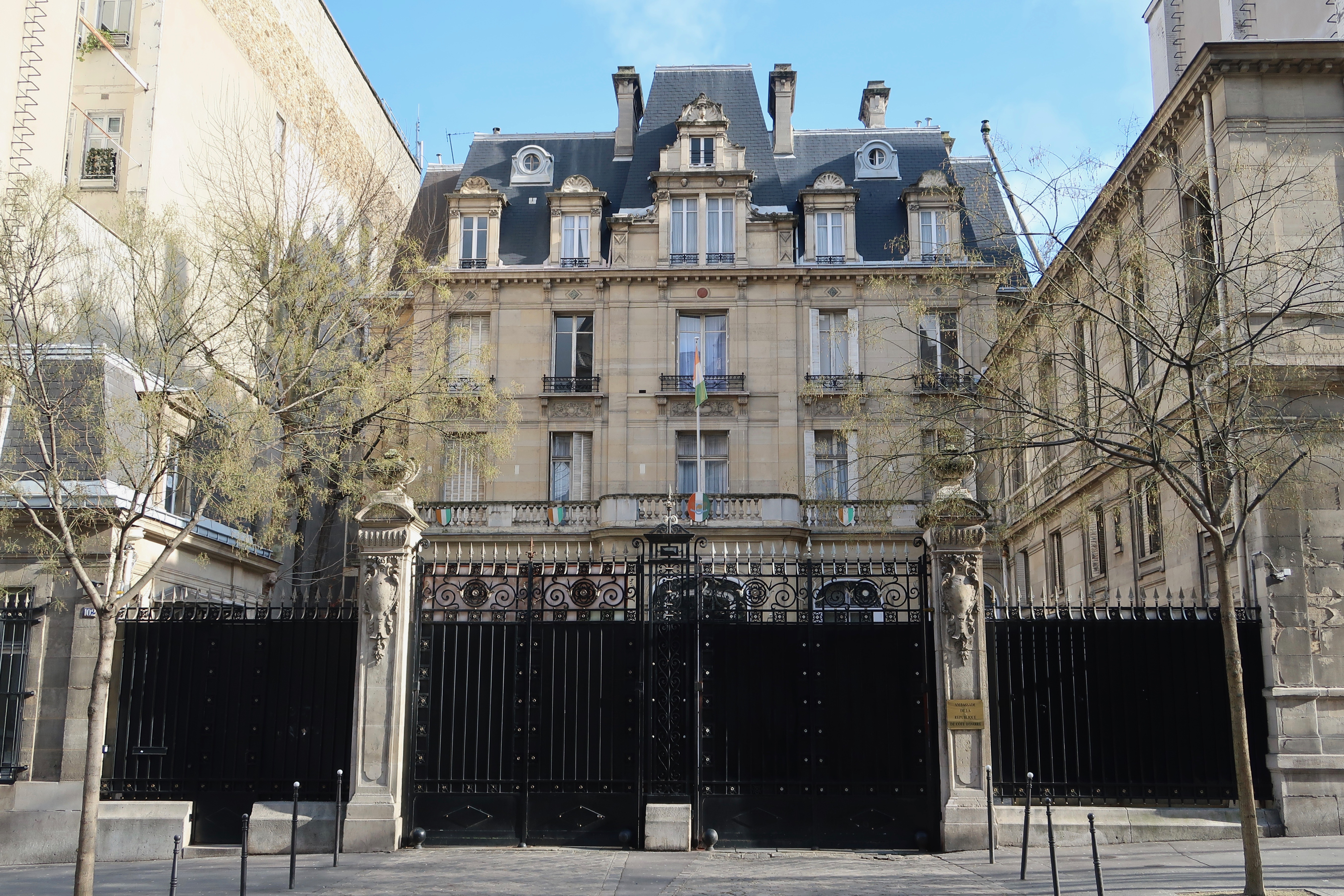
Embassy of Ivory Coast in Paris

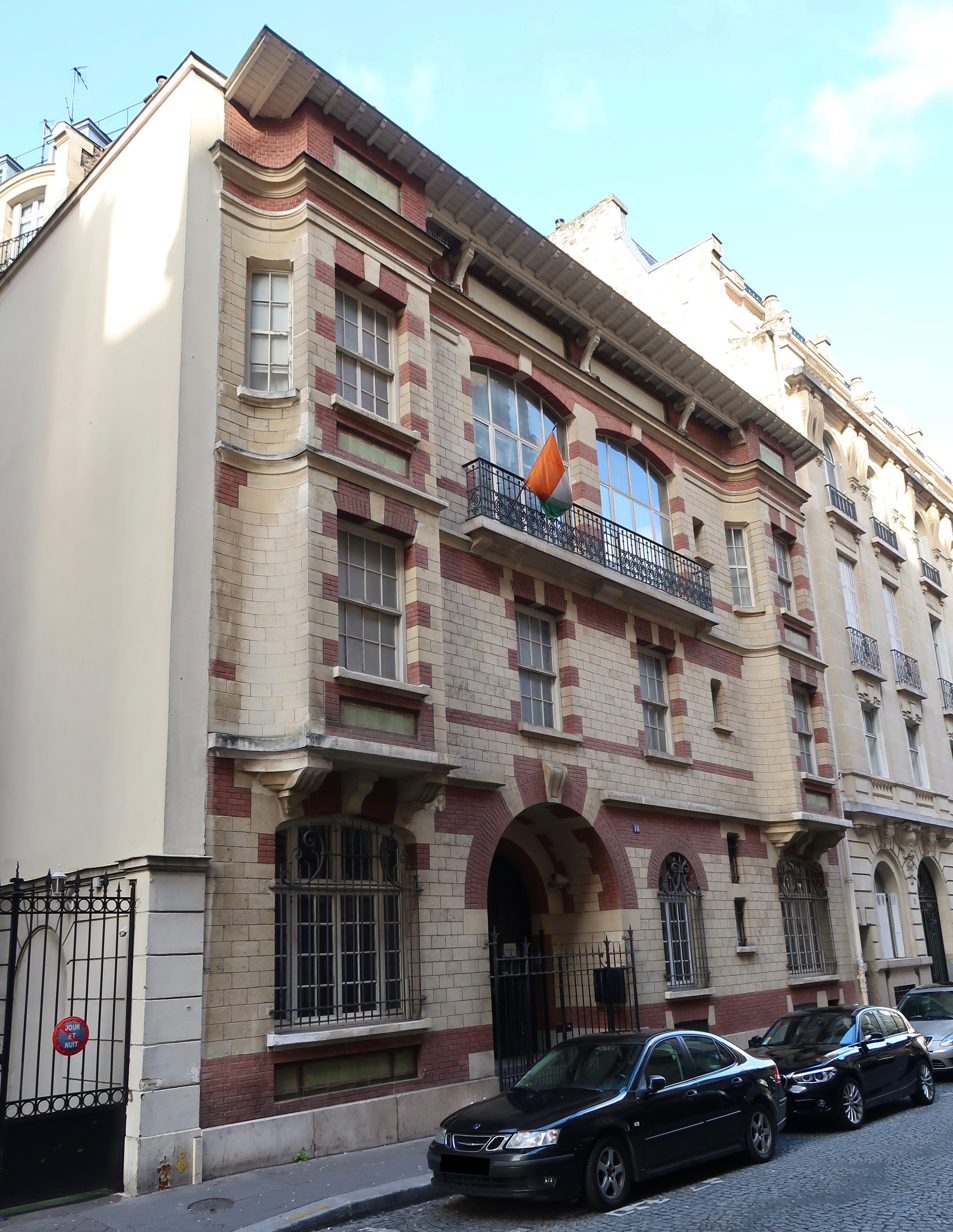
Consulate-General of Ivory Coast in Paris

== See also ==
- Françafrique
- French West Africa
- French people in Ivory Coast
- Ivorians in France
