= Patriotic Movement of Ivory Coast =

Rebel group and political party in Ivory Coast

Patriotic Movement of Ivory Coast Mouvement patriotique de Côte d'Ivoire
- Leader: Guillaume Soro
- Founded: 2005
- Ideology: Minority rights Liberal democracy Ivoirité; Ivorian nationalism
- Colours: Orange, white, green (Colours of the Ivorian flag)

Website
- Official website

The Patriotic Movement of Ivory Coast (Mouvement patriotique de Côte d'Ivoire, MPCI) was the major rebel group in the Ivorian Civil War, which since 2005, has transformed itself into a leading political party.

== Background of the MPCI and the Civil War ==
During the Civil War, the MPCI was referred to as the political wing of the rebel movement, with the Forces Nouvelles de Côte d'Ivoire as its armed wing. Led by northerner Guillaume Soro Kigbafori, who began his political career with the Student Federation of Ivory Coast which was closely allied to the then opposition Ivorian Popular Front (FPI). The MPCI also counts in its ranks Louis Dacoury Tabley, formerly the director of the FPI at the time of its foundation. Though essentially a northern party, the MPCI has representatives from across Ivory Coast.

During the civil war, the MPCI leaders commanded some 10,000 soldiers (of which 450 came from the Ivorian Army), and controlled 40% of the country (An addition 20% was controlled by allied rebels in the west). The party itself was formed in October 2002, following the army rebellion of 19 September 2002. The MPCI leaders cite the concept of "ivoirité", which former president H.K Bédié helped introduced into the political discourse in the 1990s, as a divisive factor which prompted their rebellion.

== Creation of FN political coalition ==
The Forces Nouvelles de Côte d'Ivoire (New Forces: FNCI or FN) was formed in December 2002 in the wake of the first peace accords.

FN includes these political parties:

- Patriotic Movement of Ivory Coast (Mouvement patriotique de Côte d'Ivoire, MPCI)
- Ivorian Popular Movement of the Great West (Mouvement populaire ivoirien du Grand Ouest, MPIGO)
- Movement for Justice and Peace (Mouvement pour la justice et la paix, MJP)

While the political coalition under which these parties operate is formally called the Forces Nouvelles de Côte d'Ivoire, in fact the MJP has folded into the MPCI, and the MPCI stands in for the coalition itself. There is no active FNCI organization independent of the MPCI as of 2007.

The phrase Forces Nouvelles remains a shorthand for the rebel side in the civil war.

== In the Government ==
^{from Guillaume Soro}

Following a peace agreement in January 2003, Soro joined the government as communications minister in April 2003. The New Forces ministers began a boycott of the government in September 2003 and returned to the government in January 2004. After an opposition demonstration held in Abidjan was violently broken up in March 2004, Soro and other former rebel and opposition ministers began boycotting the government. In turn, Gbagbo dismissed Soro from his position, along with two other ministers, on 19 May 2004. Soro denounced this move, saying that it was effectively a coup by Gbagbo against the peace agreement. On 9 August 2004 Soro attended a cabinet meeting and was reinstated in his position. On 28 December 2005, Soro was appointed minister of reconstruction and reintegration in the government of Prime Minister Charles Konan Banny; in this position he became the second ranking member of the government, after the prime minister. He did not, however, attend a cabinet meeting in this capacity until 15 March 2006.

Following a peace deal signed on March 4, 2007, it was considered a possibility that Soro would be named prime minister in a new government, and Gbagbo was said to want Soro as the next prime minister. In an interview published on March 26, Soro said that he would be willing to become prime minister. An agreement was signed on the same day according to which Soro would become prime minister, and Gbagbo was expected to officially appoint him to the position, which he did on 29 March. Soro took office on 4 April, and his government was named on April 7, with 32 ministers (excluding Soro himself); this was slightly fewer than in Banny's government, and Soro's government contained many of the same ministers as its predecessor.

In a speech broadcast on April 13, Soro apologized "to everybody and on behalf of everybody" for the harm caused by the war.

== See also ==
- Politics of Ivory Coast
- Ivorian Civil War
