= Flame of Peace (Côte d'Ivoire) =

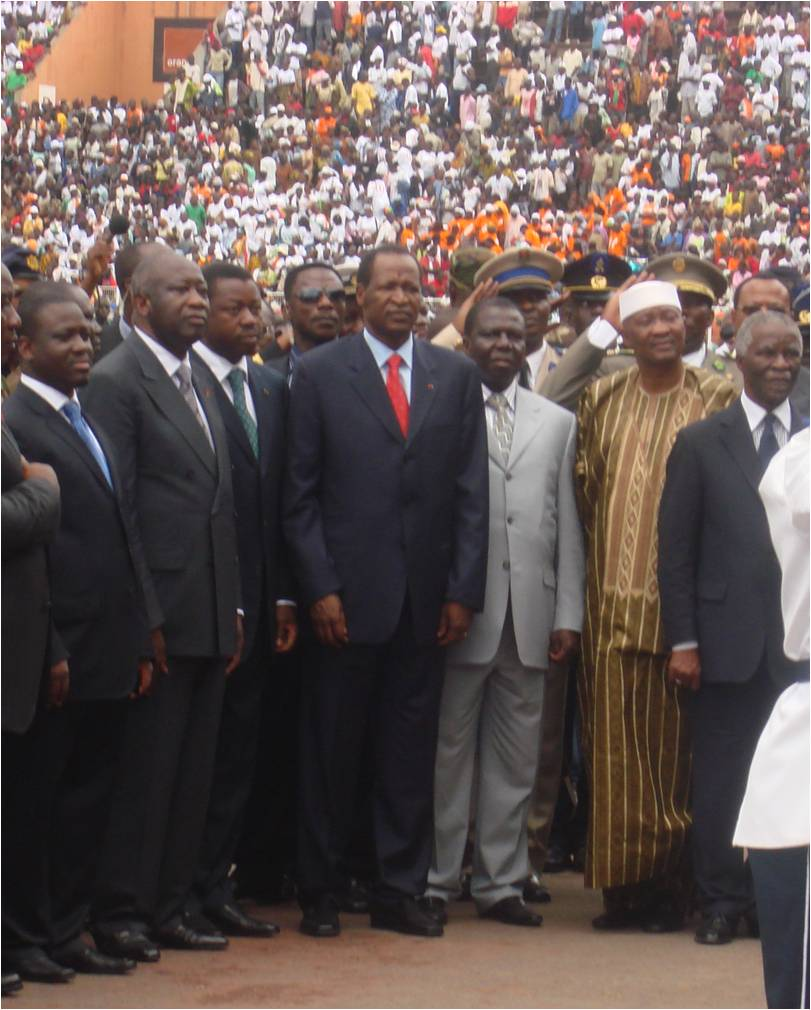
West African heads of state at the ceremony.

The Flame of Peace is the ceremony that officially marked the end of the First Ivorian Civil War. The ceremony took place on July 31, 2007, and was attended by Ivorian president Laurent Gbagbo and ex-rebel leader Guillaume Soro. Several West African leaders, such as Amadou Toumani Touré, Blaise Compaoré, Yayi Boni, Faure Gnassingbé, Nino Vieira, and Thabo Mbeki attended the inaugural ceremony.

== Event ==
The event took place at the Stade de la Paix in Bouaké, a rebel stronghold during the five-year civil war. Tens of thousands of people were present in the stadium, many wearing shirts that said "Flame of Peace, Bouake 2007, I was there". The ceremony marked Gbagbo's first time in the northern part of the country since the start of the civil war. The flame of peace made its way from Tiébissou, in the country's center, and ended at the stadium. When it reached the stadium, former Ivorian chief of staff Philippe Mangou and ex-rebel chief of staff Soumaila Bakayoko received the flame. A 105 mm artillery weapon was then sawed in half in the center of the stadium, and several small arms were thrown into an incinerator. Gbagbo and Soro each handed the other a weapon and declared their intent for peace, and Mangou and Bakayoko did the same. Afterwards, the flame of peace was passed between all four leaders and subsequently the visiting West African leaders.
