= Coffee production in Ivory Coast =

Coffee production in Ivory Coast is important for the economy of the country as coffee is the second largest export commodity of the country. It was the largest coffee producer in Africa in the 1970s and 1980s, and one of the largest robusta producers in the world. Today however, Ivorian coffee production has been far superseded by Vietnam and Brazil. It now ranks 14th in the world ranking.

== History ==
Coffee plants were introduced into the country in the 19th century by French colonizers. Following World War II, coffee production increased from 36,000 tons in 1945 to 112,500 tons in 1958. After Ivory Coast became independent (in 1960), coffee production peaked in the 1970s making it the third-largest coffee-producing country in the world, after Brazil and Colombia, before the civil war unsettled cultivation. Coffee production and policy are derived from the era when Ivory Coast was a colony of French West Africa. This has attracted French companies to invest in the sector.

== Production ==
Ivory Coast produces mostly robusta coffee.

According to the FAOSTAT database of the United Nations Food and Agriculture Organization, production of "green" (i.e., unroasted) coffee beans in the Ivory Coast was the following (in tons):

Year	Coffee Produced (tons)
1965	202,105
1970	279,610
1975	270,400
1980	249,608
1985	277,082
1990	285,164
1995	194,968
2000	380,000
2005	230,000
2010	94,372
2011	32,291
2012	121,426
2013	103,743
2014	114,387
2015	127,000
2016	106,000
2017	103,514

Production of green robusta coffee output in the nation peaked at 380,000 tons in 2000. Production subsequently declined over more than a decade of upheaval in the country, particularly during the First Ivorian Civil War (2002–2007) and Second Ivorian Civil War (2010–2011). In 2014, the Ivorian agriculture minister announced a new annual production target of 400,000 tons of coffee by 2020, about four times its present rate.

== See also ==
- List of countries by coffee production

== Bibliography ==
- Habeeb, William Mark (2 September 2014). Ivory Coast. Mason Crest. ISBN 978-1-4222-9437-6.
- Hamilton, Janice (1 January 2004). Ivory Coast in Pictures. Twenty-First Century Books. ISBN 978-0-8225-1992-8.
- Skinner, Snider William (1964). The agricultural economy of the Ivory Coast. U.S. Dept. of Agriculture, Economic Research Service, Regional Analysis Division.
- Thurston, Robert W.; Morris, Jonathan; Steiman, Shawn (10 October 2013). Coffee: A Comprehensive Guide to the Bean, the Beverage, and the Industry. Rowman & Littlefield Publishers. ISBN 978-1-4422-1442-2.
