= 2000 Ivorian constitutional referendum =

- 23–24 July 2000
- Do you approve of the Constitution proposed to you by the Government of the Republic?

Results
Choice	Votes	%
Yes	2,356,161	86.53%
No	366,853	13.47%
Valid votes	2,723,014	96.97%
Invalid or blank votes	85,143	3.03%
Total votes	2,808,157	100.00%
Registered voters/turnout	5,017,264	55.97%

A constitutional referendum was held in Ivory Coast on 23 and 24 July 2000. The changes to the constitution would require both parents of presidential candidates to have been born in the country, as well as giving immunity from prosecution from those involved in the coup the previous year. It was approved by 86.53% of voters with a 56% turnout.

The changes barred Rally of the Republicans leader Alassane Ouattara from standing in the presidential elections, and was one of the catalysts for the Ivorian Civil War.

== Results ==
Choice	Votes	%
For	2,356,161	86.53
Against	366,853	13.47
Invalid/blank votes	85,143	-
Total	2,808,157	100
