= West African Crisis =

The term West African Crisis refers to four civil wars in West Africa from 1989 to 2007, seeing rebels supported by Libya under Muammar Gaddafi and Burkina Faso under Blaise Compaoré:

- First Liberian Civil War (1989–1997)
- Sierra Leone Civil War (1991–2002)
- Second Liberian Civil War (1999–2003)
- First Ivorian Civil War (2002–2007)

It can also refer to other events in West Africa:

- 2023 Nigerien coup d'état and subsequent Nigerien crisis (2023–2024)

== See also ==
- Insurgency in the Maghreb (2002–present)
- Second Ivorian Civil War (2010–2011)
- Mali War (2012–present)
- Coup Belt
