= United Nations Security Council Resolution 1479 =

UN Security Council Resolution 1479
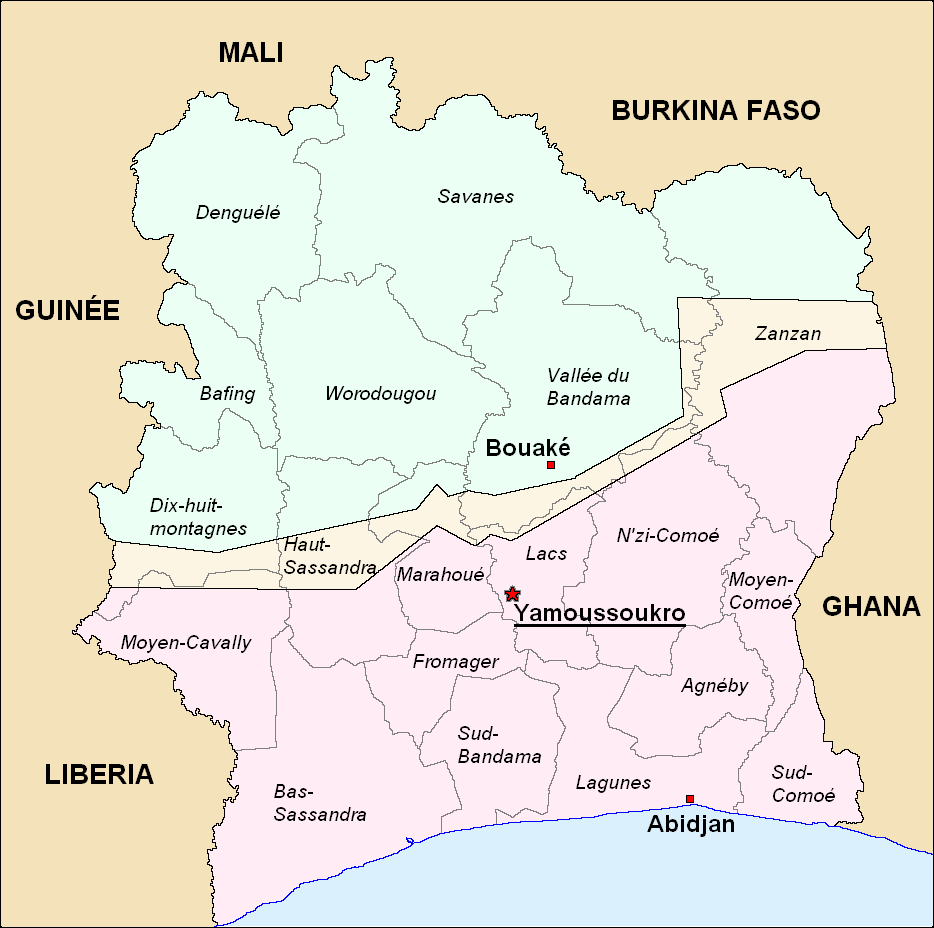
- Buffer zone (yellow) in Côte d'Ivoire
- Date: 13 May 2003
- Meeting no.: 4,754
- Code: S/RES/1479 (Document)
- Subject: The situation in Côte d'Ivoire
- Voting summary: 15 voted for; None voted against; None abstained
- Result: Adopted

Security Council composition
- Permanent members: China; France; Russia; United Kingdom; United States
- Non-permanent members: Angola; Bulgaria; Chile; Cameroon; Germany; Guinea; Mexico; Pakistan; Spain; Syria

United Nations Security Council resolution 1479, adopted unanimously on 13 May 2003, after reaffirming Resolution 1464 (2003) on the situation in Côte d'Ivoire (Ivory Coast) and resolutions 1460 (2003) and 1467 (2003), the council established the United Nations Mission in Côte d'Ivoire (MINUCI) after determining the situation in the country to be a threat to international peace and security in the region.

== Resolution ==
=== Observations ===
The Security Council began by recalling the importance of good-neighbourliness, non-interference and regional co-operation. It welcomed efforts by the Economic Community of West African States (ECOWAS), the African Union and France to promote a peaceful settlement to the civil war, and reiterated its endorsement of the Linas-Marcoussis Agreement.

=== Acts ===
The role of the Special Representative of the Secretary-General in leading the United Nations system in Côte d'Ivoire was reaffirmed, and, for an initial period of six months, MINUCI would be established to facilitate the implementation of the Linas-Marcoussis Agreement and complement the operations of ECOWAS and French forces. A small number of support staff were also approved, to: provide assistance to the Special Representative on military issues; monitor the military and refugee situation and liaise with ECOWAS, French and National Armed Forces of Côte d'Ivoire (FANCI) forces. The military liaison component would initially consist of 26 officers and special attention would be given to human rights, particularly concerning women and children in accordance with Resolution 1325 (2000).

All Ivorian parties were called upon to fully implement the Linas-Marcoussis Agreement and of the importance of allowing the Government of National Reconciliation to exercise its mandate during the transitional period. There was a need to bring to justice those responsible for violations of human rights and international humanitarian law and the Council stressed the importance of early disarmament, demobilisation and reintegration procedures. Furthermore, Ivorian parties were requested to co-operate with MINUCI throughout the duration of its mandate and ensure the safety and freedom of movement of its personnel, while the ECOWAS and French forces had to report periodically on the implementation of their mandates.

The resolution welcomed a ceasefire agreement between FANCI and the Forces Nouvelles. All states in the region were asked to support the peace process in Côte d'Ivoire and refrain from actions that could undermine the security and stability of the country, including the movement of armed groups and weapons across their borders. Ivorian parties were urged to refrain from recruiting mercenaries, foreign military units and child soldiers.

Resolution 1479 concluded by urging logistical and financial support to the ECOWAS force and for the Secretary-General Kofi Annan to report every three months on the implementation of the current resolution.

== See also ==
- Ivorian Civil War
- List of United Nations Security Council Resolutions 1401 to 1500 (2002–2003)
- Opération Licorne
