= First Ivorian Civil War =

2002–2007 civil war in Cote d'Ivoire

- Part of the West African Crisis and the Ivorian Civil Wars
Date	19 September 2002 – 4 March 2007 (4 years, 5 months, 1 week and 6 days)
Location	Ivory Coast
Result	War agreement, followed by renewed conflict

Belligerents
Ivory Coast; COJEP	FNCI: MPCI; MPIGO; MJP	France; UNOCI

Commanders and leaders
(Ivory Coast) Laurent Gbagbo (Ivory Coast) Charles Blé Goudé	(Ivory Coast) Guillaume Soro	Jacques Chirac; Kofi Annan

Casualties and losses
300+ government soldiers 100+ militias 1,200+ civilians	400+ rebels	16 French soldiers 36 UN personnel
- 900–4,000 casualties overall (UCDP); 750,000 people displaced (UNHCR)

The First Ivorian Civil War was a civil conflict in the Ivory Coast (Côte d'Ivoire) that began with a military rebellion on 19 September 2002 and ended with a peace agreement on 4 March 2007. The conflict pitted the government of Ivorian President Laurent Gbagbo against a domestic insurgency led by the New Forces of Ivory Coast (Forces nouvelles de Côte d'Ivoire). A second civil war (2010–2011) followed the first after the results of the 2010 Ivorian presidential election.

The war was preceded by a tumultuous decade in the Ivory Coast, marked by an economic downturn and, following the death of long-time Ivorian President Félix Houphouët-Boigny in 1993, a leadership succession crisis. The succession crisis manifested in a 1999 military coup d'état and a violent dispute over the result of the 2000 presidential election. Three successive Ivorian leaders – Henri Konan Bédié from 1993, Robert Guéï from 1999, and Gbagbo from 2000 – exploited the ideology of Ivoirité to repress and marginalise political opposition, notably by disqualifying Alassane Ouattara from contesting elections on the basis of his Burkinabé nationality. In the process, these leaders stoked ethnic tensions and xenophobic sentiment in the country.

War broke out on 19 September 2002 when troops opposed to President Gbagbo – and under the political leadership of the Patriotic Movement of Ivory Coast (MPCI, Mouvement patriotique de Côte d'Ivoire) – attacked three Ivorian cities, including Abidjan. The rebel forces sought a re-run of the 2000 election and demanded that the Ivory Coast's exclusionary citizenship policies be reformed. Though they failed to take Abidjan, the rebels quickly established control over much of the north of the country. Two new rebel groups along the Liberian border, the Movement for Justice and Peace (Mouvement pour la justice et la paix) and the Ivorian Popular Movement of the Great West (Mouvement populaire ivoirien du Grand Ouest), battled government forces for western territory before uniting with MPCI to become the New Forces in December 2002. Across the country, the New Forces clashed with the Young Patriots (Congrès panafricain des jeunes et des patriotes) and other pro-government militias.

The conflict attracted international attention. Ivory Coast's former colonizer, France, launched a military intervention soon after the initial rebellion. Though Opération Licorne had a protection mandate and pleaded its neutrality in the conflict, the French intervention was attacked by Ivorian nationalists as an example of neocolonialism. Ivorian nationalists sustained public demonstrations against French intervention. In 2004, there were fatal clashes between Ivorian and French forces. The United Nations (UN) was involved in the conflict first through a political mission, the UN Mission in Côte d'Ivoire, and then through an ambitious peacekeeping mission, the UN Operation in Côte d'Ivoire. The latter was deployed in April 2004 and absorbed the smaller contingent of peacekeepers that had been sent earlier by the Economic Community of West African States (ECOWAS).

The violence largely subsided by the end of 2004, but the country remained under de facto partition – with a rebel-held north and a government-held south – while the political crisis continued. Though the multi-party Linas-Marcoussis Accord established a power-sharing Government of National Reconciliation in early 2003, its provisions regarding disarmament and political reform were not implemented. A comprehensive political settlement was finally reached in 2007, when Gbagbo and the New Forces signed the Ouagadougou Peace Agreement in Ouagadougou, Burkina Faso. However, when the Ivory Coast held its presidential elections in 2010, the first since 2000, Gbagbo refused to accept the result, sparking a renewed political crisis and the beginning of the Second Ivorian Civil War.

== Origins and context ==
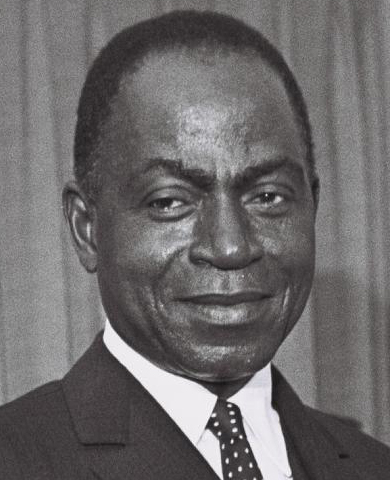
Félix Houphouët-Boigny died in 1993, after 30 years in power.

=== Leadership succession ===
When Ivorian President Félix Houphouët-Boigny died in 1993, the end of his thirty-three-year presidency inaugurated a prolonged "crisis of succession", which destabilised Ivorian politics for the remainder of the 1990s. Since the Ivory Coast's independence from France in 1960, Houphouët-Boigny had maintained Ivorian political and economic stability using mechanisms largely dependent on his own personal charisma, networks, and so-called Françafrique connections; the country lacked established mechanisms to regulate democratic competition. As required by the constitution following his death, Houphouët-Boigny was succeeded by Henri Konan Bédié, the President of the National Assembly, who also replaced Houphouët-Boigny at the head of the ruling Democratic Party of Ivory Coast (PDCI, Parti démocratique de la Côte d'Ivoire). However, ahead of the 1995 presidential election, opposition politicians began to organise for democratic regime change in open and competitive elections.

One powerful opposition leader was Laurent Gbagbo, whose Ivorian Popular Front (FPI, Front populaire ivoirien) had long agitated for democratisation under Houphouët-Boigny. Another was Alassane Ouattara, Houphouët-Boigny's Prime Minister, who had launched an abortive challenge to Bédié's leadership in the weeks after Houphouët-Boigny's death, and who in 1994 split from PDCI to establish his own party, Rally of the Republicans (RDR, Rassemblement des républicains). Both opposition groups boycotted the 1995 election in protest of changes to the electoral code: Bédié's PDCI retained power, but at the cost of harming its popular legitimacy. After 1995, the opposition continued to gain political ground. This political change coincided, from the late 1990s, with renewed economic downturn in Ivory Coast, exacerbated by the liberalisation of key agricultural sectors, notably coffee and cocoa, under an International Monetary Fund (IMF) structural adjustment programme.

=== Ivoirité ===
Ivory Coast has historically received large numbers of immigrants from neighbouring West African countries, especially Burkina Faso, and the flow of immigration was sustained after independence, both due to Ivory Coast's relative prosperity and due to the favourable policies of Houphouët-Boigny's government: for example, between 1960 and 1972, any person born in Ivory Coast could receive Ivorian citizenship, regardless of their parents' nationality. A majority of immigrants were Muslim: the share of Muslims in the Ivorian population increased from approximately six per cent in 1922 to 38.6 per cent in 1998. By then, they outnumbered the country's Christians, and were particularly numerous in the north of the country. Although immigration slowed from the 1990s, the Muslim population continued to grow in demographic importance due to a widening fertility gap.

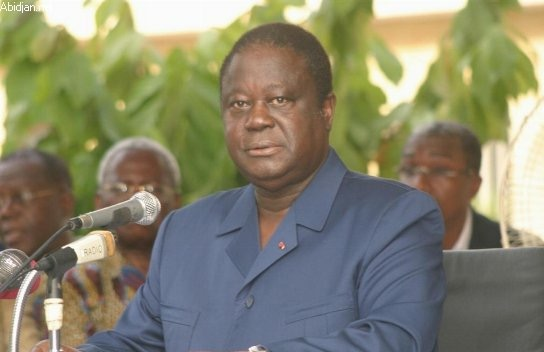
President Henri Konan Bédié used Ivoirité to undermine his political rivals.

Academic analyses agree that a key root cause of the Ivorian civil war was the spread of nativist and xenophobic discourse, its mobilisation by opportunistic politicians, and the resulting ethnic tensions. Central in this regard was the rise of Ivoirité as an ideology and state policy under President Bédié, and its use to marginalise and exclude immigrants, their descendants, and certain groups of Ivorian citizens. Ethnic tensions, xenophobic sentiment, and related communal disputes in Ivory Coast predated Bédié's rule, but Houphouët-Boigny had been able to accommodate, manage, and suppress them. Under Bédié, however, the rise of Ivoirité politicised such disputes, making origin and religious affiliation "the prime markers of identity" in Ivory Coast. Land disputes were increasingly framed in ethnic terms, and became increasingly common in the late 1990s: Houphouët-Boigny's liberal land policies had extended access to land to both internal and foreign migrants, and rising urban unemployment in the 1990s – resulting in back-migration to rural areas – led to intensified competition over fertile land.

Sociologist Francis Akindès notes that Ivoirité under Bédié had undertones which valorised Akan identity (the ethnic group of both Bédié and Houphouët-Boigny) and Christian identity; but the central variant of Ivoirité was framed as a form of patriotism and used national origin as the measure of "Ivorianness". Yet adjudicating residents' claims to Ivorian nationality was a complicated task, resting on a controversial distinction between "indigenous" Ivorians and Ivorians "of immigrant ancestry". Groups perceived as foreign had long histories of migration to Ivory Coast, both before and during colonialism – Burkinabés, for example, had been represented among Ivorian residents since before states existed in either Burkina Faso or Ivory Coast – and many of their members had been citizens for multiple generations. In this context, even the more inclusive nationality-based variant of Ivoirité had a marked tendency to denigrate and exclude groups of Ivorian citizens, notably the Dioula population of northern Ivory Coast.

Ouattara was himself Dioula – though he insisted he was an Ivorian national – and drew much of his support base from the predominantly Muslim north, particularly poor immigrants and their descendants on northern agricultural plantations. In November 1994, ahead of the 1995 presidential election, Bédié had the National Assembly amend the electoral code to require that presidential candidates should be Ivorian-born with two Ivorian-born parents (where previously only one such parent had been required). This was viewed as a strategic move to avert a leadership challenge from Ouattara, who at that point remained Bédié's rival inside PDCI.

=== Coup and election violence ===
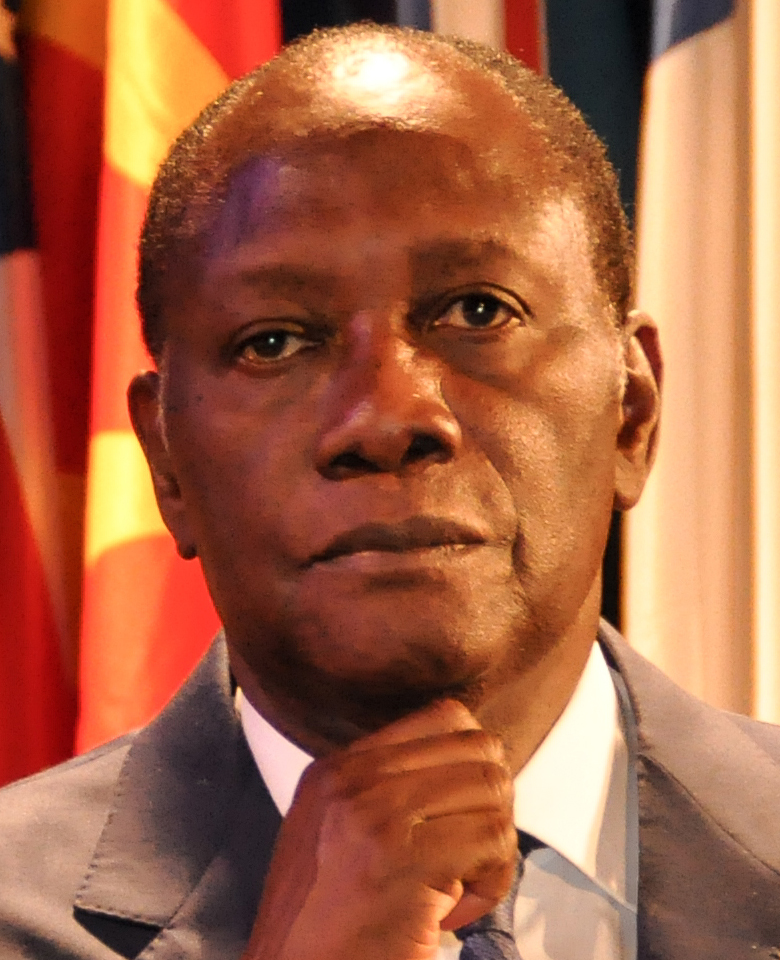
Alassane Ouattara was barred from contesting the 1995 and 2000 elections.

Former army commander Robert Guéï assumed power in December 1999, in a coup d'état which overthrew Bédié. The coup originated in a mutiny, itself occasioned by Bédié's refusal to release detained RDR members or to meet other demands of the relevant faction of the military. Guéï had been fired by Bédié in 1995, reportedly because he declined to deploy the military during pre-election public demonstrations, and, once in office, he said that the new military government would seek to reverse Bédié's changes to the electoral code. However, it did the opposite: in July 2000, the Ivory Coast adopted by referendum a constitutional amendment which, under article 35 of the constitution, would permanently restrict eligibility for the presidency to those "of Ivorian origin, born of a father and mother who are also Ivorian by birth". This provision was used to maintain Ouattara's disqualification, and the candidacy of other opposition leaders was also blocked. As a result, Gbagbo was the only major opposition figure allowed to challenge Guéï in the 2000 presidential election. Gbagbo won the election, although Guéï refused to cede power to him until forced to do so by violent public protests in which 206 people were killed and 1,207 injured. In the violence, FPI supporters reportedly targeted not only Guéï's forces but also supporters of Ouattara's RDR, as well as northerners and immigrants who they assumed supported RDR.

President Gbagbo took up the mantle of Ivoirité and further entrenched it in state institutions. According to Human Rights Watch, Gbagbo's security forces committed abuses against civilians, targeting – on the basis of their nationality, ethnicity, or religion – immigrants, their descendants, and Ivorians from the north. Moreover, in 2001, the FPI government introduced a new national identification system, under which residents applying for official identity documents were required to prove their nationality, including the locality of their place of birth, to a new National Identification Office (ONI, Office national d'identification). This policy affected the voting rights not only of immigrants but also of many northern Ivorians. Thus the political transition to Gbago's government did little to ease ethnic tensions. For related reasons, and as throughout Guéï's rule, the mood in the military remained generally mutinous, and Gbagbo faced opposition from both Guéï loyalists and Ouattara sympathisers within the army. An attempted coup in January 2001, which Gbagbo blamed on the interference of Burkina Faso, led to renewed attacks on Burkinabé residents by FPI supporters.

== Belligerents ==
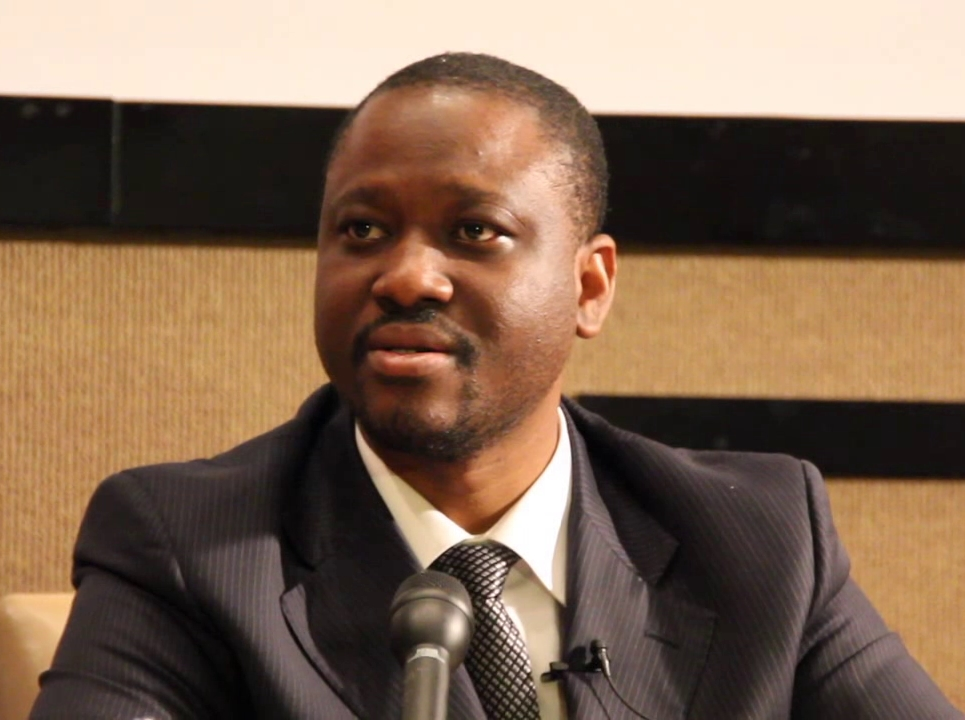
Rebel leader Guillaume Soro led the Patriotic Movement of Ivory Coast and the New Forces.

=== Rebel forces ===
The primary rebel force in the civil war was the New Forces of Ivory Coast (FNCI, Forces nouvelles de Côte d'Ivoire), created in December 2002 as a coalition between the Patriotic Movement of Ivory Coast (MPCI, Mouvement patriotique de Côte d'Ivoire), the Ivorian Popular Movement of the Great West (MPIGO, Mouvement populaire ivoirien du Grand Ouest), and the Movement for Justice and Peace (MJP, Mouvement pour la justice et la paix). Guillaume Soro led the MPCI, whose insurgency began the war, and he became the general secretary of FNCI. At least a significant portion of MPCI was aligned or sympathetic to the Rally of the Republicans (RDR, Rassemblement des républicains), Alassane Ouattara's opposition party, while MPIGO and MJP claimed allegiance to Ivory Coast's former military leader, Robert Guéï, who died at the beginning of the war.

The Ivorian government claimed that MPCI was supported by Burkina Faso, an allegation which Burkinabé President Blaise Compaore repeatedly denied. The International Crisis Group, however, regarded the allegation as plausible: sources in the Burkinabé government reported that arms had been delivered to the rebels by air, and Western intelligence proved that some of the arms used in the rebels' initial attacks had come from the Burkinabé Presidential Guard stocks. However, both International Crisis Group and Western intelligence reports gave less credence to Gbagbo's further accusation that Burkinabé troops had participated directly in the initial attacks. MPIGO and MJP were reported to have received assistance from the Liberian government, reflecting a partial spillover of the Liberian Civil War, and, according to a March 2003 report by Global Witness, 90% of MJP and MPIGO forces were Liberian or Sierra Leonean mercenaries, many of them ex-members of Charles Taylor's Revolutionary United Front.

=== Government forces ===
President Laurent Gbagbo was supported by loyalists in the state security services and National Armed Forces (FANCI, Forces armées nationales de Côte d'Ivoire). In addition, he reportedly recruited foreign mercenaries, some of whom had previously been affiliated with the South Africa-based Executive Outcomes, and including a number of Belarusian pilots. Various civilian militias supported Gbagbo and his political party, the Ivorian Popular Front (FPI, Front populaire ivoirien) – the most important among them was the Young Patriots' Pan-African Congress (COJEP, Congrès panafricain des jeunes et des patriotes). In 2005, Human Rights Watch reported that the Ivorian government had also recruited foreign combatants, primarily from Liberia, and including child soldiers. According to the Stockholm International Peace Research Institute, between 2002 and 2004, the Ivorian government purchased arms from Angola, Belarus, Bulgaria, Israel, Romania, and Ukraine.

=== International forces ===
The French military launched its intervention in Ivory Coast, Opération Licorne, on 22 September 2002, three days after the start of the war, with an initial focus on protecting French and other foreign nationals. Originally a contingent of 700, Opération Licorne comprised 4,000 troops by July 2003. The Economic Community of West African States (ECOWAS) deployed its own peace force on 18 January 2003.

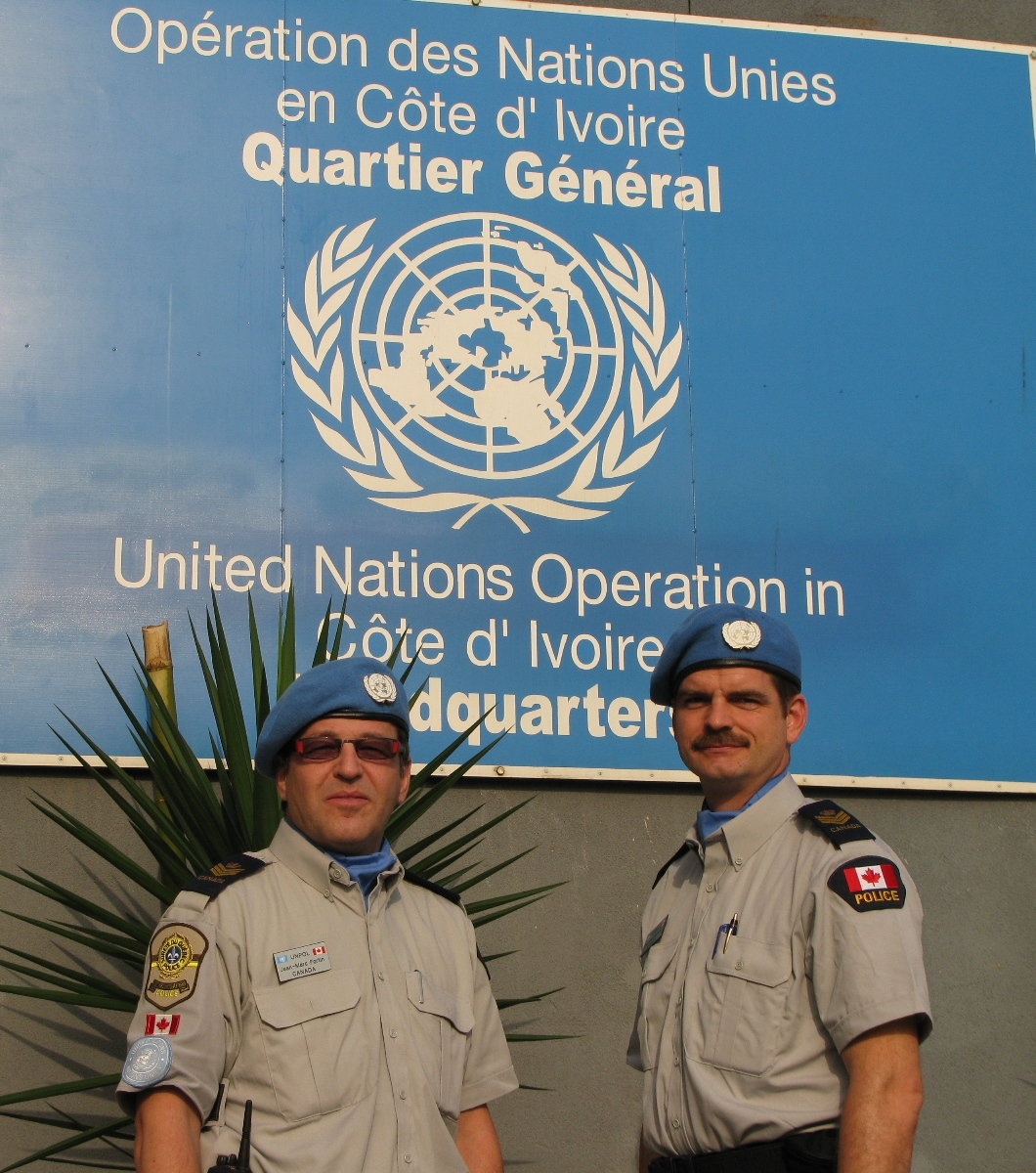
Officers at the headquarters of the UN Operation in Côte d'Ivoire.

The United Nations (UN) had an official presence in Ivory Coast from 6 February 2003, when UN Secretary General Kofi Annan appointed Albert Tévoédjrè as his Special Representative in Ivory Coast. From 27 June 2003, Tévoédirè was supported by the UN Mission in Côte d'Ivoire (MINUCI, Mission des Nations unies en Côte d'Ivoire), established by Resolution 1479 of the UN Security Council, with a mandate to monitor implementation of the Linas-Marcoussis Accord. The following year, Security Council Resolution 1528 replaced MINUCI with an ambitious peacekeeping operation, the United Nations Operation in Côte d'Ivoire (UNOCI). UNOCI deployed on 4 April 2004 and helped France police the buffer zone between the belligerents. It had an initial authorised strength of 6,240 uniformed personnel, and was further expanded by Resolution 1609 in 2005 and Resolution 1682 in 2006. By mid-2007, it comprised just over 9,000 uniformed personnel from more than 40 countries. ECOWAS re-hatted its troops and handed over to UNOCI in April 2004, but, for practical and financial reasons, the Security Council allowed the French Operation Licorne to remain in place under its own chain of command.

== Outbreak of civil war ==
=== Military rebellion: 19 September 2002 ===
The "opening salvo" in the war was a rebellion against Gbagbo's government by Ivorian troops, who on 19 September 2002 executed a well-coordinated simultaneous attack on three Ivorian cities, including the largest city, Abidjan. It was reportedly planned by former pro-RDR or pro-Guéï dissidents in the military and in the Student Federation of Ivory Coast (FESCI, Fédération estudiantine et scolaire de Côte d'Ivoire). According to the International Crisis Group, the rebellion involved about 750 troops, but it reportedly originated in a smaller protest of about 200 soldiers, primarily from the north of the country, who objected to their demobilisation by the government, viewing it as ethnically motivated.

A severe response from the government – which included demolishing the homes of immigrant workers accused of supporting the rebellion – was supported by ad hoc pro-government militias. Guéï was shot dead on the day of the rebellion – according to his family, while having lunch – "in circumstances that lead many to believe the government wanted him eliminated". After Ouattara's house was burned down, he took refuge at the French ambassador's residence; while former President Bédié was accommodated at the Canadian ambassador's residence. Having failed to take Abidjan, the rebels – who later identified themselves as the Patriotic Movement of Ivory Coast (MPCI, Mouvement patriotique de Côte d'Ivoire) – retreated northwards, and they quickly established control over much of the north, including the cities of Bouaké and Korhogo.

=== French intervention: 22 September 2002 ===
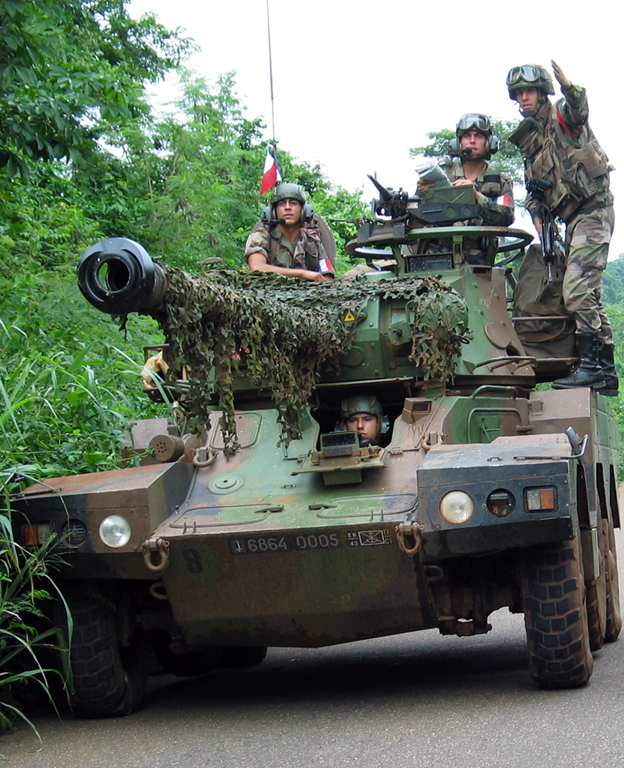
An ERC 90 Sagaie of the French 1st Parachute Hussar Regiment in Ivory Coast.

Ivory Coast's former colonial power, France, was invested in the outcome of the conflict – given its significant business interests in Ivory Coast, and the presence of more than 20,000 French citizens there – but was extremely reluctant to intervene in support of Gbagbo. Nonetheless, on 22 September, France launched Operation Licorne, with an initial mandate focused on protecting and evacuating French nationals and other foreign nationals. Indeed, in the weeks after the rebellion, French and American forces evacuated 2,500 people – mostly foreign nationals – from the Ivory Coast. Operation Licorne was initially staffed by the 650 troops regularly based in Ivory Coast under the terms of a bilateral defence agreement. These were soon supplemented by additional troops shifted from French bases in Gabon and other African countries, as well as by a deployment of 70 additional paratroopers in October. France emphasised the forces' protection mandate, saying repeatedly that it was not intervening in the conflict, but the presence of French troops soon became crucial to the government's security, for example in barring rebel advances on the capital city, Yamoussoukro. It was also reported that France had agreed to provide Gbagbo's government with logistical support and tactical advice. However, both sides – the government and the rebels – accused France of supporting the other, and the French intervention faced opposition from a segment of the Ivorian public: on 22 October, French troops dispersed a demonstration outside their base, using grenades and tear gas to do so.

=== Partial ceasefire: October–December 2002 ===
The conflict continued to intensify, as both sides recruited and armed thousands of civilians – and, on the government side, contracted foreign mercenaries. However, on September 29, the Economic Community of West African States (ECOWAS) launched peace negotiations in Accra, Ghana, under the mediation of a high-level contact group comprising representatives from Ghana, Guinea-Bissau, Mali, Niger, Nigeria, and Togo. This initiative resulted on 17 October in a ceasefire between MPCI and the Ivorian government, as well as an agreement to continue substantive peace talks under ECOWAS auspices. Further bilateral talks were held in Lomé, Togo, in October and November, but failed to break a political deadlock: MPCI demanded Gbagbo's removal, fresh elections, and a review of the constitution.

By then, moreover, MPCI was no longer the sole rebel group involved in the conflict. While MPCI continued to hold much of the north and the government much of the south, by the end of November, two rebel groups were operating in the west, near the Liberian border: the Movement for Justice and Peace (MJP, Mouvement pour la justice et la paix) and the Ivorian Popular Movement of the Great West (MPIGO, Mouvement populaire ivoirien du Grand Ouest). Both groups demanded Gbagbo's resignation and revenge for Guéï's death. On 28 November, MJP and MPIGO took control of Man, and French troops were drawn into hot conflict for the first time, recapturing the airport in a battle which killed ten rebels and injured one French soldier. On the government side, FPI supporters, led by the Young Patriots (COJEP, Congrès panafricain des jeunes et des patriotes), clashed frequently with opposition supporters in violent communal political demonstrations.

By the middle of December 2002, 400 people had died in the conflict and 100,000 more had been displaced. At that time, there were more than 2,500 French troops, including members of the Foreign Legion, in the Ivory Coast; their mission had been enhanced, to include enforcing the 17 October ceasefire by maintaining a buffer zone between rebel forces in the north and government in the south. In December, the rebels regrouped politically, with MJP and MPGIO joined MPCI as junior partners in a new political coalition, the New Forces of Ivory Coast (FNCI, Forces Nouvelles de Côte d'Ivoire), led by Guillaume Soro of the MPCI. This merger was viewed as a strategic choice to improve the rebels' bargaining position ahead of upcoming peace talks. Thereafter, the New Forces administered its northern territories in ten "comzones", each headed by a zone commander, who was typically a former military officer.

== First round of peace talks ==
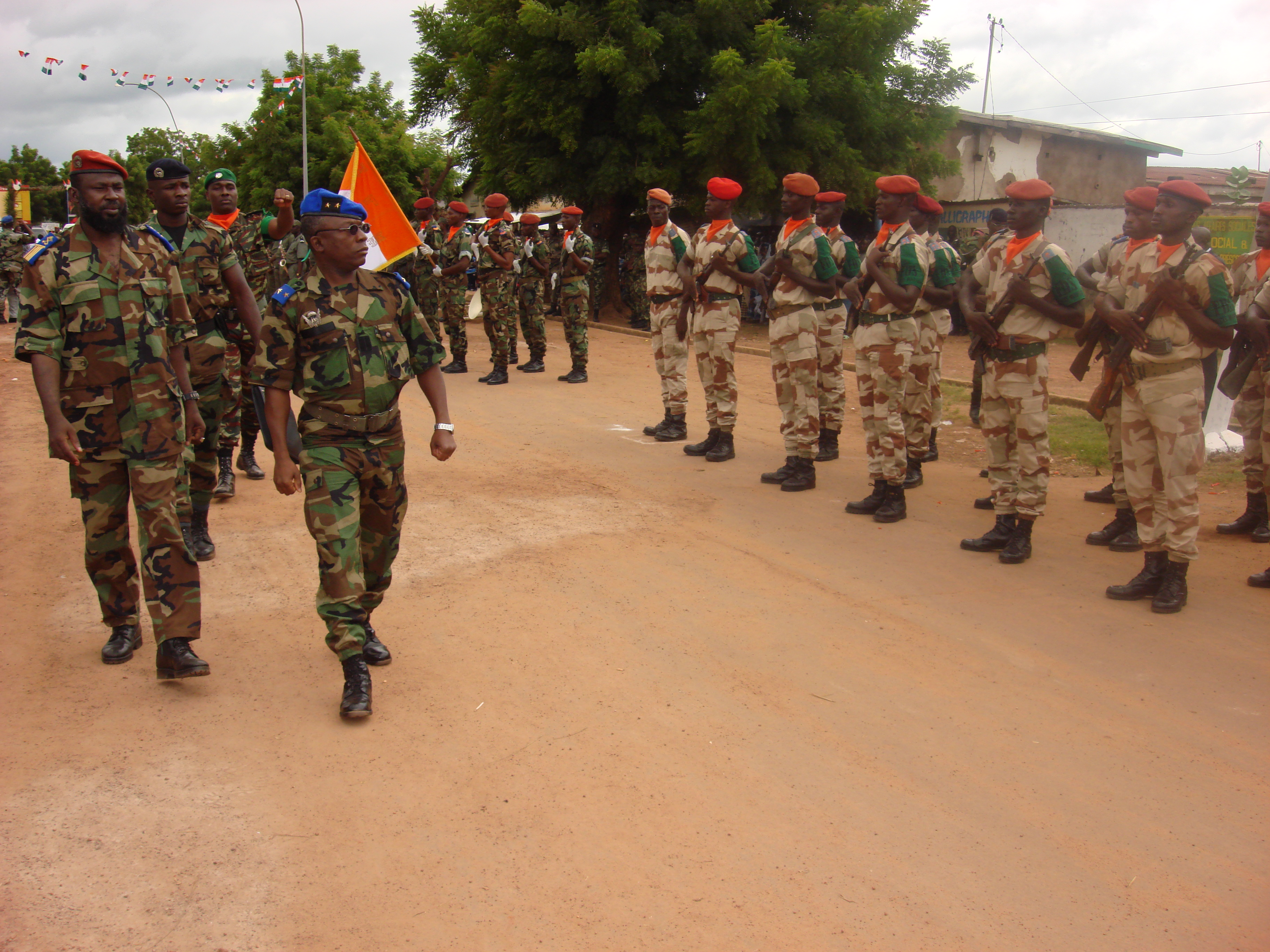
New Forces troops in Odienné.

=== ECOWAS intervention: 18 January 2003 ===
ECOWAS leaders had agreed on 18 December 2002 to deploy an ECOWAS Peace Force for Côte d'Ivoire, comprising 3,200 military personnel. The force was to arrive before the end of December and take over from France in monitoring the ceasefire. However, its deployment was delayed, and the first contingent of troops did not arrive until 18 January 2003 and consisted of only 172 soldiers. According to the International Peace Institute, the inadequacy of ECOWAS's intervention motivated France to lobby in the United Nations (UN) Security Council for a UN peacekeeping operation and, in January 2003, to spearhead peace talks.

=== Linas-Marcoussis talks: 15–26 January 2003 ===
From 15 to 26 January 2003, the various parties – government, rebel forces, and opposition political parties – met at Linas-Marcoussis, near Paris, France, to undertake substantive peace negotiations. The talks were "a French-driven initiative with inputs from regional organizations and the UN": they were chaired by Pierre Mazeaud, the chairman of the French Constitutional Council, who was assisted by Kéba Mbaye (a Senegalese judge), Seydou Diarra (former Ivorian prime minister and African Union (AU) special envoy), Mohamed Ibn Chambas (the executive secretary of ECOWAS), and Ahmedou Ould Abdallah (the Special Representative for West Africa of the UN Secretary-General). The New Forces had inherited MPCI's position in the negotiations: the rebels demanded a fresh election, viewing as illegitimate the results of the 2000 election; while the Ivorian government insisted that Gbagbo should complete his presidential term.

==== Linas-Marcoussis Accord ====
The parties signed a compromise peace agreement, the Linas-Marcoussis Accord, on 26 January. The agreement provided for power-sharing through a Government of National Reconciliation: Gbagbo would remain in office, but Seydou Diarra would be appointed as a non-partisan consensus prime minister, with the understanding that Diarra would not run in the next presidential election. The power-sharing government would include representation for all the agreement's signatories: the three major political parties (Bédié's PDCI, Ouattara's RDR, and Gbagbo's FDI), the three major rebel groups in the New Forces (MPCI, MJP, and MPIGO), and four smaller political parties – Movement of the Forces of the Future (Mouvement des forces de l'avenir), Ivorian Workers' Party (Parti ivoirien des travailleurs), Citizens' Democratic Union (Union démocratique et citoyenne), and Union for Democracy and Peace in Ivory Coast (Union pour la démocratie et la paix en Côte d'Ivoire). Most controversially, the rebels would control the important ministries of defence and the interior. The ultimate purpose of the Government of National Reconciliation was to allow credible elections to take place in 2005, and the appendix to the agreement outlined a nine-point plan for reforms to be undertaken to this end, including security sector reform, land tenure reform, and – perhaps most importantly – an end to divisive policies on citizenship, national identification, and electoral eligibility. The rebels agreed to disarm in exchange for amnesty and political representation.

The agreement received international backing. On 4 February, the UN Security Council adopted unanimously its first resolution on the Ivorian crisis, calling, in Resolution 1464, for the implementation of the peace agreement, and expressing approval of the French and ECOWAS presence in Ivory Coast. UN Secretary General Kofi Annan appointed Albert Tévoédjrè as his Special Representative in Ivory Coast.

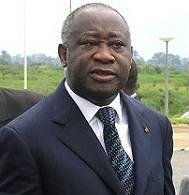
Ivorian President Laurent Gbagbo encouraged a populist uproar over the French presence in Ivory Coast.

==== "Patriotic" response ====
Inside Ivory Coast, however, FPI and government supporters regarded the Linas-Marcoussis Accord with hostility. Opposition came especially from the military, which rejected New Forces control of the interior and defence ministries and the integration of the rebels into the army. Opposition to the agreement also acquired strong overtones of anti-French sentiment: French neutrality during the early phases of Operation Licorne had already been viewed as suspect, and the Linas-Marcoussis Accord was interpreted, by its Ivorian critics, as providing confirmation that France was attempting to undermine Gbagbo's leadership. Gbagbo's supporters blamed France for coercing him to accept the agreement. Indeed, in "a clear move to distance himself" from the agreement – which he referred to as a "proposal" – Gbagbo had not signed it, but had sent another representative to sign on FPI's behalf.

Immediately after the accord was signed, the Young Patriots organised violent anti-French protests, apparently with Gbagbo's backing. A demonstration in Abidjan on 2 February drew 100,000 protesters, who objected to "French occupation" and to the power-sharing deal. The demonstrations continued on a daily basis, and at one point involved an attempt to seize the airport to prevent Diarra from returning to Abidjan to head the new coalition government. Amid attacks on French nationals, businesses, and bases, France carried out another wave of evacuations of French nationals. These protests in early 2003 marked the beginning of a surge in activity by Ivory Coast's so-called "patriotic movement", which continued to depend on mobilisation by the Young Patriots and to receive encouragement from Gbagbo, himself a longstanding nationalist. In the increasingly popular patriotic analysis, the crisis in Ivory Coast was a "war of second independence" from France's neocolonial influence, and international intervention in the crisis consisted in an attack on Ivorian sovereignty, particularly insofar as the Linas-Marcoussis Accord was viewed as recognising the legitimacy of the New Forces rebellion and as imposing constitutional change on Ivory Coast. Gbagbo was portrayed as a nationalist pioneer, persecuting for upsetting the status quo of French hegemony. In the months after Linas-Marcoussis, this narrative was used by Gbagbo to deny the legitimacy of international decisions, in favour of reasserting presidential prerogatives, and to justify his reluctance to implement the peace agreement.

== Peace implementation stalled ==
=== Accra II talks: 7–8 March 2003 ===
In a pattern that would be maintained in subsequent years, the signature of the Linas-Marcoussis Accord was followed by significant delays in its implementation, requiring the reopening of peace talks – though the Linas-Marcoussis Accord remained the basic framework within which all such talks took place between 2003 and 2006. On 7–8 March 2003, the first implementation stalemate was temporarily resolved during another summit in Accra, organised by ECOWAS and mediated by Ghanaian President John Kufuor, and therefore intended to mitigate the appearance of French domination of the peace process. The objective of the talks was to revise the power-sharing formula outlined in the Linas-Marcoussis Accord. At Accra II, the parties re-committed to implementing the initial agreement, and, to this end, the New Forces renounced its claims on the defence and interior ministries. Instead, a fifteen-member National Security Council would be established and would agree on candidates to fill those posts.

=== UN intervention: 3 May 2003 ===
The parties signed a comprehensive ceasefire on 3 May, and, the same day, the UN Security Council passed Resolution 1479, which established the UN Mission in Côte d'Ivoire (MINUCI, Mission des Nations unies en Côte d'Ivoire) to monitor implementation of the Linas-Marcoussis Accord. MINUCI was headed by, and would assist, Tévoédirè, the UN Secretary General's Special Representative. MINUCI arrived in Ivory Coast on 27 June 2003; initially comprising 34 officers, it was planned to expand to 76 personnel by the end of the year. Notwithstanding the ceasefire, "extreme violence" continued in the western part of the country, necessitating in late May a joint operation involving elements of both government and rebel forces, as well as French and ECOWAS peacekeepers.

=== End of war declared: 4 July 2003 ===
On 4 July 2003, the government and New Forces announced publicly that the civil war was over, and that they had agreed to work together to implement the peace agreement. However, the violence did not entirely dissipate. In late August, Operation Licorne suffered its first casualties when two French soldiers were killed by rebels near Sakassou. The same week, French intelligence services in Paris arrested 10 people, including Ibrahim Coulibaly, who they said had been plotting to assassinate Gbagbo and destabilise the peace. Moreover, the political conflict raged on. The New Forces refused to begin the demobilisation and disarmament process – or to allow government administrators to return to the north of the country – until Gbagbo had made permanent appointments to the sensitive ministries of defence and the interior. Gbagbo also had not fulfilled his promise to revise electoral eligibility requirements.

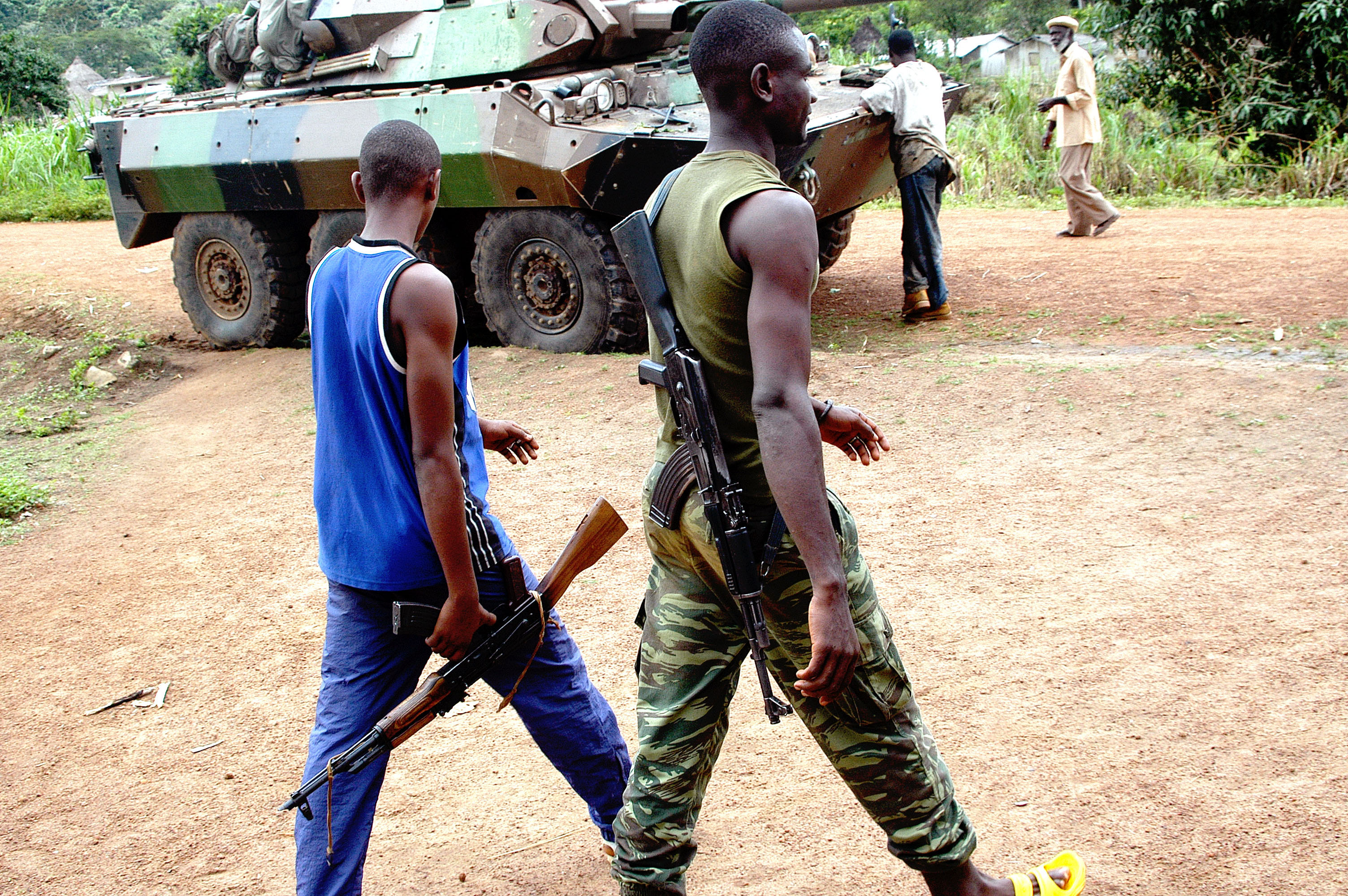
New Forces rebels with a French Foreign Legion AFV.

Progress appeared imminent by September 2003. Ivory Coast reopened its border with Burkina Faso, and the UN downgraded Ivory Coast's security rating, reflecting an improvement in conditions. On 13 September, Gbagbo finally made permanent appointments to the defence and interior portfolios. However, he declined to appoint the defence candidate proposed by the National Security Council, retired General Ouassenan Koré. Angered by this unilateral deviation from the Accra II agreement, New Forces representatives announced they would protest the move by suspending their participation in the reconciliation government. They also said that Gbagbo had refused to delegate executive powers to the prime minister and reconciliation government, as stipulated by the Linas-Marcoussis Accord, and warned that the resumption of violence was a real possibility. By the end of 2003, disarmament had not been implemented – in contravention of a 1 October deadline – and military authority in the country remained bifurcated under a de facto north-south partition, while inter-ethnic violence continued in the west, particularly between local Guéré and Yacouba. By then, over 700,000 people had been displaced in the conflict.

On 27 February 2004, the UN Security Council passed Resolution 1528, authorising the replacement of MINUCI with an ambitious peacekeeping operation, the United Nations Operation in Côte d'Ivoire (UNOCI), with a mandate to police the buffer zone between the belligerents. However, in the first half of 2004, events inside Ivory Coast did not bode well for the implementation of the Linas-Marcoussis Accord, as relations between Ivorian actors continued to deteriorate. In mid-February, Ivorian authorities issued a ministerial decree which would "Ivorianise" workplaces, requiring that companies could only hire foreigners if they submitted a plan to turn the post over to an Ivorian within two years. On 4 March, opposition party PDCI suspended its participation in the reconciliation government, accusing FPI ministers of taking unilateral decisions. On 10 March, one group of Young Patriots stormed the main Ivorian courthouse and physically attacked several magistrates; while another attacked the Hotel du Golf, the residence of the New Forces ministers. The same week, responding to violent demonstrations by students in Daloa, state forces killed one student and wounded 48 others.

=== Peace march: 25 March 2004 ===
On 25 March, opposition parties organised a public demonstration in Abidjan to call on the government to implement the Linas-Marcoussis Accord. In response, the security forces and pro-government militias opened fire on the demonstrators, while other opposition supporters were rounded up by militias in subsequent days. In May, the Office of the UN High Commissioner for Human Rights concluded an inquiry into the march and aftermath, finding that:

at least 120 people were killed, 274 wounded and 20 disappeared. These figures are by no means final... It is equally clear that many of the killings on these two days did not take place in the street but in the dwellings of would-be demonstrators or even innocent civilians targeted by the security forces simply because of their name, origin or community group. It was a well-known fact that police officers or other security officials or parallel forces would harass, try to rob, or search and arrest without warrants people in Abidjan even in the days preceding 25 March. However, these activities had greatly intensified since 23 March and contributed to the explosive environment. Credible accounts received by the Commission indicate that these actions too had been planned and directed by the security forces and later executed in cooperation and collusion with the parallel forces.

In protest against the violence, the New Forces and Ouattara's RDR announced their withdrawal from the reconciliation government. In May, Gbagbo publicly lambasted the opposition for suspending their participation; shortly afterwards, it was announced that he had sacked (permanently) three opposition ministers: PDCI's Patrick Achi, the New Forces' Youssouff Soumahoro, and Soro, the leader of the New Forces. Soro called the move "tantamount to a coup d'état against the peace accords", and said that it would be impossible to establish peace in Ivory Coast until Gbagbo was removed from office.

=== Accra III talks: July 2004 ===
Peace talks resumed in July 2004 in Accra in an attempt to revitalise the peace process. An agreement signed upon the conclusion of the talks once again committed the parties to implement the Linas-Marcoussis Accord, this time "with specific deadlines and benchmarks for progress". The talks focused on addressing key obstacles to the peace process – notably electoral eligibility, citizenship reform, and the disarmament programme. The rebels agreed to rejoin the reconciliation government, and Gbagbo agreed to revise article 35 of the constitution, which until then had disqualified Ouattara from standing in presidential elections.

However, by October, it was apparent that the Accra III agreement had not broken the implementation deadlock: on 12 October, Gbagbo announced that he would not submit the revised article 35 for National Assembly approval until after the rebels had disarmed; the rebels announced, in response, that they would not disarm until real progress had been made towards credible elections. The New Forces therefore missed the October 15 deadline to begin disarmament, and in early November, as tensions mounted, they formally refused to disarm. By then, the New Forces had imposed a state of emergency in their territories, claiming to have found weaponry hidden in a commercial truck – which they said was a delivery from Gbagbo's forces to Soro's internal rivals in the north – and warning that "the war isn't over yet. It is going to resume shortly". A sustained assault on the press followed, with newspapers partial to the north being banned and two presses destroyed; dissenting radio stations were silenced.

== Resurgence of violence ==
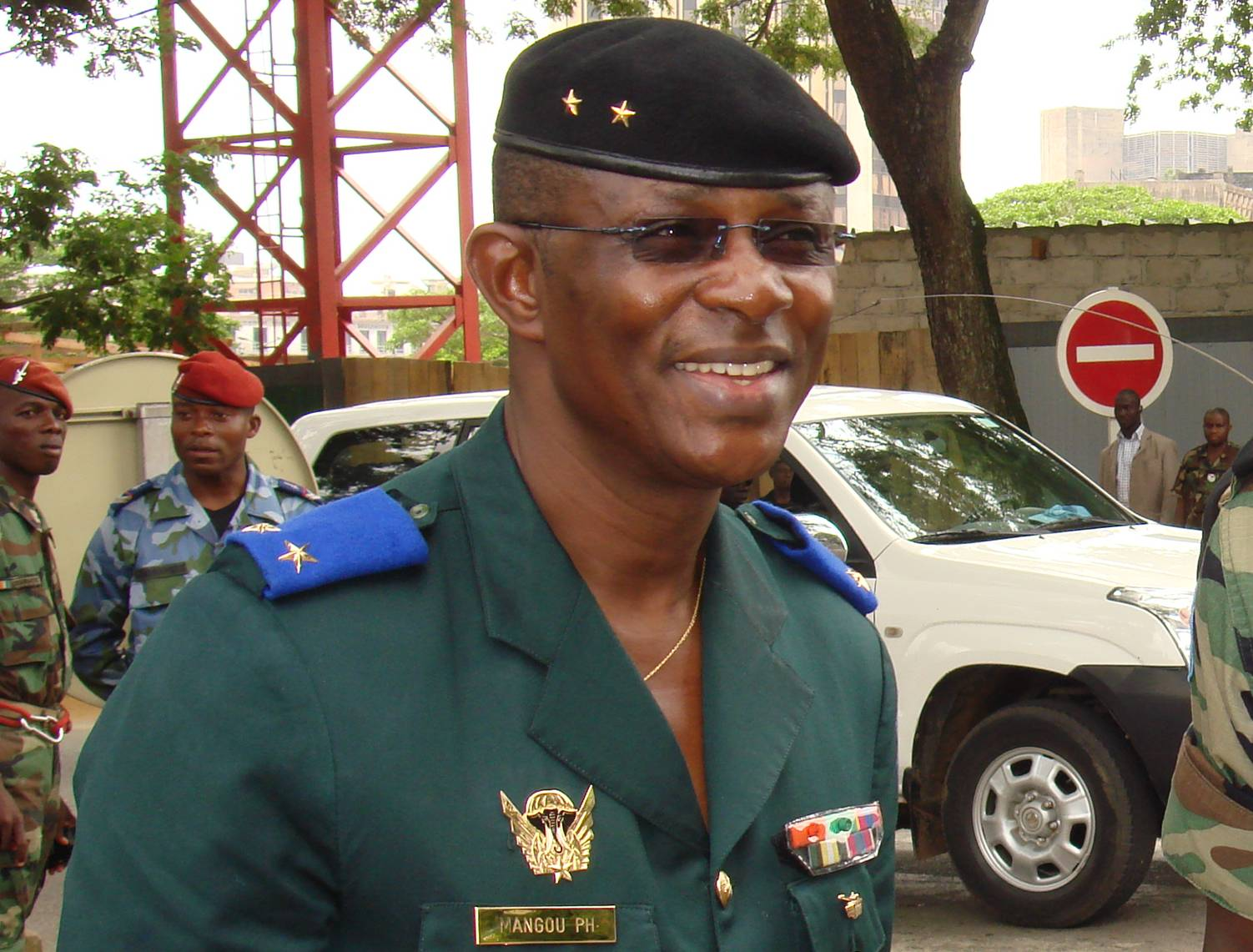
Philippe Mangou was head of the Ivorian Armed Forces for the duration of the war.

On 4 November, Gbagbo's forces violated the prevailing ceasefire, as the military launched air attacks against rebel positions in Bouaké and Korhogo. The Young Patriots launched another attack on New Forces residences at the Hotel du Golf, expelling Prime Minister Diarra. After the attacks, Soro of the New Forces declared the Linas-Marcoussis Accord and subsequent Accra agreements "null and void".

=== French–Ivorian violence clashes: November 2004 ===
On 6 November, one or two Ivorian Sukhoi Su-25 bombed an Operation Licorne base in Bouaké, killing nine French soldiers and an American aid worker and injuring 31 others, the heaviest casualties suffered by a French operation since the 1983 Beirut barrack bombings. France rejected the Ivorian claim that the bombing had been accidental, and French President Jacques Chirac ordered the retaliatory destruction of both Ivorian Sukhoi Su-25 and five MI-24 ground attack helicopters – the entirety of the Ivorian air force's fleet. The French–Ivorian clashes which followed represented "a new peak" in the conflict and threatened to derail the peace process entirely, as pro-Gbagbo youths rioted against the French response and looted French-owned businesses, triggering yet another wave of Western evacuations: in two weeks, some 9,000 expatriates left the country. On 7 November, French forces opened fire on rioters in Abidjan, killing between 20 and 60 people according to French and Ivorian estimates respectively.

The clashes strengthened the pro-Gbagbo "patriotic" narrative that the conflict involved a "second war of independence" from France. On 13 November, Mamadou Coulibaly, the President of the Ivorian National Assembly, declared that the government of the Ivory Coast did not take any responsibility for the 6 November bombardment, and announced that the government intended to approach the International Court of Justice to hold France responsible for its destruction of Ivorian air force equipment and for the deaths that the French response had caused. In 2016, a French judicial investigation recommended that three French ministers – Michel Barnier, Dominique de Villepin and Michèle Alliot-Marie – be referred for prosecution for allegedly having obstructed an investigation into the initial Ivorian air raid. In 2021, a Paris court issued life sentences to two Ivorian officers and one Belarusian mercenary, who in absentia had been found guilty of carrying out the air raid.

== Revived peace talks ==
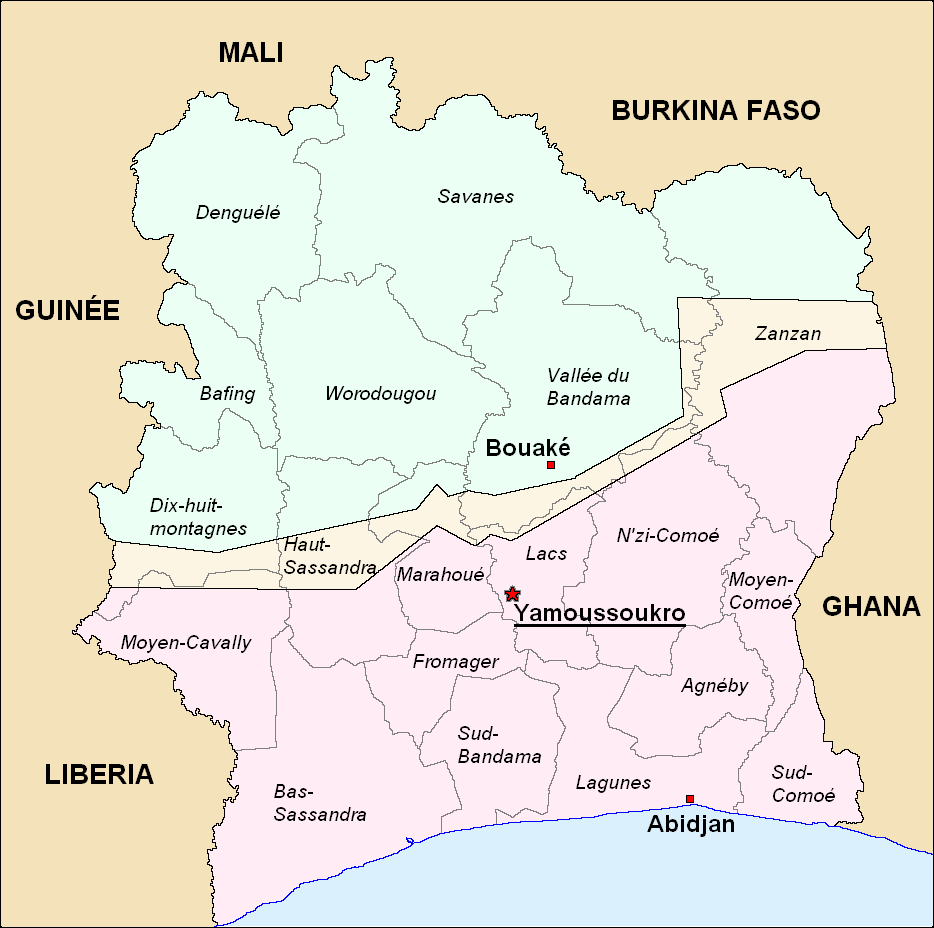
A map of the buffer zone (zone de confiance) created in Ivory Coast, as of spring 2007.

The UN Security Council passed Resolution 1572 on 15 November, imposing an immediate arms embargo on Ivory Coast, though the effectiveness of the embargo is debatable. It also authorised targeted sanctions on Ivorian spoilers, and threatened to impose such sanctions if the belligerents did not return to peace negotiations timeously.

=== Pretoria talks: April–June 2005 ===
On 3 to 6 April 2005, South African President Thabo Mbeki chaired peace talks in Pretoria, South Africa, arranged under African Union (AU) auspices with the intention of reviving the peace process. The resulting Pretoria Agreement, intended as a supplement to the Linas-Marcoussis Accord, established a cessation of hostilities and ended the state of war. Mbeki had been involved in the Accra III talks, and, by acknowledging Gbagbo's concerns about Ivorian sovereignty, was able to nudge Gbagbo to a deal on sensitive electoral issues – notably the eligibility in elections of all peace talk participants, including Ouattara; and international supervision of the next Ivorian elections. In June, the UN Security Council passed Resolution 1603, calling on the UN Secretary-General to prepare to fulfil that supervisory role. Gbagbo also agreed to increase opposition representation on the Independent Electoral Commission and to disband pro-government militias. The New Forces and opposition parties mistrusted Mbeki, viewing him as a biased mediator, but did agree once again to disarm and to rejoin the reconciliation government. Rebel forces started to withdraw heavy weapons from the front line on 21 April, re-establishing the buffer zone, and the parties met in Pretoria again in June 2005 to review and reaffirm the agreement.

=== Further delays: 2005–2006 ===
Nonetheless, and possibly due to intentional delays by Gbagbo, election preparations were slow, even as the end of Gbagbo's five-year presidential term – 30 October 2005, according to the constitution – approached. In early September, both the New Forces and the opposition parties said that elections held on 30 October as planned would not be free and fair. In early October, the AU's Peace and Security Council conceded that Gbagbo could remain in office for up to 12 months further. Despite objections from the PDCI and RDR, as well as its two smaller partners in the opposition Houphouëtist alliance, the UN Security Council followed suit. On 21 October, the Security Council adopted Resolution 1633, which called for the establishment of an international ministerial working group and mediation group – mandated to draw up a road map for holding elections – and demanded the appointment, by consensus, of a new prime minister in Ivory Coast. Following a delay, both directives were implemented, with Charles Konan Banny appointed the new prime minister in December 2005. On 15 December, the Security Council's Resolution 1643 extended the arms embargo and established a new ban against the trade of Ivorian diamonds, marginally affecting the revenues of the New Forces. Although two Young Patriots leaders and one New Forces commander were subject to UN targeted sanctions (a travel ban and asset freezes), the main protagonists avoided such measures; among other factors, discord had emerged in the African regional response, as the AU Peace and Security Council – and South Africa individually – opposed the coercive measures which ECOWAS favoured.

At this stage, the security situation – even around the buffer zone – remained unstable, obstructing UNOCI's movement and operations. In mid-January 2006, UN bases in Abidjan, Daloa, Guiglo, and San-Pédro were besieged by thousands of pro-government demonstrators, after the Young Patriots took over the Ivorian state-run radio and television stations and sent out a call for civilians to attack UNOCI and the French. The New York Times reported that four people had died in the clashes. In early November 2006, the UN Security Council agreed to delay elections further, extending Gbagbo and Banny's terms for another "new and final" transition period of one year. Resolution 1721, lobbied for by France, also strengthened the powers of Prime Minister Banny, leading Gbagbo to warn that he would not carry out UN directives which were inconsistent with the Ivorian constitution.

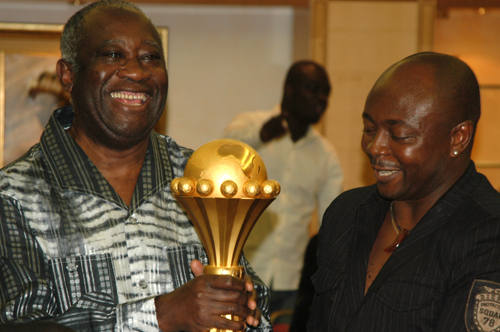
Gbagbo with Ghanaian footballer Abedi Pele, December 2007.

During this period, the Ivorian national football team was credited with boosting national reconciliation. In 2007, the team qualified for the 2008 African Cup of Nations in a game held in rebel-held Bouaké and attended by troops from both sides; similarly, in October 2005, the team's qualification for the 2006 FIFA World Cup sparked days of public celebration in Abidjan, and on some accounts was responsible for persuading the government and rebels to recommit to peace negotiations.

=== Ouagadougou talks: 2006–2007 ===
Shortly after the UN Security Council adopted Resolution 1721, Gbagbo announced that he was preparing his own "new framework" to resolve the crisis, reflecting that, "Confronted by the failure of external solutions, it is time for Ivorians to assume total ownership of the peace process". The new framework revolved around "direct dialogue" between the New Forces and Gbagbo's FPI, to be undertaken bilaterally without international mediation. Bilateral pre-negotiations had in fact been underway in secret since mid-2006.

Although touted as a "home-grown" solution, the talks were facilitated by Burkinabé President Blaise Compaoré, with ECOWAS's endorsement, and Mbeki had also been involved in the pre-negotiations. None of the opposition parties were invited to participate, and Gbagbo and Soro held direct talks alone for the first time.

==== Ouagadougou Peace Agreement ====
On 4 March 2007, the parties – the FPI government and the New Forces – signed the Ouagadougou Peace Agreement in Ouagadougou, Burkina Faso, their eighth peace agreement since 2002. The agreement, which represented a comprehensive political settlement to the conflict, entailed a new power-sharing arrangement, abandoning the notion of a consensus prime minister: instead, Soro was to become prime minister (thus marginalising opposition leaders Ouattara and Bédié) – but Gbagbo's constitutional prerogatives as president were also to be re-established. The agreement also implied a reduce role for international supervision: several international monitoring mechanisms agreed to after the Pretoria talks (including the establishment of a UN High Representative for the Election in Côte d'Ivoire) were eliminated, although the UN Secretary General's Special Representative retained the right to certify the electoral process. The agreement included mechanisms to expedite voter registration and identification so that a presidential election could be held in ten months. It also included provisions for the disarmament of combatants and, through a joint command centre, for the restructuring of the military and security forces.

==== Implementation ====
Soro took office in early April, and formed a cabinet that retained many of the ministers who had served under his predecessor. On 16 April, Gbagbo declared that the war was over, as he, with Soro, presided over the first steps to dismantle the UNOCI buffer zone, an occasion celebrated by a joint parade of government and New Forces troops. On 18 June, the central government began its administrative redeployment in northern areas formerly held by rebels, with the first new prefect installed in Bouaké. Despite a fatal rocket attack on Soro's airplane on 30 June, the reconciliation process continued with the large "Peace Flame" disarmament ceremony on 30 July, in which the two leaders set fire to a pile of weapons, symbolising the end of the conflict. The ceremony also involved Gbagbo's first visit, since 2002, to the former rebel stronghold of Bouaké.

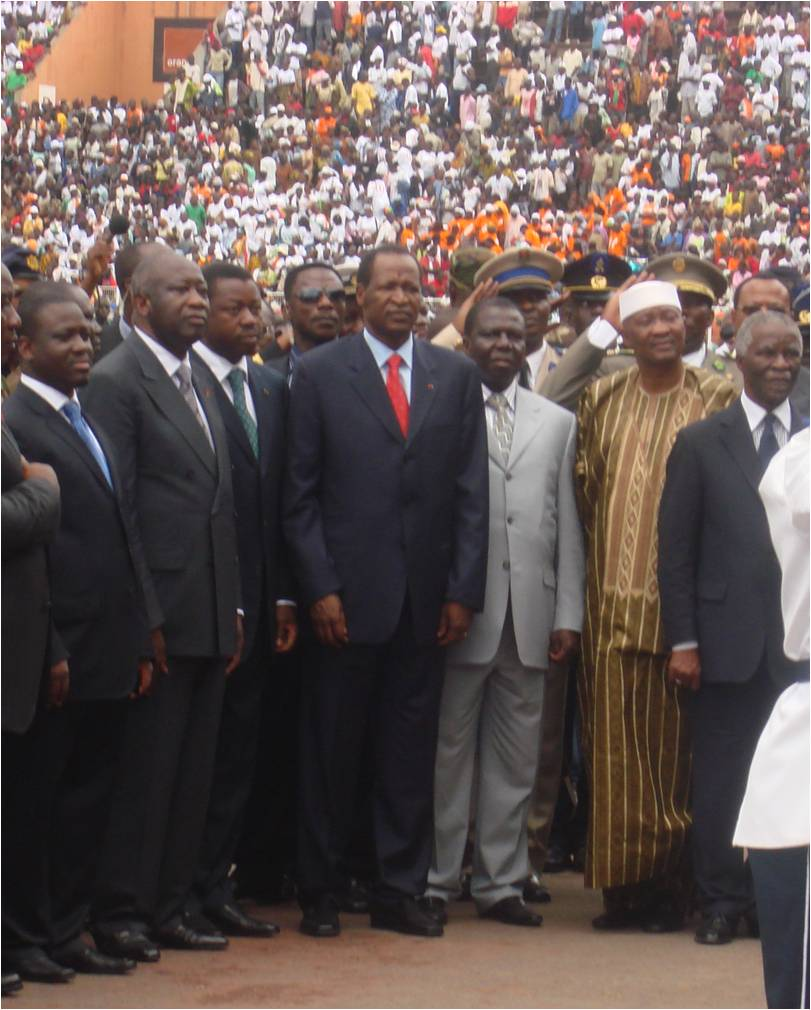
African heads of state with Gbagbo and Soro at the Peace Flame ceremony, 30 July 2007.

On 27 November, Gbagbo and Soro met with Compaoré in Ouagadougou to discuss the implementation of the Ouagadougou Peace Agreement and set a deadline for elections. In late December, they met again, this time in Tiébissou to preside over the beginning of a nation-wide disarmament process, scheduled to unfold over three months as troops from both sides left the front and returned to barracks. When the buffer zone was fully dismantled in July 2008, it was replaced by a "green line" of international peacekeepers, split across seventeen observation points, who would gradually be replaced by joint Ivorian patrols including both New Forces and government troops. Disarmament and demobilisation encountered several hurdles. Opposition politicians Ouattara and Bédié expressed opposition to the sequencing of disarmament, suggesting that elections should take place first, while there were occasional riots by contingents of ex-rebels who demanded payment (or augmentation) of the demobilisation payments they had been promised by the new government. France, Japan, and the United States announced in May 2009 that they would make funds available to cover the election costs and the costs of the disarmament payments.

Preparations for the presidential election began in 2007, with Sagem, a French company, hired to administer the voters' roll; but, in October 2008, the New Forces suggested postponing the election for no more than a year, in order to provide more time for voter registration. In early November 2008, several Ivorian parties – including Gbagbo, Soro, Bédié, and Ouattara – met in Ouagadougou and agreed to postpone; the UN Security Council called for elections to be held no later than mid-2009. Despite an announcement in May 2009 that the election would be held on November 29, it did not take place until October 2010.

== Impact ==
According to 2009 estimates by the Uppsala Conflict Data Program, in its deadliest years between 2002 and 2004, the war had between 933 and 1,689 casualties, with a best guess of 1,265 casualties. UNOCI suffered 36 casualties during the war: fifteen in 2005, thirteen in 2006, and eight in 2007. According to the UN Refugee Agency, approximately 750,000 people were forcibly displaced between 2002 and 2007, including 50,000 refugees who fled primarily to Liberia, Guinea, and Mali.

== Aftermath: Return to war ==
Ivory Coast held its first presidential elections since 2000 in October 2010, but a dispute over the result led to renewed political crisis and to the beginning of the Second Ivorian Civil War. Soro did not run in the election, nor did the New Forces endorse a candidate. The Independent Electoral Commission declared Ouattara the winner, a result endorsed by international observers, but was contradicted in this respect by the Constitutional Council; both Gbagbo and Ouattara claimed victory and took the presidential oath of office. Hundreds of people were killed in the violence that followed, and hundreds of thousands were displaced. UN Security Council Resolution 1962 extended UNOCI's mandate and called on all parties to recognise Ouattara as Ivory Coast's rightful president. The second civil war ended with Gbagbo's defeat and arrest in April 2011, but, despite its brevity, had a higher death toll than the first: a 2012 national commission of inquiry recorded 3,248 fatalities.

== See also ==
- Simone Gbagbo
- France–Ivory Coast relations
- Belarusian mercenaries in Ivory Coast
