= Ivory Coast and the International Monetary Fund =

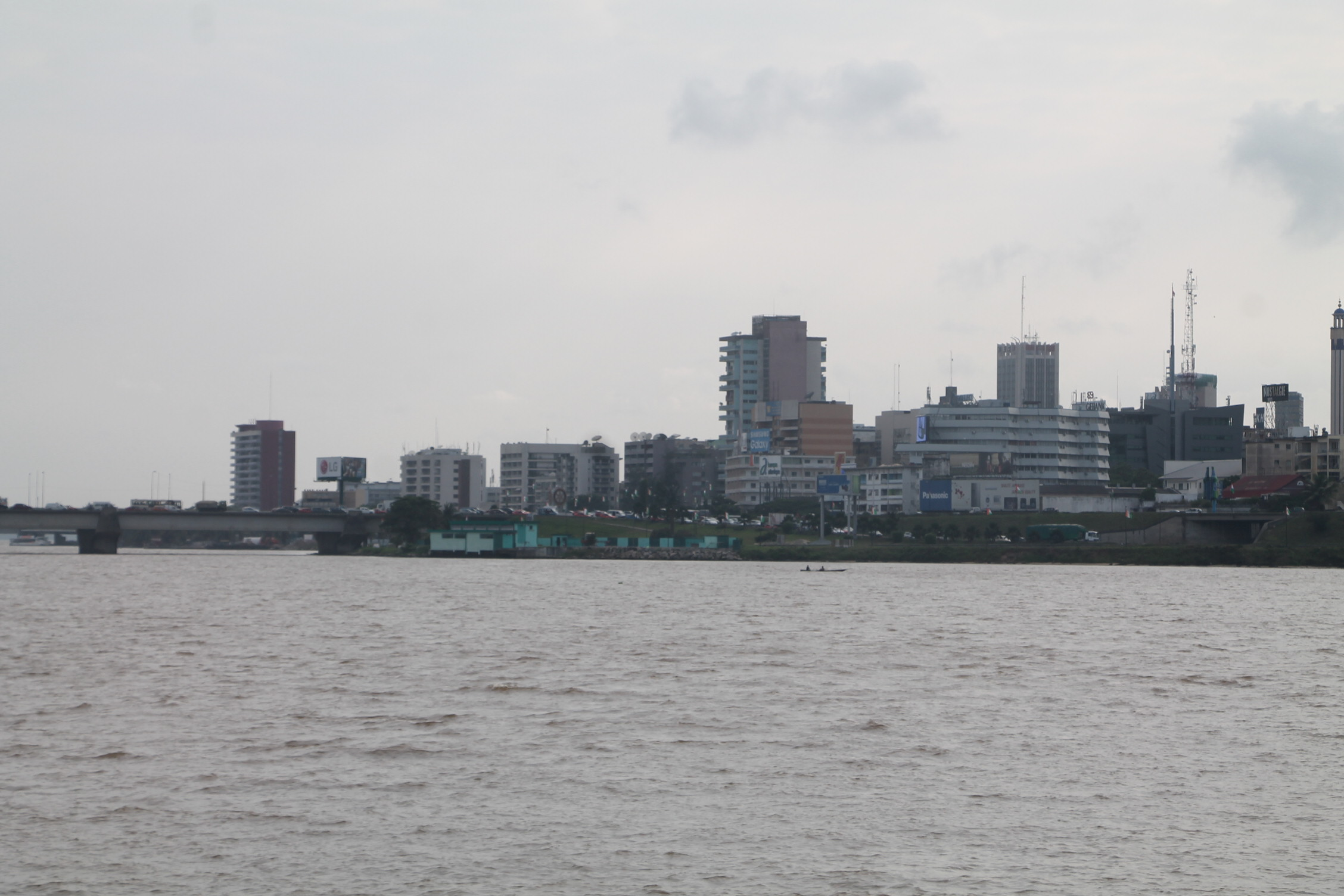
Skyline of Abidjan, Côte d'Ivoire's capital

With the world’s largest production of cacao and cashew nuts, Ivory Coast (Côte d’Ivoire) is one of the leading economic powers in West Africa. It joined the IMF in 1963. Since then, Ivory Coast participated in 14 arrangements and purchased more than 1016 millions in procurement and loans. It now possesses 650.4 million SDR of quotas.

Synthetic Financial Position in the IMF
General Resources Account	SDR Million	Percentage of Quota
Quota	650.40	100
IMF's Holdings of Currency (Holdings Rate)	936.71	144.02
Outstanding Purchases and Loans:		
ECF Arrangements	600.14	92.27
Extended Arrangements	369.08	56.75

According to the IMF's Finance Department.

== Background on the Ivorian Political and Economic Context ==
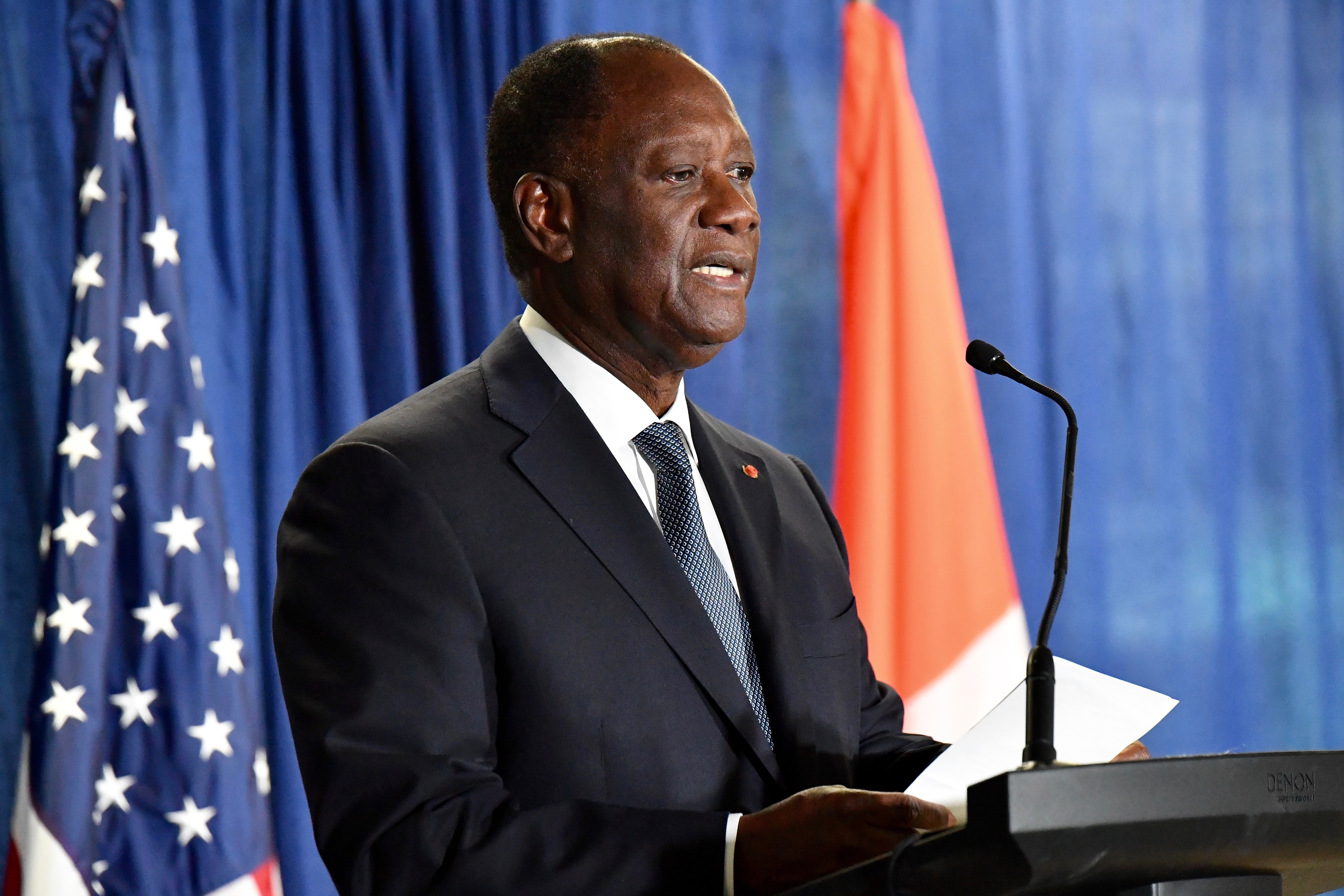
Alassane Ouattara, Ivory Coast's current President

From its independence from France, Ivory Coast developed a relatively stable and prosperous economy centred on the production and export of commodities such as cacao and coffee, and a network of clientelistic relations. Ivory Coast's first President, Félix Houphouët-Boigny, developed an economic system founded on the extraction and redistribution of agricultural rents, mainly coming from the cocoa-coffee industry. Nevertheless, the 1970s global monetary shocks and the drop in value of basic commodities in international markets induced the Ivorian government to borrow extensively. Ivory Coast's growing problem with foreign deficit eventually led to the intervention of France, and later on the IMF, to stabilize the economy. In the 1990s, with the encouragement of the IMF, Ivory Coast implemented nationwide monetary and macroeconomic reforms targeting clientelistic networks and reducing the role of the state in the economy. However, in 2000, following the controversial election of Laurent Gbagbo, a civil war split the country between the Muslim rebel-held North and the Government controlled Christian South, leading to large-scale violence and instability. As a result of the 2007 peace agreement, elections took place in 2010, which declared Alassane Ouattara winner. Gbagbo’s refusal to leave power triggered post-elections violence, but with Ouattara’s mandates, Ivory Coast went back to relative political and economic stability. The Ivorian economy indeed expanded by an average of 8% since the end of the political crisis in 2011, making Ivory Coast one of the fastest growing economies in West Africa.

== Specificity of the Zone Franc and Distance from the IMF until the 1980s ==
Map of the CFA Franc Zone

Ivory Coast is in the CFA Franc Zone, a former French colonial monetary zone created in 1939, which now gathers 14 Sub-Saharan countries using the CFA Franc. Following the Second World War, French authorities reformed the CFA and fixed its convertibility to the metropolitan Franc. As a result of decolonization, the CFA was further reformed with the creation of two monetary zones and their respective Central Banks, which got to control 35% of the reserves while 65% remained in the French Treasury. Owing to these monetary arrangements, France was able to remain the primary financial backer in its former African colonies. Indeed, the CFA arrangements enabled French authorities to directly finance external deficits and impose some soft disinflationary adjustments, which dissuaded former colonies to go toward the IMF’s harsher lending conditions.

== The 1980s Structural Changes ==
As a result of the drop in value of agricultural products in international markets in the late 1970s, the indebtedness that resulted from monetary shocks, and the failure of the cacao war, Ivorian authorities agreed with the IMF on a first program of structural adjustment in 1981. The main objective of the reforms was to break down the clientelistic practices corroding the Ivorian economy. To do so, the IMF promoted privatization, in particular in the agricultural industries formerly administered by the state. Thus, in 2000, Caistab, the state-firm controlling the cacao-coffee industry, was liquidated. Scholars have argued that at the time Ivory Coast was lacking the legal institutions necessary to enable the switch from a national monopoly to a neoliberal system fully opened to international multinationals. The structural changes affected former interest structures, and the ending of the state's protection of domestic industries made small-scale peasants vulnerable to international competition. The resulting social instability participated in triggering the nationwide movement of peasants’ riots and demonstrations that spread across the country in 2004.

== Broader effects of lending and conditionality of the IMF programs ==
The IMF’s structural adjustment programs in Ivory Coast have involved privatization waves, including the privatization of the cacao industry, Ivory Coast's top export industry. Opening the industry to foreign competition pressured farmers to increase output. This need for increased production was accompanied by an intensification in the illegal exploitation of children. In 2002, approximately 15,000 children were working on Ivorian cocoa, coffee, and cotton farms. Structural adjustment programs also required the government to reduce public spending in order to reduce budget deficit. User fees were introduced into the health care system, which became more and more privately funded. In 2011, 65% of health care expenditure in Ivory Coast was financed by private households’ out of pocket payments. Furthermore, education budgets were cut, leading to decreases in civic servants’ wages. Many highly skilled professors left Ivory Coast for better employment opportunities in France or Canada, triggering a ‘brain drain’ movement. In 2009, 30,7% of Ivorians residing abroad were high-educated individuals, and 49,8% were residing in France.

== Recent IMF programs: The EFF/ECF lending arrangements ==
The Extended Fund Facility (EFF) and Extended Credit Facility (ECF) are two lending arrangements. The ECF provides medium and long-term sustained program engagement for countries with balance of payments problems. The EFF provides assistance to countries experiencing payments imbalances because of structural impediments or a slow growth and a weak balance of payments position. The three-year ECF/EFF arrangements in Ivory Coast were first approved by the IMF Executive Board in December 2016 with a total access of SDR 650.4 million, equivalent to 100 percent of Ivory Coast’s quota. In June 2019, the IMF’s Executive Board completed its fifth reviews under the ECF/EFF arrangements, and agreed to the immediate disbursement of additional SDR 96.786 million, bringing current disbursements to SDR 553.6 million. In Ivory Coast, the ECF/EFF arrangements consist mainly in macroeconomic policies and structural reforms aiming to increase tax revenue mobilization in order to address infrastructure needs and reduce budget deficit. They also include fiscal reforms aimed at consolidating Ivory Coast’s banking sector and making its business climate more inclusive for private investment. Ivory Coast has been relatively successful in implementing these reforms as all performance criteria were met in 2018. Moreover, all but one indicative target were met at end-2018, and five out of six structural benchmarks were also met.

== Current Economic Situation and Relation with the IMF ==
In October 2019, the IMF staff completed a mission to evaluate Ivory Coast's current economic climate and completion of IMF programs. The report emphasized the resilience and strength of the Ivorian economy in the last few years, despite a deteriorating external environment. It evaluated the performance of Ivorian authorities under IMF-supported programs and highlighted that Ivory Coast met all performance criteria for end-June 2019, and all but one of the structural benchmarks on public finance management, public enterprise monitoring, and tax policy and administration. The report acknowledged Ivory Coast's encouraging position regarding the reduction of its budget deficit to 3.0% of GDP, as well as efforts to restructure the public sector and diversify exports. Moreover, it confirmed the one-year program expansion of fiscal policy measures to 2020 in order for Ivory Coast to meet the 3.0 percent of GDP deficit objective. It also formalized the IMF's agreement with national authorities to continue domestic revenue mobilization efforts and the implementation of policies to create space to finance the National Development Program (2016 - 2020), a national development plan aimed at consolidating Ivory Coast's industrial sector and reduce poverty.

Ivory Coast: Selected Economic Indicators 2017-21
	2017	2018	2019	2020 (projection)	2021 (projection)
GDP Growth (%)	7,7	7,4	7,5	7,2	7,0
Current Expenditure (% of GDP)	18,0	17,3	16,6	17	16,9
Public Debt (% of GDP)	49,8	51,8	50,5	49,7	48,9

According to the IMF's Country Report No. 18/367.
