= United Nations Mission in Côte d'Ivoire =

- Abbreviation: MINUCI
- Formation: 13 May 2003
- Type: Peacekeeping Mission
- Legal status: Succeeded by UNOCI 4 April 2004
- Parent organization: United Nations Security Council

The United Nations Mission in Côte d'Ivoire (French: Mission des Nations unies en Côte d'Ivoire, MINUCI) was a peacekeeping mission whose objective was to facilitate the implementation of the Linas-Marcoussis Agreement, as well as establishing a military component to complement "the operations of the French and ECOWAS forces" in Côte d'Ivoire. The mission was established by United Nations Security Council Resolution 1479 on 13 May 2003. The mission was succeeded by the United Nations Operation in Côte d'Ivoire (UNOCI) on 4 April 2004.

== History ==
The First Ivorian Civil War began in September 2002. In response to defense agreements with Côte d'Ivoire, dating back to independence, France deployed a military force under Opération Licorne. The Economic Community of West African States (ECOWAS) also deployed a military force the ECOWAS Mission in Côte d'Ivoire (ECOMICI). These two military forces were to serve as peacekeepers and were later tasked to keep the factions of the civil war separated while the January 2003 Linas-Marcoussis Agreement was implemented. In May 2003, the United Nations Security Council determined that the conflict in Côte d'Ivoire continued to be a threat to international peace and security and passed United Nations Security Council Resolution 1479 establishing the United Nations Mission in Côte d'Ivoire. This mission was to complement the mission of the existing French and ECOWAS forces.
