= United Nations Security Council Resolution 1633 =

UN Security Council Resolution 1633
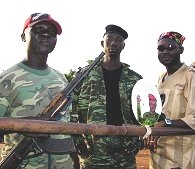
- Rebels in Côte d'Ivoire
- Date: 21 October 2005
- Meeting no.: 5,288
- Code: S/RES/1633 (Document)
- Subject: The situation in Côte d'Ivoire
- Voting summary: 15 voted for; None voted against; None abstained
- Result: Adopted

Security Council composition
- Permanent members: China; France; Russia; United Kingdom; United States
- Non-permanent members: Algeria; Argentina; Benin; Brazil; Denmark; Greece; Japan; Philippines; Romania; Tanzania

United Nations Security Council resolution 1633, adopted unanimously on 21 October 2005, after recalling previous resolutions on the situation in Côte d'Ivoire (Ivory Coast), the Council demanded the implementation of the Linas-Marcoussis, Accra III and Pretoria peace agreements by the signatories to those accords, as well as all relevant Ivorian parties concerned.

== Resolution ==
=== Observations ===
In the preamble of the resolution, the Council reaffirmed its support of all peace agreements to end the civil war. It expressed concern at the ongoing situation in Côte d'Ivoire and its deterioration, and condemned all violations of human rights.

=== Acts ===
Acting under Chapter VII of the United Nations Charter, the Council commended the role of the Economic Community of West African States (ECOWAS) and the African Union in Côte d'Ivoire. It noted that the term of incumbent President Laurent Gbagbo was to end and that presidential elections could not take place due to the situation, thus his term could continue, but for no more than twelve months, and all peace agreements had to be implemented. However, more than a year later, Gbagbo remained in power. A new Prime Minister – approved by all Ivorian parties – had to be appointed by 31 October 2005. After a delay until 7 December 2005, Charles Konan Banny was appointed.

The resolution reiterated that all ministers should be able to participate in the government and that the prime minister was to have all necessary powers contained within the Linas-Marcoussis agreement including defense, security and electoral matters and functioning of the government. All Ivorian parties were urged to refrain from hindering the tasks of the prime minister.

The council made further demands for all Ivorian parties to end incitement to violence through the media and the use of force, and for the Forces Nouvelles and militia to begin the disarmament, demobilisation and reintegration programme. Neighbouring countries were urged to prevent the cross-border movements of combatants and weapons into Côte d'Ivoire. Furthermore, violations of human rights and attacks on United Nations Operation in Côte d'Ivoire (UNOCI) personnel were condemned.

Finally, the council declared that it would take further action against any person or organisation that would hinder the peace process.

== See also ==
- Ivorian Civil War
- List of United Nations Security Council Resolutions 1601 to 1700 (2005–2006)
- United Nations Operation in Côte d'Ivoire
