= Kéba Mbaye =

Senegalese judge

Kéba Mbaye (5 August 1924 – 11 January 2007) was a Senegalese judge and member of both the International Olympic Committee and the International Court of Justice.

Mbaye was born in Kaolack, French Senegal on 5 August 1924. He was a member of the International Olympic Committee from 1973 to 2002. An associate of Juan Antonio Samaranch, he served as IOC vice-president from 1988 to 1992, member of the executive board from 1984 to 1988 and 1993 to 1998, and chair of its ethics commission since 1999. He also served as president of the Court of Arbitration for Sport, the highest Olympic tribunal.

Mbaye helped in bringing South Africa from Olympic exile after the apartheid era. Later, at the height of the Salt Lake City bid scandal, Samaranch appointed him to chair a new ethics commission to police the conduct of fellow IOC members. He also headed the IOC panel on legal matters.

A legal scholar, Mbaye served as vice-president of the International Court of Justice and was Honorary Chief Justice of the Supreme Court of Senegal from 1964 to 1982. Mbaye was President of the International Commission of Jurists from 1977 to 1985 and Commissioner from 1972 to 1987. His published legal works include The Realities of the Black World and Human Rights; Family Law in Black Africa and Madagascar; and Human Rights in Africa. The International Olympic Committee and South Africa, Analysis and Illustration of a humanitarian sport policy.

Mbaye married Mariette Diarra in 1950 and had eight children. He died on 11 January 2007 in Dakar, Senegal. Upon his death, IOC President Jacques Rogge released this statement: "Keba Mbaye was one of those men whose humanity and charisma mark you for life. His devotion to the Olympic movement and its values was unfailing. We have lost a great man."
