= Ivoirité =

Common cultural identity of Ivory Coast residents

The word Ivoirité (French pronunciation: [i.vwa.ʁi.te]; sometimes translated into English as Ivoirity) entered the social and political lexicon of Ivory Coast during the presidency of Henri Konan Bédié (1993–1999). It was used as a descriptor of the purported intrinsic characteristics of an indigenous Ivorian, in contrast to immigrants. During Bedie's presidency, ethnic tensions rose sharply, with growing attacks on foreign workers and a widening rift between the country's predominantly Muslim north and mainly Christian south.

Before the 1995 presidential election, a law drafted by Bédié and upheld by the Supreme Court required both parents of a candidate to be born in the Ivory Coast. This led to the disqualification of the opposition candidate Alassane Ouattara, who claimed to represent the predominantly Muslim north, often poor migrant labourers from Mali and Burkina Faso working on coffee and cocoa plantations. His father had long been rumoured to have been born in Burkina Faso. Ouattara, an economist who worked for the IMF, was the prime minister of Ivory Coast under President Félix Houphouët-Boigny, from 1990 until 1993.

The word Ivoirité is associated with the Second Ivorian Civil War (2010–2011), in which at least 3,000 civilians were killed.
