= Movement for Justice and Peace =

Rebel group and political party in Ivory Coast

The Movement for Justice and Peace (Mouvement pour la justice et la paix MJP) is one of two rebel groups from the west of Côte d'Ivoire, which took part in the Ivorian Civil War. The MJP was estimated to have 250 men under arms, commanded by Gaspard Déli, when it signed a ceasefire on 8 January 2003. Since 2004 the MJP has been a political party, functioning as a junior partner to the Patriotic Movement of Côte d'Ivoire (MPCI) in the Forces Nouvelles de Côte d'Ivoire coalition led by Guillaume Soro. After joining the MPCI it has dropped out of public view.

== See also ==
- Politics of Côte d'Ivoire
- Ivorian Civil War
