= Ivorian Popular Movement of the Great West =

Rebel movement and political party in Ivory Coast

The Ivorian Popular Movement of the Great West (Mouvement populaire ivoirien du Grand Ouest; MPIGO). One of two rebel movements in the west of Côte d'Ivoire, created to reinforce the rebel presence after the Marcoussis accords. Founded by sergent Félix Doh (killed April 2003 in an ambush), MPIGO recruited mostly in the ethnically libéro-ivoirienne Dan/Yacouba speaking region. MPIGO had some 6000 men under arms when it signed a ceasefire on 8 January 2003. Since 2004 MPIGO has been a political party, functioning as a junior partner to the Patriotic Movement of Côte d'Ivoire (MPCI) in the Forces Nouvelles de Côte d'Ivoire coalition led by Guillaume Soro.

== See also ==
- Politics of Côte d'Ivoire
- Ivorian Civil War
