= United Nations Security Council Resolution 1572 =

UN Security Council Resolution 1572
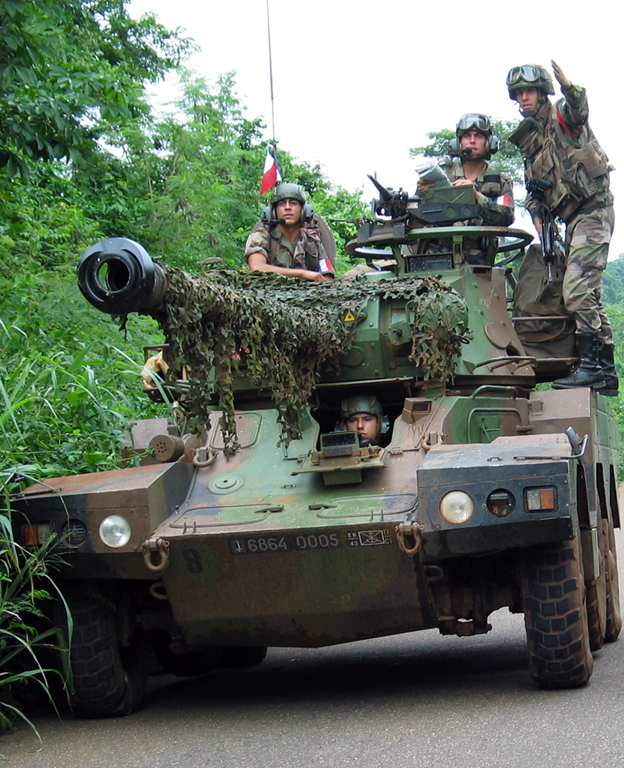
- French forces in Côte d'Ivoire
- Date: 15 November 2004
- Meeting no.: 5,078
- Code: S/RES/1572 (Document)
- Subject: The situation in Côte d'Ivoire
- Voting summary: 15 voted for; None voted against; None abstained
- Result: Adopted

Security Council composition
- Permanent members: China; France; Russia; United Kingdom; United States
- Non-permanent members: Algeria; Angola; Benin; Brazil; Chile; Germany; Pakistan; Philippines; Romania; Spain

United Nations Security Council resolution 1572, adopted unanimously on 15 November 2004, after recalling Resolution 1528 (2004) on the situation in Côte d'Ivoire (Ivory Coast), the council imposed an arms embargo on the country following recent violence and threatened further sanctions if Ivorian parties did not comply with their political commitments.

== Resolution ==
=== Observations ===
The security council noted that, despite various political agreements, hostilities had resumed in Côte d'Ivoire in violation of the ceasefire agreement of May 2003. There was concern at the humanitarian situation and the use of media to incite hatred against foreigners in the country. At the same time, ongoing efforts by the African Union and Economic Community of West African States (ECOWAS) to establish peace and stability were praised.

=== Acts ===
The security council condemned air raids by the National Armed Forces of Côte d'Ivoire as a violation of the ceasefire and demanded that all parties comply with the ceasefire agreement, further emphasising there was no military solution to the conflict. It reaffirmed support to the United Nations Operation in Côte d'Ivoire (UNOCI) and French forces. Meanwhile, it also demanded that all radio and television broadcasts inciting hatred and violence immediately cease.

The resolution imposed an arms embargo on Côte d'Ivoire for an initial period of 13 months, which would not apply for United Nations or humanitarian uses. Additionally, a 12-month travel ban and asset freeze was imposed on those who were attempting to prevent the peace process, violate human rights or incite hatred in the country. The restrictions would not apply in the case of humanitarian need. The Council decided that the measures would be reviewed in 13 months, and a Committee was established to monitor the implementation of the sanctions.

== See also ==
- 2004 French–Ivorian clashes
- First Ivorian Civil War
- List of United Nations Security Council Resolutions 1501 to 1600 (2003–2005)
- Opération Licorne
