= 2010–2011 Ivorian crisis =

Dispute over the presidency of Ivory Coast

Date	28 November 2010 – 11 April 2011 (4 months and 2 weeks)
Location	Ivory Coast
Result	Anti-Gbagbo victory: Capture of President Gbagbo by opposition forces.; Opposition leader Alassane Ouattara is sworn-in as the duly elected President.; Gbagbo is extradited to the International Criminal Court on 30 November 2011, becoming the first head of state to be taken into the court's custody.

Belligerents
Gbagbo forces: (Ivory Coast) Ivorian Army; (Ivory Coast) Ivorian Police; Ivorian Popular Front; supported by: Belarus; Romania	Ouattara forces: Rally of the Republicans; Forces Nouvelles de Côte d'Ivoire; Invisible Commandos; supported by: United States; Burkina Faso	International forces: United Nations; France; Ukraine

Commanders and leaders
Laurent Gbagbo	Alassane Ouattara; Guillaume Soro	Choi Young-jin (United Nations)

Strength
Unknown	Unknown (New Forces)	10,000 (United Nations)

Casualties and losses
44–61 security forces killed	50+ killed (RDR); 2 killed (FN); 2 killed, 16 wounded (UNOCI)	1,000-1,500+ civilians killed and 100 missing overall, one million civilians fled since disputed election

The 2010–11 Ivorian crisis was a political crisis in Ivory Coast which began after Laurent Gbagbo, the President of Ivory Coast since 2000, was proclaimed the winner of the Ivorian election of 2010, the first election in the country in 10 years. The opposition candidate, Alassane Ouattara, and a number of countries, organisations and leaders worldwide claimed Ouattara had won the election. After months of attempted negotiation and sporadic violence, the crisis entered a decisive stage as Ouattara's forces began a military offensive in which they quickly gained control of most of the country and besieged key targets in Abidjan, the country's largest city. At the time, international organizations reported numerous human rights violations, and the UN undertook its own military action with the stated objective to protect itself and civilians.

A significant step in bringing an end to the crisis occurred on 11 April 2011 upon the capture and arrest of Gbagbo in Abidjan by pro-Ouattara forces backed by French forces.

== Announcement of results and post-election conflict ==
On 2 December 2010, Youssouf Bakayoko, head of the Ivorian Commission Electorale Indépendante (CEI), announced provisional results showing that Alassane Ouattara had won the Ivorian election of 2010 in the second round with 54.1% of the vote, against 45.9% for Laurent Gbagbo; he reported that turnout was 81.09%. Results had been expected and then postponed for days, beyond the deadline, and Bakayoko's appearance to announce the results—at an Abidjan hotel heavily guarded by the UN—took the press by surprise. Bakayoko reportedly chose to announce the results at the hotel, which Ouattara had been using as "his base", because he wanted to have the security of UN protection when doing so. According to the 2003 Peace Accords signed in the suburbs of Paris, the majority of the CEI must consist of politicians of the opposition (Democratic Party of Côte d'Ivoire – African Democratic Rally and Rally of the Republicans).

Paul Yao N'Dre, the President of the Constitutional Council (a body that was viewed by the opposition as favoring Gbagbo, because N'Dre was considered an ally of the President), then took to the airwaves to say that the CEI had no authority left to announce any results, because it had already missed its deadline to announce them, and consequently the results were invalid. According to N'Dre, the passing of the deadline meant that only the Constitutional Council was "authorised to announce decisions on the contested results." It was widely presumed that the Court would issue a ruling favoring Gbagbo, although the CEI's results indicated that Gbagbo could only be credited with victory if hundreds of thousands of votes were invalidated.

At the heart of the dispute lies article 94 of the Constitution of Côte d'Ivoire, which reads:

The Constitutional Council shall control the regularity of the operations of the referendum and proclaims the results.

The Council shall decide on:

– the eligibility of the candidates to the presidential and legislative elections;
– the disputes concerning the election of the President of the Republic and of the Deputies.

The Constitutional Council shall proclaim the final results of the presidential elections.

Shortly after the announcements, the military sealed the country's borders.

=== Double victory claims ===
On 3 December, the Constitutional Council declared Gbagbo winner. N'Dre announced that the results in seven northern regions were cancelled, and on that basis declaring the outcome narrowly in favor of Gbagbo, who was credited with 51.45% of the vote while Ouattara had 48.55%.

On the basis of the CEI's results, Ouattara maintained that he was "the elected President" and said that the Constitutional Council had "abused its authority, the whole world knows it, and I am sorry for my country's image". He had the clear backing of the international and regional community for his claim to victory, but top officers in the military appeared to stand firmly behind Gbagbo.

The New Forces and Prime Minister Guillaume Soro both supported Ouattara's claim to victory; Soro said that he considered Ouattara the rightful President and offered his resignation to Gbagbo on 4 December. Gbagbo was sworn in for another five-year term on 4 December, defiantly declaring: "I will continue to work with all the countries of the world, but I will never give up our sovereignty." Sporadic violence and gunfire were reported in various parts of the country, including Abidjan. Gbagbo appointed a new Prime Minister, Gilbert Aké, on 5 December; Aké, an economist and university president, was already regarded as close to Gbagbo.

Ouattara himself was sworn in separately shortly after, saying that "Ivory Coast is now in good hands". Ouattara then re-appointed Soro as his prime minister.

=== Reactions ===
==== Domestic ====
There had been rallies from pro-Gbagbo and pro-Ouattara sides. Simone Gbagbo, wife of Laurent Gbagbo, gave a speech in the pro-Gbagbo rally on 15 January 2011. Ivorian forces have fired live bullets to disperse protesters. In Abobo, an Abidjan suburb and a stronghold of Ouattara's supporters, there were many violent clashes between security forces and civilians.

Aya Virginie Toure organized over 40,000 women in peaceful protests that were violently repressed. In an impassioned interview on BBC News, Toure compared the ongoing Second Ivorian Civil War to the 2011 Libyan civil war and asked for support from the international community. She called for military intervention to remove Laurent Gbagbo from power the same way Charles Taylor was removed in the Second Liberian Civil War.

==== United Nations ====
On 18 December, a United Nations spokesperson said in response to a Gbagbo demand that foreign armed troops leave the country that the UN did not consider Gbagbo to be the president, and that peacekeepers would continue to support and protect both Alassane Ouattara and Ivorian citizens.

On 23 December 2010, the United Nations Human Rights Council passed a resolution that "strongly condemned human rights violations that had taken place in Côte d'Ivoire...that occurred in different parts of Côte d'Ivoire in relation to the conclusion of the 2010 presidential election." The resolution was criticized by Amnesty International as having insufficiently addressed the situation.

==== International ====
Angola and Lebanon were the only countries to send their ambassadors to Gbagbo's swearing-in. The African Union—which, like the United Nations, formally recognised Ouattara as the duly elected President—warned that the conflicting results and subsequent political crisis could result in "incalculable consequences", and sent former President of South Africa Thabo Mbeki to mediate the issue. The US, UN, EU, the Economic Community of West African States (ECOWAS) and former colonial power France affirmed their support to Ouattara.

On 5 December, former South African President Thabo Mbeki held separate talks with Gbagbo and Ouattara, acting as a mediator. The African Union had appointed Mbeki to lead an emergency mission to Côte d'Ivoire "to facilitate the rapid and peaceful conclusion of the electoral process and the efforts to find a way out of the crisis." However, he left the next day without a deal.

Gabonese opposition leader André Mba Obame cited the events in Ivory Coast and the international recognition of Ouattara as Ivorian President as inspiration for declaring himself winner of the controversial 2009 Gabonese presidential election, sparking an ongoing political crisis in Gabon.

On 28 December, presidents Yayi Boni of Benin, Ernest Bai Koroma of Sierra Leone and Pedro Pires of Cape Verde arrived in the country on behalf of ECOWAS, to convince Gbagbo to resign and go into exile for the sake of his country, while declaring it was Gbagbo's last chance before the deployment of military force against him.

On 20 December, White House Press Secretary Robert Gibbs told a news briefing that it was "time for [Gbagbo] to go" and that "We stand ready to impose targeted sanctions, individually and in concert with our partners around the world, on President Gbagbo, on his immediate family, on those who are associated with him and those who continue to cling to power illegitimately." On 21 December, the United States Department of State announced that it had imposed travel sanctions against Gbagbo and 30 allies. William Fitzgerald, the deputy assistant secretary for African affairs, said that trade sanctions may be imposed against individuals. On 22 December, State Department spokesman Philip J. Crowley said that Ouattara's victory was irrefutable and reiterated U.S. demands that Gbagbo step down.

== Threats, violence and human rights violations ==
Between December 2010 and March 2011, there was a series of sporadic outbreaks of violence between Gbagbo's militias and security forces on the one hand and Ouattara's supporters on the other, primarily in the city of Abidjan, where both sides had large numbers of supporters. On 16 December 2010, clashes between opposition supporters and security forces in Abidjan and Yamoussoukro left 44 people dead. It was alleged that a mass grave of opposition supporters had been dug in a pro-Gbagbo neighborhood in Abidjan, but security forces prevented UN investigators from going to the site to check the allegations. Another mass grave was reported to exist in the village of N'Dotre, guarded by government militias.

Clashes between rival ethnic groups seen as being pro-Gbagbo and pro-Ouattara killed 33 people in the central Ivorian city of Duékoué between 3 and 6 January 2011. 11 more people were killed on 11–12 January when fighting broke out in Abidjan between security forces and Ouattara supporters, some of whom were using automatic weapons and rocket-propelled grenades, after the police attempted to conduct a raid in a pro-Ouattara district of Abidjan. The same area was the scene of further clashes on 21–22 February when police again attempted to raid it. 12 opposition supporters were killed when security forces fired machine guns and launched rocket-propelled grenades in the neighbourhood; the next day, opposition fighters ambushed government gendarmes (paramilitary police) and killed 10–15 of them.

Gbagbo's supporters carried out a number of attacks in March, attacking foreign businesses and UN offices in Abidjan on 1 March and killing at least six people attending a pro-Ouattara rally in the city. The northern suburb of Abobo was attacked by Gbagbo's forces on 13 March in a bid to drive out pro-Ouattara supporters, and mobs were also reported to be roaming the city looking for their opponents and attacking or killing them. The violence resulted in 10 confirmed deaths and scores more wounded. Abobo came under heavy attack on 17 March, killing 30 people, when shells were fired into a crowded market from a nearby military barracks. It was unclear whether Gbagbo or Ouattara supporters were responsible, though Abobo is generally pro-Ouattara. On 18 March, the UN issued a statement saying that the shelling was "an act, perpetrated against civilians, [that] could constitute a crime against humanity." Another 52 people were killed in continuing violence in Abidjan between 21 and 26 March.

Opposition figure Guillaume Soro charged that Gbagbo's security forces and Liberian mercenaries had waged a campaign of terror, and that death squads had been responsible for 200 deaths, 1,000 people wounded from gunfire, 40 disappearances and 732 arrests. He told The Guardian that "women have been beaten, stripped, assaulted and raped. When will the international community realise that a murderous insanity has begun in Ivory Coast?" Amnesty International said it had received increasing reports of atrocities in the country. By March 2011, an estimated 450,000+ Ivorians had left the country, of which 370,000 were from the capital city of Abidjan.

On 10 March 2011, it was announced that Gbagbo had banned all French and UN aircraft from Ivorian airspace, with exceptions only if the transport ministry approved. The ban was not challenged by the UN, which continued to fly helicopters despite the order; allies of Ouattara said Gbagbo had no legal authority with which to enforce the ban.

Approximately 1,800 people, including children and civil servants, had taken refuge in Abidjan's Saint Paul's Cathedral since the beginning of the crisis.

Both pro-Ouattara and pro-Gbagbo forces were accused of having participated in the 28–29 March Duékoué massacre, where hundreds of civilians were killed. When asked by U.N. secretary general Ban Ki-moon, Ouattara denied the accusation against his forces, but agreed to conduct an investigation.

== Peaceful protests ==
Numerous peaceful protests of nonviolent resistance have been organized in Ivory Coast and internationally in support of a peaceful resolution to the ongoing crisis.

In December 2010, several street protests were held in Abidjan. Hundreds of women joined the protests and banged pots as a warning about the arrival of the militias. The protesters were met with heavily armed security forces firing into the crowd and killing civilians.

In February 2011, hundreds of youth protested in Abobo, a neighborhood of Abidjan. One man and one woman were killed by security forces who opened fire and used tear gas to disperse the crowd.

On 3 March 2011, 15,000 women held a peaceful protest in Abidjan. Some were dressed in black, some were wearing leaves, and some were naked, all signs of an African curse directed toward Laurent Gbagbo. In the neighborhood of Abobo, they were met by security forces with tanks that allegedly opened fire on the women. Seven women were killed and approximately 100 were wounded. Gbagbo's police officers always denied any involvement of their forces, and Gbagbo's supporters argue that this incident is an elaborate hoax, claiming that the available video footage can hardly match the story.

Despite this violent suppression, Touré organized another demonstration on March 8, International Women's Day, where around 45,000 women participated in peaceful protests across the country. These events highlighted the significant role of women in the nonviolent resistance against Gbagbo's regime during the crisis.

On 8 March, International Women's Day, 45,000 women held peaceful protests across the country. The women were met with youth armed with machetes and automatic weapons firing into the air at Koumassi. One woman and three men were killed in Abidjan by the army.

== Outbreak of violent conflict ==
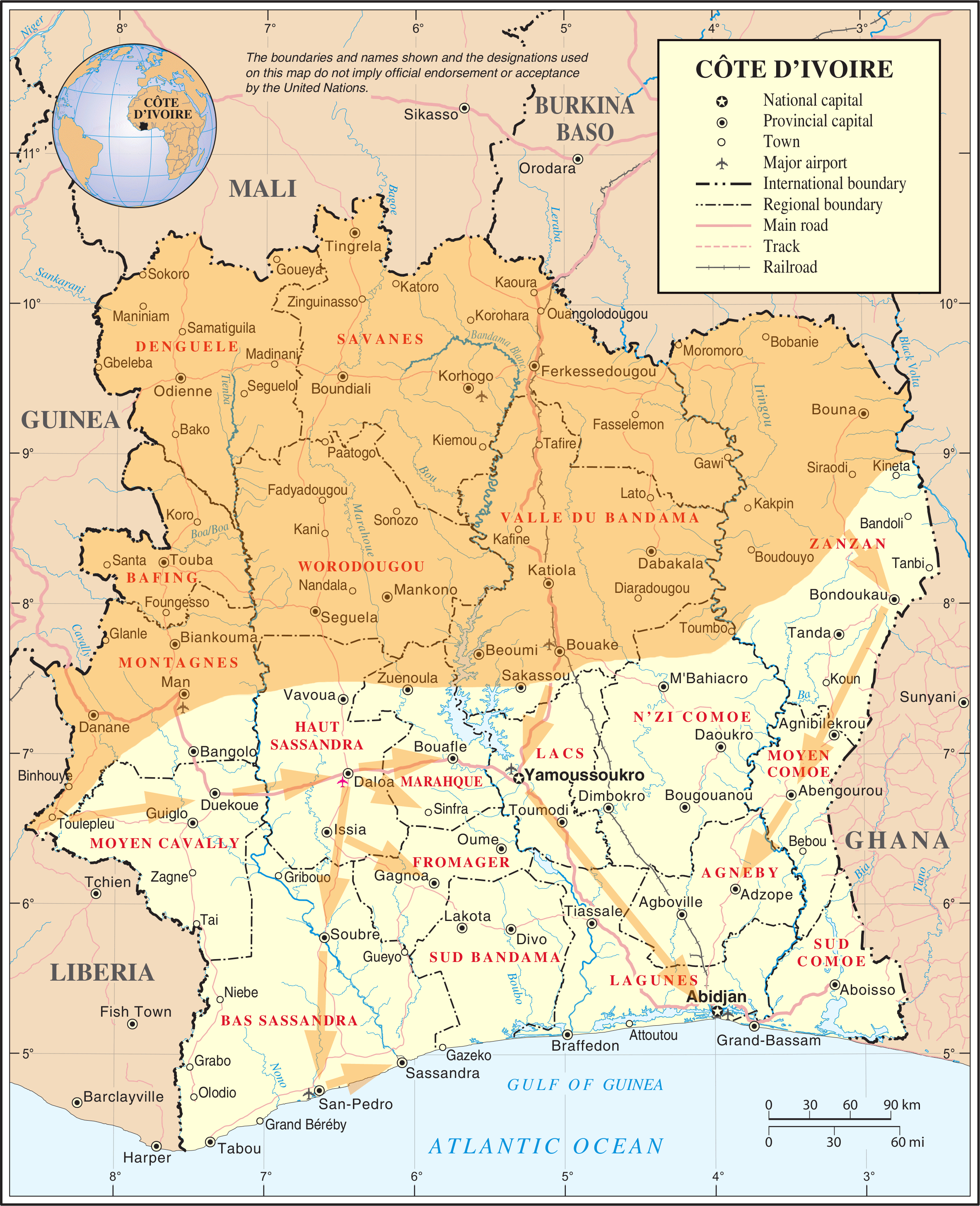
Map of the March 2011 Republican Forces offensive

As the violence continued in Abidjan, heavy fighting broke out in western Côte d'Ivoire at the end of February 2011 as the newly renamed Republican Forces of Côte d'Ivoire (RFCI) sought to close the border with Liberia, from where Gbagbo was reported to have recruited numerous fighters. A series of western towns fell to the RFCI between 25 February and 21 March as it advanced beyond the ceasefire line from the previous civil war. On 28 March the RFCI launched a country-wide military offensive as Ouattara declared that all peaceful solutions had been "exhausted". After heavy fighting in some central Ivorian towns, the RFCI advanced rapidly across the country to seize towns along the eastern border with Ghana, the political capital Yamoussoukro and the key port of San Pédro. By 31 March the RFCI had reached Abidjan as fighting broke out in the city, with Gbagbo loyalists falling back to the area around the presidential palace. United Nations and French forces joined the fighting on 4 April with helicopter attacks on heavy weapons being used by Gbagbo's forces.

Electricity and water to the northern half of the country were also cut 2 March, with no immediate explanation for either event.

=== Status of Gbagbo and Ouattara ===
On 18 December 2010, Gbagbo ordered peacekeeping forces from the United Nations and France to leave the country; the government issued a statement saying that it " demands the departure of the United Nations Operation in Côte d'Ivoire and Opération Licorne forces in Ivory Coast and is opposed to any renewal of their mandate." In January 2011, Gbagbo requested a recount of the votes, along with the creation of a committee composed of international members that would oversee the recount. He also engaged in a diplomatic campaign to gain support from countries like Zimbabwe, while at the same time expelling ambassadors from the United Kingdom and Canada, countries that did not recognize his leadership. After the election, Gbagbo initially retained control of the country's armed forces and the state media, but in part due to the international sanctions which limited Gbagbo's financing abilities, this control gradually crumbled and the offensive by Ouattara forces caused much of Gbagbo's armed forces to defect.

Ouattara was at the first floor of the Golf Hotel in Abidjan while Gbagbo remained at the presidential palace. The hotel was guarded by about 800 UN peacekeepers, who had encircled the site with coiled razor wire and guarded the premises with white UN armored personnel carriers and security checks for visitors.

According to local UN mission chief Choi Young-jin, troops loyal to Gbagbo (about 3,000 militiamen according to an Ouattara spokesman) occupied the neighborhood surrounding the Golf Hotel and set up a blockade that prevented UN trucks from bringing food, water and medicine to the hotel; UN trucks were sent each day but had been turned back every time. Ouattara had a pirate radio station inside the hotel that broadcast campaign songs, speeches from Ouattara, and statements by his spokesman. However, technicians working for Gbagbo had jammed the signal and so as to change frequencies several times a day.

During early March 2011, Ouattara traveled to Ethiopia to meet with an African Union (AU) council tasked with finding a solution to the conflict. Gbagbo refused to attend the meeting, which resulted in the AU confirming Ouattara as the victor in the elections. It was the first time he had left the Golf Hotel since the election was held.

== Reactions ==
=== Media ===
Reporters Without Borders observed that public media had been neutral in its coverage of the candidates, but it also noted that Gbagbo's campaign had received a substantially larger amount of coverage. Reporters have been threatened by armed forces sympathetic to Gbagbo. International radio stations, including France 24, BBC and RFI, were stopped from broadcasting on 2 March.

=== Economy and financial markets ===
The West African Economic and Monetary Union (UEMOA) recognises Ouattara as the winner of the 2010 election. The bank of issue of UEMOA is the Central Bank of West African States (BCEAO)). The governor of BCEAO, Philippe-Henry Dacoury-Tabley, seen as an ally of Gbagbo, was forced to resign by West African leaders on 21 January 2011.

Ouattara said that the continuing crisis hurts the economy. As a declining economy threatens the status of Côte d'Ivoire, as the largest producer of cocoa in the world, a revival hinged on the outcome of the election.

The internationally traded price for cocoa and white sugar fell in the week prior to the election on speculation that the election would spur production.

On 24 January 2011, the cocoa price soared following Ouattara's announcement that coffee and cocoa exports would be banned for a month in hope to cut off the funding for Gbagbo.

Ivory Coast was also forced to default on a $2.3 billion bond as a result of the crisis.

On 9 February 2011 onwards, the Abidjan stock exchange remained closed after Gbagbo's loyalist forces invaded its offices. The following day it reopened. The regional stock exchange Bourse Regionale des Valeurs Mobilieres moved "temporarily" to Bamako, Mali after Gbagbo's troops attacked its office in Abidjan.

During the week from 14 to 18 February, four banks had suspended their operations, and Gbagbo in response nationalized them on 17 February. Most of the cash machines in Abidjan had been empty or out of service and people rushed to the banks to withdraw their cash.

Reports suggested a cash crisis in the country due to a lack of capital inflows and runs on banks forcing national financial institutions to also deplete their reserves. Several banks ceased operations in the country. The move led to Gbagbo loyalist forces to have "nationalised" those banks and "requisitioned" cash from the Central Bank's Abidjan bureau. The opposition said these actions amounted to robbery.

=== International ===
On 23 March, at the Economic Community of West African States (ECOWAS) Summit in Nigeria, a "One Thousand Women March" was organised by peace activists in West Africa in support of the women in the Ivory Coast. They wore white T-shirts and represented countries across West Africa including Côte d'Ivoire, Ghana, Liberia, Nigeria, Sierra Leone and Togo.

On 6 April, in Canada outside the French consulate in Montreal, demonstrators protested against France's military intervention in Ivory Coast and asked for humanitarian corridors to be opened in Abidjan.

On 8 April, in Ireland outside the French embassy in Dublin, demonstrators protested against the international community's "military invasion" of Ivory Coast.

== Gbagbo's capture ==
Gbagbo was arrested on 11 April. From April to August, he and his wife, Simone, were under house arrest in separate locations in northern parts of the country. Gbagbo was sent to Korhogo and Simone to Odienné. Gbagbo and his wife were charged with economic crimes in August. The charges included looting, armed robbery and embezzlement. The government, citing its incompetence, has requested the involvement of the International Criminal Court (ICC) in the investigation of violence related crimes.

On 3 October, the judges of ICC authorized its prosecutor Luis Moreno-Ocampo to probe post-election war crimes and crimes against humanity committed by forces loyal to both Gbagbo and Ouattara. With an arrest warrant issued on 23 November and made known to the public on 29 November, Gbagbo was sent from Côte d'Ivoire on 29 November and arrived in a prison in Scheveningen, a suburb of the Hague, on 30 November.

== After the fall of Gbagbo ==
=== Human rights ===
Human rights remained as an issue. In May 2011, Amnesty International reported that both pro-Gbagbo and pro-Ouattara sides had committed war crimes and crimes against humanity in the conflict. On 20 July 2011, Ouattara inaugurated a commission to investigate the violation of human rights during the conflict.

Reporters Without Borders asked for the release of a detained pro-Gbagbo journalist. The personnel director of the company that published Le Temps, a newspaper close to FPI, was briefly arrested on 24 May 2011 and then released in the same day. The Republican Forces of Côte d'Ivoire occupied the seat of Notre Voie, a newspaper close to FPI, from April to the beginning of September.

=== Continuance of violence ===
According to Human Rights Watch, the violence persisted after the fall of Gbagbo. Militias supporting him had killed at least 220 people during the days immediately before or after the arrest of Gbagbo. In June 2011, it was reported that at least 149 actual or suspected pro-Gbagbo partisans had been killed by the forces of Ouattara since April. In August, similar events committed by the forces of Ouattara were reported again by the media. A summary of a press conference by UNOCI in August reported several confrontations between FRCI and youths in Ores-Krobou, Abadjin-Kouté, Abadjin-Doumé, Akoupé-Zeudji, and Biéby.

On the night of 24–25 April 2012, the village of Sakré, in the Southwest near Liberia, was attacked by an armed group equipped with heavy weapons including rockets, leaving 8 dead.

=== Politics ===
On 1 June 2011, Guillaume Soro formed a new government. No one in the cabinet came from the pro-Gbagbo camp. Guillaume Soro is the prime minister and minister of defence. The mandate of Choi Young-ji ended on 31 August, and Albert Gerard Koenders became the new UN Special Representative for Côte d'Ivoire on 1 September.

On 28 September, Commission dialogue, vérité et réconciliation (CDVR) (English: Dialogue, Truth, and Reconciliation Commission) was inaugurated in Yamoussoukro. It is an 11-member commission headed by former Prime Minister Charles Konan Banny. The commission includes religious leaders, regional representatives, and Chelsea footballer Didier Drogba to speak for Ivorians living abroad. It is modelled after the Truth and Reconciliation Commission of South Africa. However, Konan Banny expressed that the commission would not have amnesty powers nor powers to absolve anyone.

A legislative election was announced in September and held on 11 December. It was the first legislative election since 2000, due to the crisis in 2002. Ouattara hoped that new legislators could be elected before the major development projects announced in the presidential campaign start. The election was boycotted by FPI, Gbagbo's party, and was won by the parties of Ouattara and his allies. The atmosphere of the election was calm, but the turnout was low.

=== Economy ===
On 27 June 2011, UN lifted the last sanctions against Ivorian enterprises, including Radiodiffusion télévision ivoirienne (RTI), Association des producteurs de caoutchouc naturel de Côte d'Ivoire (APROCANCI), and Société de gestion du patrimoine de l'électricité (SOGEPE). On 8 July 2011, IMF resumed the aid to Côte d'Ivoire. On 25 October, the United States announced that Côte d'Ivoire, excluded since 2005, was again eligible for the African Growth and Opportunity Act (AGOA), which gives trade preferences to eligible countries.

On 3 August 2012, the first commercial court of Côte d'Ivoire was set up in Abidjan, with the aim of encouraging the investment and the economical development.

=== Military ===
On 3 August 2011, Ouattara promoted several important and controversial ex-chiefs in the New Forces who were said to have brought Ouattara to his position. Among those promoted was Martin Fofié Kouakou, appointed as the new commandant of Korhogo, who had been accused of being involved in extrajudicial executions by UN. In 2012, Ouattara claimed to have crushed a coup plot by military officers loyal to Gbagbo.

== See also ==
- Impact of 2010–2011 Middle East and North Africa protests
- United Nations Security Council Resolution 1980
