= Émile Constant Bombet =

Ivorian politician (1941–2026)

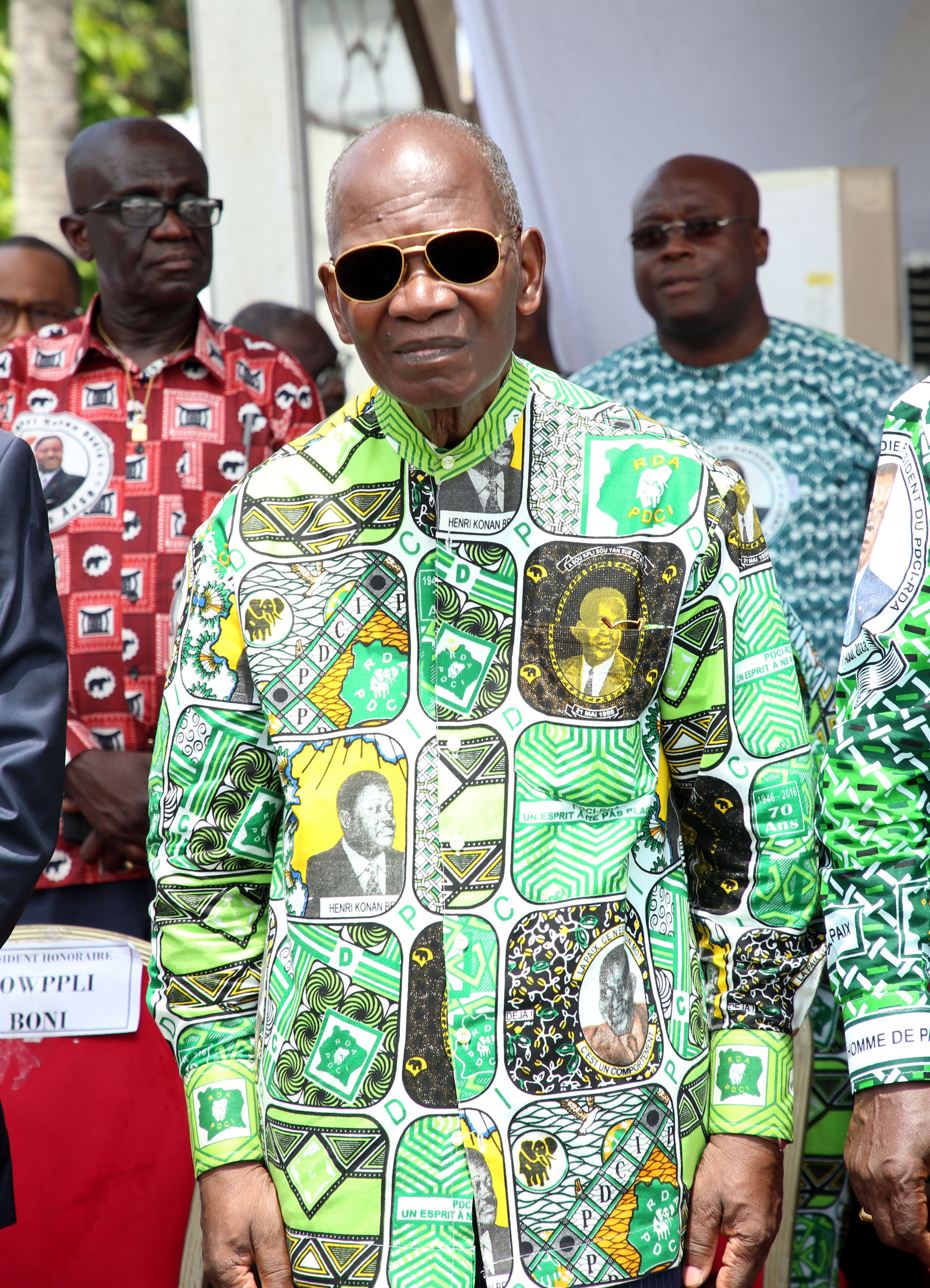
- Bombet in 2024

Minister of the Interior
- In office 7 November 1990 – 24 December 1999
- President: Félix Houphouët-Boigny; Henri Konan Bédié
- Prime Minister: Alassane Ouattara; Daniel Kablan Duncan
- Preceded by: Léon Konan Koffi
- Succeeded by: Issa Diakité

Personal details
- Born: 16 March 1941 Rubino, French Ivory Coast, French West Africa
- Died: 22 July 2026 (aged 85) Abidjan, Ivory Coast
- Party: PDCI-RDA
- Occupation: Military officer

Émile Constant Bombet (16 March 1941 – 22 July 2026) was an Ivorian politician of the Democratic Party of Ivory Coast – African Democratic Rally (PDCI-RDA).

Bombet notably served as Minister of the Interior under the governments of Alassane Ouattara and Daniel Kablan Duncan from 1990 to 1999, a time during which he pursued greater austerity measures and directed PDCI-RDA presidential campaigns. He was imprisoned in 2000, a result of the 1999 Ivorian coup d'état, which saw President Henri Konan Bédié removed from office. After his popularity surged as a result of the arrest, he unsuccessfully ran for president in 2000.

Bombet died in Abidjan on 22 July 2026, at the age of 85.
