= Paul Yao N'Dré =

Ivorian politician and magistrate

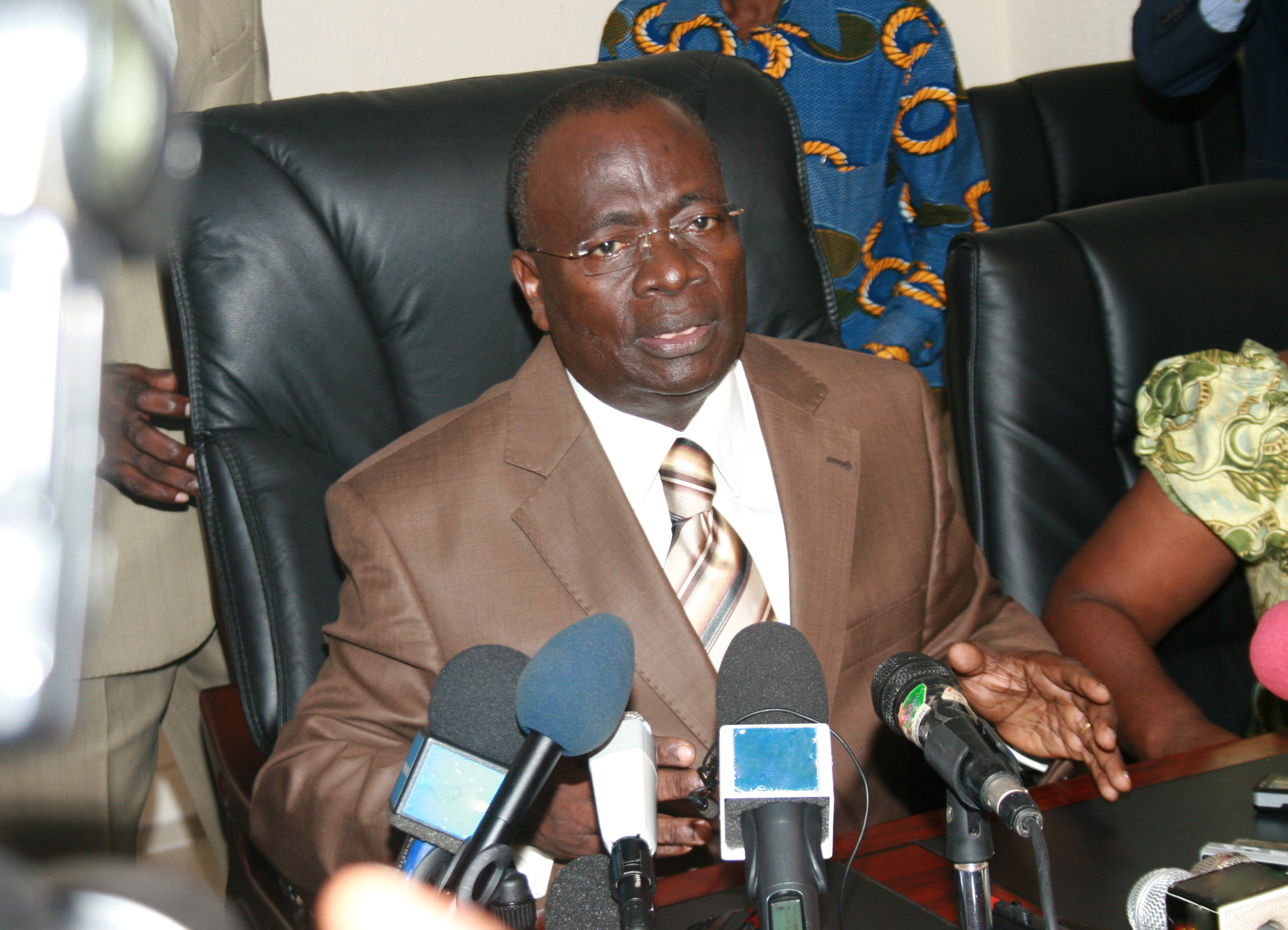
Paul Yao N'Dré in 2010

Paul Yao N'Dré (born 29 December 1956) is an Ivorian politician and magistrate who was president of the Constitutional Council of Côte d'Ivoire from 2009 to 2011. A long-time loyalist of president Laurent Gbagbo, he had served in the government for a time as Minister of the Interior.

== Political and legal career ==
Born at Gogobro in Divo Department, Yao N'Dré is a member of the Dida ethnic group. He worked as a law professor and was active in Gbagbo's political party, the Ivorian Popular Front (FPI), for years. During Gbagbo's presidency, he was elected to the National Assembly as an FPI candidate in the December 2000–January 2001 parliamentary election and served in the government as Minister of the Interior. In the immediate aftermath of the September 2002–January 2003 civil war, he was no longer a minister in the government, but he remained influential and was considered part of Gbagbo's personal circle of advisers. He eventually became the FPI's National Secretary for Justice and Human Rights.

On 8 August 2009, upon the expiry of Yanon Yapo's six-year term as president of the Constitutional Council, president Gbagbo appointed Yao N'Dré to succeed Yapo. His appointment concerned the opposition, who worried that the Council might not be an impartial body if headed by Yao N'Dré. Denouncing the appointment, the opposition paper Le Nouveau Réveil said that it was impossible to imagine that Yao N'Dré would ever approve election results showing that Gbagbo had lost the election. Jeune Afrique noted that Gbagbo lacked control over the Independent Electoral Commission (CEI) and the electoral preparations, and that his power to appoint a staunch political loyalist to head the Constitutional Council offered him another way to influence the outcome of the forthcoming presidential election.

=== 2010 election controversy ===
The presidential election was finally held, after many delays, in October 2010. No candidate received a majority of the vote, necessitating a run-off between opposition leader Alassane Ouattara, who placed second, and President Gbagbo, who placed first. The second round was held on 28 November 2010, and a tense wait for results followed. Results were expected and then postponed for days, beyond the deadline for the announcement of results.

On 2 December 2010, Youssouf Bakayoko, the president of the Independent Electoral Commission (CEI), went to the United Nations-guarded hotel where Ouattara was staying and announced provisional election results showing that Ouattara had won the election in the second round with 54.1% of the vote, against 45.9% for Laurent Gbagbo. Yao N'Dre, the president of the Constitutional Council, promptly took to the airwaves to say that the CEI had no authority left to announce any results, because it had already missed its deadline to announce them, and consequently the results given by Bakayoko were invalid. According to Yao N'Dre, the passing of the deadline meant that only the Constitutional Council was "authorised to announce decisions on the contested results." It was widely presumed that the council would issue a ruling favoring Gbagbo, although the CEI's results indicated that Gbagbo could only be credited with victory if hundreds of thousands of votes were invalidated.

Yao N'Dre announced the final election results from the Constitutional Council on 3 December 2010; as expected, the council's results were sufficiently different from the CEI's results to alter the outcome and hand victory to Gbagbo. The results from seven northern regions were cancelled by the Council due to irregularities, thereby swinging the outcome narrowly in favor of Gbagbo, who was credited with 51.45% of the vote while Ouattara had 48.55%. The council's decision produced a political crisis, as both Gbagbo and Ouattara claimed to have been rightfully elected president. Gbagbo was sworn in for a second term on 4 December.

The political dispute between Gbagbo and Ouattara eventually turned into an armed conflict, and there was heavy fighting in Abidjan in March–April 2011. Ouattara's forces captured Gbagbo and effectively took control of the city on 11 April 2011. Having fled to Ghana, Yao N'Dré returned and met with Ouattara on 21 April 2011; after the meeting, he said that Ivorians were collectively responsible for the turmoil, rejecting the notion of individual responsibility, and he spoke of the need to rebuild and cooperate. Although he was said to be "visibly tense", it was clear that he had accepted that Ouattara was the president, and he referred to Gbagbo as a former president. Because it was a legal necessity for the Constitutional Council to legitimize Ouattara's rule, it was expected that Yao N'Dre would have to play his part in the process of formally installing Ouattara as president.

Accordingly, Yao N'Dré announced on 5 May 2011 that the Constitutional Council proclaimed Ouattara to be president of Côte d'Ivoire. Explaining what appeared to be a reversal of its decision a few months prior, he said that the council had accepted the decision of the African Union, which had endorsed Ouattara's claim to have won the election. Yao N'Dré also said that Ouattara would be sworn in as president on 6 May, with an inauguration ceremony to be held separately due to the circumstances on 21 May 2011.

Yao N'Dré swore Ouattara in as president on 6 May 2011. Speaking on the occasion, Yao N'Dré discussed reconciliation but was subjected to some heckling. Ouattara was at least superficially respectful towards Yao N'Dré, although one observer noted that Ouattara's body language suggested "contempt" for the magistrate. Ouattara subsequently appointed another politician, Francis Wodié—who had supported Ouattara in the 2010 election—to replace Yao N'Dré on 25 July 2011.
