= Francis Wodié =

Ivorian politician (1936–2023)

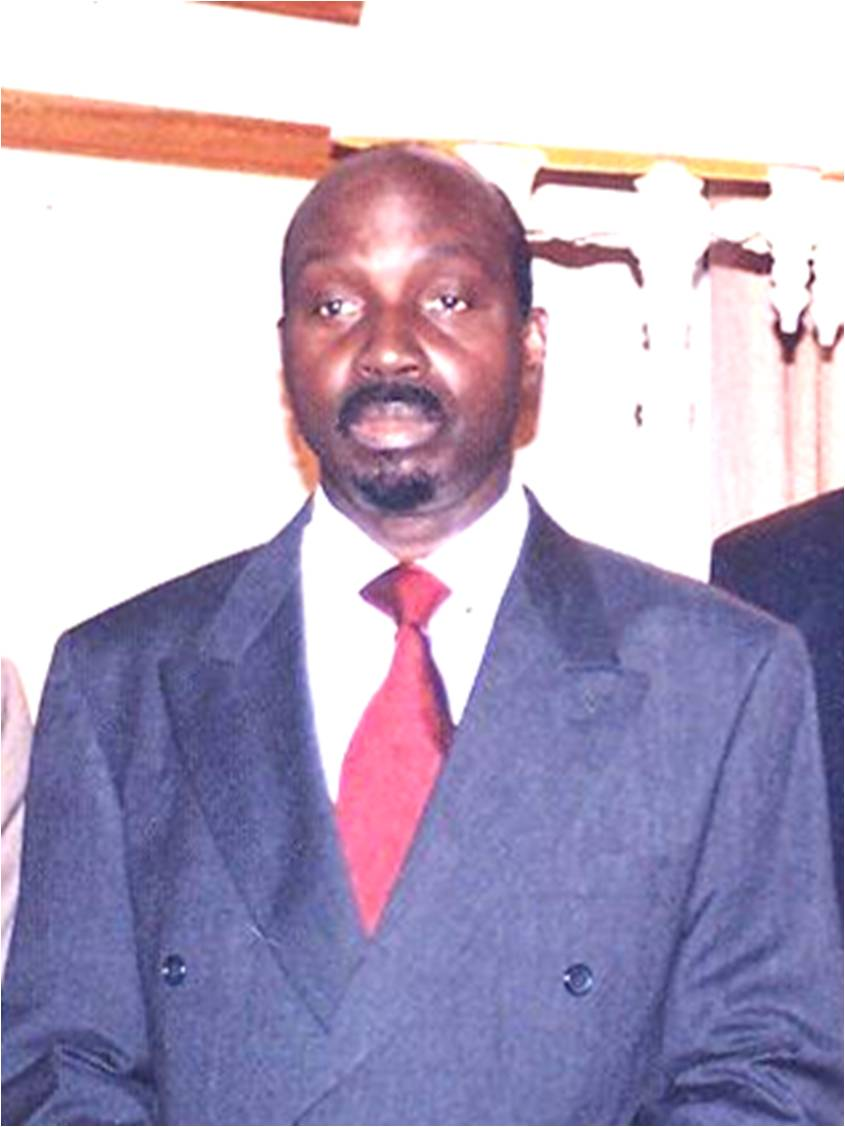

President of the Constitutional Council of Ivory Coast
- In office 25 July 2011 – 28 January 2015
- President: Alassane Ouattara
- Preceded by: Paul Yao N'Dré
- Succeeded by: Mamadou Koné

Minister of Higher Education and Scientific Research of Ivory Coast
- In office 11 August 1998 – 24 December 1999
- President: Henri Konan Bédié

Deputy of the National Assembly of Ivory Coast for the Cocody district
- In office 25 November 1990 – 26 November 1995

Personal details
- Born: 25 February 1936 Abidjan, French West Africa
- Died: 3 July 2023 (aged 87)

Francis Vangah Romain Wodié (25 February 1936 – 3 July 2023) was an Ivorian politician, jurist, and human rights activist. He led the Ivorian Workers' Party (PIT) from 1990 to 2011. During that time, Wodié served as a Deputy in the National Assembly of Côte d'Ivoire from 1990 to 1995 and as Minister of Higher Education from 1998 to 1999. He was President of the Constitutional Council of Côte d'Ivoire from 2011 to 2015.

== Biography ==
=== 1936–1990 ===
Wodié was born in Abidjan on 25 February 1936. He attended primary school in M'Bahiakro and secondary school in Abidjan. Afterwards he studied law in Dakar, Senegal, and in France at Poitiers and Caen. While in France, he was a member of the Executive Bureau of the Association of Ivorian Students in France. In July 1961, he was arrested "for endangering the safety of the State of Côte d'Ivoire in France", expelled from France, and placed under house arrest in Abidjan. Following his release in January 1962, he continued his studies in France. After completing his studies, he returned to Côte d'Ivoire, where he began teaching at the University of Abidjan. He was a founding member of the National Union for Research and Higher Education (SYNARES) and was its Secretary-General. In March 1971, he was accused of "subversive activities", and as a result, he lived in exile in Algiers until August 1973.

Wodié was the dean of the faculty of law at the University of Abidjan from 1980 to 1986. He was also a founding member of the Ivorian League of Human Rights, and from 1985 to 1989, he was President of the Ivorian section of Amnesty International. He was a founding member of the Ivorian Workers' Party (PIT) in April 1990 and led the party from the time of its formation as its First National Secretary. In May 1990, referring to the spread of multiparty politics in Africa, which was previously dominated by single-party regimes, Wodié said that "establishing a multiparty system is only a step on the way to democracy, not an end in itself".

=== 1990–2023 ===
Wodié was the only PIT candidate to win a seat in the November 1990 parliamentary election. He won the seat for the Cocody district in Abidjan, prevailing over two candidates from the ruling Democratic Party of Côte d'Ivoire (PDCI) and a candidate from the opposition Ivorian Popular Front (FPI). After the election results were announced, showing that the PDCI had won an overwhelming parliamentary majority, Wodié said that he found the results "difficult to believe", because they suggested that the opposition was less popular than he thought; to explain the outcome, he pointed to low turnout among voters, arguing that many people failed to vote in the belief that the PDCI would win through fraud.

Wodié served in the National Assembly until losing his seat in the 1995 parliamentary election. As the only candidate standing against President Henri Konan Bédié in the October 1995 presidential election, which was boycotted by other opposition parties, Wodié won 3.52% of the votes.

In the government named on 11 August 1998, Wodié was appointed Minister of Higher Education and Scientific Research. Explaining his decision to join the government, Wodié said that, although the PIT was an opposition party, it also favored consultations enabling the party to contribute to national development. He remained in his ministerial post until Bédié was ousted in the military coup of 24 December 1999. Along with other ministers, Wodié was detained following the coup, but he was released on 28 December. In February 2000, Wodié announced his candidacy for the October 2000 presidential election. In this election, Wodié placed third with 5.7% of the votes. At the time of the 2000 election, the Associated Press characterized him as "an intellectual without a strong national following".

Having served as the First National Secretary of the PIT since the time of its Constitutive Congress, Wodié was instead elected as President of the PIT at the party's 3rd Ordinary Congress in August 2004.

Wodié stood again as the PIT candidate in the October 2010 presidential election, but he attracted minimal support. He and his party backed Alassane Ouattara in the second round of the presidential election. The election produced an extended and violent dispute over the results; Ouattara eventually prevailed when forces loyal to him captured Abidjan in April 2011. Wodié stepped down as head of the PIT in 2011, but Ouattara then appointed him as President of the Constitutional Council on 25 July 2011; Wodié was appointed to replace Paul Yao N'Dre, a loyalist of Ouattara's ousted opponent Laurent Gbagbo.

Wodié resigned as President of the Constitutional Council on 28 January 2015. He was succeeded by Mamadou Koné on 20 February.

Francis Wodié died on 3 July 2023, at the age of 87.

== See also ==
- National Assembly
- Constitutional Council of Côte d'Ivoire
- Henri Konan Bédié
- Ivorian Workers' Party
