= Alliance des jeunes patriotes pour le sursaut national =

The Alliance des jeunes patriotes pour le sursaut national (English: Alliance of Young Patriots for National Survival), commonly known as Jeunes patriots (Young Patriots), is a political youth organization in Côte d'Ivoire. It supports President of Côte d'Ivoire Laurent Gbagbo and his ruling Ivorian Popular Front (FPI) party. Its founder, and current leader, is Charles Blé Goudé.

== Organisation ==
The group formed in 2002, as a wider, and more militant coalition of nationalist groups, led by Blé Goudé's Congrès Panafricain des Jeunes et des Patriotes (COJEP), which still is the dominant organization.

This new organisation incorporated the following groups:

- COJEP, Blé Goudé's original organisation;
- la Fédération des étudiants et scolaires de Côte d'Ivoire (FESCI), another student organization loyal to Gbagbo;
- The campaign to repatriate Alassane Ouattara, an Ivorian Muslim politician and opponent of Gbagbo who originally came from Burkina Faso; and
- Thierry Legré's "Movement for the Republican Conscience".

At a rally in December 2010, Blé Goudé encouraged the Jeunes patriots to "liberate" the country of opposition groups and foreign peacekeepers. The organization is alleged to have engaged in violent attacks on unarmed United Nations personnel, as well as committing arson at the offices of opposition newspapers. According to anthropologist Till Förster, "The most brutal episodes in the Young Patriots’ short history were probably the extremely violent aggression against French citizens, other foreigners and international institutions in Abidjan in November 2004 and later, in 2006, their attacks on ONUCI offices in Abidjan and Guiglo in the west."

== Directors ==
The principal directors are:

- Charles Blé Goudé, Secretary-general;
- Jean-Yves Dibopieu, former Secretary-general of FESCI;
- Richard Dacoury, président de la Sorbonne;
- Idriss Ouattara, président des agoras et parlements de Côte d'Ivoire;
- Ahoua Stallone, porte-parole;
- Koné Seydou;
- Thierry Légré

== See also ==
- Congrès Panafricain des Jeunes et des Patriotes
- Charles Blé Goudé
- Fédération des étudiants et scolaires de Côte d'Ivoire (FESCI)
- Ivorian Civil War
