= People's Socialist Union =

Political party in Ivory Coast

People's Socialist Union Union Socialiste du Peuple
- Secretary: Henri Tohou
- Founded: 4 May 1996
- Registered: 27 March 2000
- Headquarters: London (Exile)
- Ideology: Social democracy Democratic socialism
- Political position: Centre-left

Website
- usp-ci.com

The People's Socialist Union (French: Union Socialiste du Peuple) is an Ivorian political party based in London.

== History ==
The People's Socialist Union (USP) was founded in 1996. The general secretary of USP was Henri Tohou, who on 19 February 1990, initiated and led a small group of students from Yopougon University (Abidjan). It was the first significant Ivorian students' uprising against President Félix Houphouët-Boigny's regime. Houphouët-Boigny headed one of the most brutal French-sponsored dictatorships in Africa. Along with other students, they targeted the MEECI, the former national students' movement from which the ruling party drew its young supporters. The MEECI was later replaced by FESCI (Federation of students and school pupils), founded in April 1990 under the leadership of Henri Tohou, Martial Ahipeaud, Azowa Beugre Amos, and Ahononga Gregoire. Following continuous unrest initiated by students of the Yopougon Campus where Tohou was living and brutal repressions from the military (especially the elite military force) the rapid intervention force of para-commandos led by the then-Commander Faizan attacked the students.

Bi Sehi, Tohou, and hundreds of students fled the university campus and sought sanctuary in the cathedral Saint Paul of Plateaux-administrative center of Abidjan. They were surrounded by troops and after hours of negotiations, the force was used by the military, and students were taken to various military barracks where they were subjected to torture and other inhuman and degrading treatments. However, Tohou and two others escaped from the cathedral and went back to their University Campus from where, with the support of dozens of students, they went from secondary to primary schools to seek pupils' support in an attempt to transform their action into a national uprising. By midday, the city of Abidjan was full of smoke. Tohou moved to other cities of the country and the armed forces lost control of the situation.

For the first time, the leader, Houphouët-Boigny, of the 30-year-old dictatorship declared that the country could accept any kind of change provided that it was done in peace and order. Underground opposition parties used that opportunity to submit their application to the ministry of interior to have their parties recognized. The country returned to multipartyism after 30 years of a single party with a single radio station, TV station, and state newspaper.

Henri Tohou became the national organization secretary of FESCI (Students movement) and became later Deputy Secretary of Finance as he also had other national responsibilities as National President of Youth of the Ivorian Socialist Party (PSI) which later became the PPS (Party for Progress and Socialism) and also a freelance journalist for the Côte d'Ivoire Nouvelle.

In 2014, Tohou was arrested and held in custody for 19 days.

== Present state ==
Since May 1996, Tohou and others have created a new political party (USP) which they also call "The People's Socialist Party". The party has been campaigning about the risk of a civil war in Côte d'Ivoire, but few Western countries paid attention to their warning. When the civil war started in Côte d'Ivoire, the USP campaigned against the policy of a full-scale war supported by the government and instead proposed a peaceful settlement. Henri Tohou has been in exile in London since 1994. The USP believes that the old politicians who brought war to their country must be replaced by a new generation of politicians not involved in the atrocities suffered by the Ivorian people.

The party has increased and strengthened its branches throughout Côte d'Ivoire, including the north and west areas currently under rebels' control. The party held its convention in London from the 23 to 25 July 2009 during which Henri Tohou, previously Secretary-General of the party, has been elected president and given the power to stand for the presidential elections. A new Secretary-General has been appointed and he has now traveled to Abidjan to plan the campaign with local USP leaders.

On 16 October 2009, the last day for submission of applications to the national electoral commission for candidates who want to run for the presidency, Henri Tohou's application was submitted to the electoral commission by his legal team and his spouse who traveled from Britain. An electoral deposit of approximately £30,000 was paid to the Ivorian national treasury.
