= Michel Gueu =

Ivorian politician and army general

Michel Gondi Gueu (born 10 August 1951 in Bingerville) is an Ivorian politician and army general (2S).

== Biography ==
=== Family ===
Michel Gueu comes from the extreme West of the Ivory Coast and is from the Dan Yacouba people. He is married and the father of 7 children.

=== Beginning of career ===
Michel Gueu has completed his training as an active cadet officer at the École des Forces Armées de Bouaké in 1977 (promotion Perseverance) and then has completed a platoon leader course at the École d'application de l'arme blindée et de cavalerie of Saumur.

In 1995, Lieutenant-Colonel Gueu was commander of the 1st Infantry Battalion in Akouédo, after serving for four years as second in command from 1991 to 1995. He was appointed Commander of the Republican Guard (GR) from December 1999 to October 2000.

=== During the politico-military crisis of 2002-2007 ===
On 19 September 2002, when the armed insurrection of the MPCI (Patriotic Movement of Côte d'Ivoire) broke out, Lieutenant Colonel Gueu was the second in command of the 3rd military region of Bouaké. At the head of few men, Lieutenant-Colonel Gueu organised a resistance from the ENSOA (Ecole Nationale des Sous-Officiers d'Active) in Bouaké during four days, from Friday 20 to Wednesday 25 September.

Following an extraordinary council of ministers held at the presidential palace in Abidjan between 22 and 23 September 2002, the Bouaké region was declared a "war zone"; Lieutenant-Colonel Gueu was appointed "Commander of operations".

Under pressure of the heavily armed assailants, Lieutenant Colonel Gueu and his men, equipped only with small arms, were forced to abandon their position. Lieutenant-Colonel Gueu was arrested on Wednesday 25 September and made prisoner by the MPCI.

On 27 October 2002, Colonel Gueu was forced to accompany the MPCI actors to Lomé (Togo) for peace negotiations with the government. That day marks his first contact with Guillaume Soro.

As a negotiator, he was one of the signatories of the Linas-Marcoussis agreements of 26 January 2003 putting an end to hostilities. Following these agreements, Michel Gueu was appointed, in March 2003, Minister of Sports and Leisure of the newly formed Government of National Reconciliation.

Following the attempted assassination of Guillaume Soro, then Minister of Communication, by some "Jeunes Patriotes" (Young Patriots) on 27 June 2003, Minister Michel Gueu sought to appease the situation by declaring that "there is no question of taking up arms again".

When the war resumed in 2004, Michel Gueu regained his position as Commander of Guillaume Soro's operations. After the Ouagadougou Agreement of 4 March 2007, which put an end to the conflict and consecrated his rank of Brigadier General, Michel Gueu followed Guillaume Soro as head of the military cabinet and became Prime Minister of the transitional government. This position made him one of the architects of the unified army provided by the agreements.

=== Post-electoral crisis of 2010-2011 and the start of Alassane Ouattara's presidency ===
When a new armed conflict erupted following the controversial 2010 presidential election, General Gueu, Commander of military forces loyal to President Alassane Ouattara, has been one of the architects of the FRCI lightning offensive launched against Laurent Gbagbo in March 2011.

In April 2011, he participated in the completion of the security of the Abidjan metropolis.

From May 2011, his profile was strongly felt and in July 2011, General Gueu was appointed Special Chief of Staff of the President of the Ivory Coast.

He was appointed Major General on 7 July 2011.

=== After his departure from the army ===
In 2013, as he was exercising his retirement rights after 39 years in the army, General Gueu was asked by President Ouattara to take over as head of the historical telecommunications operator, Côte d'Ivoire Telecom. He was elected chairman of the board of directors of this company on 7 November 2013 and remained in office until December 2016.

Committed to raising awareness of peace in the Ivory Coast, Michel Gueu said in March 2019 on the sidelines of an assumption of command in Bouaké: "To politicians, I ask them to talk to each other, to get along, Ivory Coast is our only mother to all of us".

General Gueu joins the PDCI and is appointed Vice-President on 29 November 2019 by President Henri Konan Bédié.

In an interview given to Nouveau Réveil on 7 January 2020, Michel Gueu urges President Ouattara to appease the situation in order to avoid a new crisis in the Ivory Coast.

In the context of the presidential elections of October 2020, General Gueu says he is confident that the PDCI will win.

=== Commitment to peace ===
Michel Gueu is committed to the promotion of peace and reconciliation in the Ivory Coast. He has received the ICS Pan-African Prize (2010-2011) of the Restorers of Democracy, the N'Zassa Prize 2011 in recognition of his strong actions to restore peace and solidarity in the Ivory Coast and the title of Dignitary of Peace through Sport by the Ivorian Football Federation.
