= Ahipeaud =

Ahipeaud is a surname. Notable people with the surname include:

- Martial Joseph Ahipeaud (born 1966), Ivorian politician
- Noel Ahipeaud Guebo, Ivorian diplomat
