= Constitutional Council (Ivory Coast) =

National constitutional court

The Constitutional Council (French: Conseil constitutionnel) is a judicial body in the government of Ivory Coast that is patterned after the Constitutional Council of France. The Council was created by law in 1994 and began its operations in 1995. The seat of the Council is in Abidjan.

== Jurisdiction and powers ==
The Constitutional Council exercises the following powers:

1. determining the eligibility of candidates to run in presidential or legislative elections;
2. certification and announcement of final election results;
3. conducting referendums;
4. determining the constitutionality of legislation and treaties.

Proposed legislation and treaties may be submitted by the government to the Council for a determination of constitutionality prior to the enactment of the law. They may also be submitted for scrutiny after they have been enacted.

If the constitutionality of a law is challenged in a judicial proceeding, the court may make a ruling on the issue and appeals on constitutionality issues are heard by the Constitutional Council. If a legal provision is declared to be unconstitutional, it cannot be enforced or applied.

No decision of the Constitutional Council may be appealed to any body. The Council is therefore the supreme court for matters within its jurisdiction.

== Composition ==
The Constitutional Council may be composed of a President, two Vice-Presidents, former Presidents of Ivory Coast, and six councillors, or advisers. Decisions are made by majority vote. The President and Vice-Presidents serve six-year non-renewable terms and are appointed by the President of Ivory Coast. The six advisors are also appointed by the President of Ivory Coast to six-year non-renewable terms; three of the advisors are nominated by the President of Ivory Coast, and three are nominated by the President of the National Assembly.

Former Presidents of Ivory Coast are entitled to lifetime membership on the Council. However, no former president has yet become a member of the Council.

Members of the Constitutional Council hold the rank of minister of the government. The President of the Constitutional Council administers the oath of office to the newly elected President of Ivory Coast.

=== Current members ===
Name	Position	Term	Appointed by
Mamadou Koné	President	2015–21	Alassane Ouattara
François Guéi	Advisor	2011–17	Alassane Ouattara
Hyacinthe Sarassoro	Advisor	2011–17	Alassane Ouattara
Emmanuel Kouadio Tano	Advisor	2011–17	Alassane Ouattara
Loma Cissé	Advisor	2014–20	Alassane Ouattara
Geneviève Koffi	Advisor	2014–20	Alassane Ouattara
Emmanuel Assi	Advisor	2014–20	Alassane Ouattara

=== List of presidents ===
- Noël Nemin (1995–99)
- None (1999–2003)
- Yanon Yapo (2003–09)
- Paul Yao N'Dré (2009–11)
- Francis Wodié (2011–15)
- Mamadou Koné (2015–2023)
- Chantal Camara (Since 2023)

== Role in 2010–11 crisis ==
A decision of the Constitutional Council played a role in the 2010–11 Ivorian crisis. In the Ivorian presidential election of 2010, incumbent Laurent Gbagbo faced opposition leader Alassane Ouattara. On 2 December 2010, the Independent Electoral Commission released provisional results showing that Ouattara had won the election in the second round with 54 percent of the vote. However, the Constitutional Council refused to certify these results, and on 3 December, it declared that Gbangbo was the winner after taking just over 51 percent of the vote. The Council's decision was based on its refusal to certify the results from seven regions in the north of the country, where it identified irregularities. Supporters of Ouattara argued that this was a pretext created by Paul Yao N'Dré, the President of the Council and a Gbangbo loyalist.

As a result, both Gbagbo and Ouattara claimed victory and took the presidential oath of office. The ensuing events led Second Ivorian Civil War, which resulted in the overthrow and arrest of Gbangbo and the installation of Ouattara as President in 2011. Ouattara's right to become president was affirmed by the Council after Ouattara and N'Dré met for negotiations.

After Ouattara became president, Francis Wodié was appointed to replace N'Dré as president of the Council.
