= Congrès Panafricain des Jeunes et des Patriotes =

Ivory Coast youth political movement

The Congrès Panafricain des Jeunes et des Patriotes (COJEP), commonly known as Young Patriots of Ivory Coast, is the name given to a youth movement supportive of then President of Ivory Coast, Laurent Gbagbo and his ruling Ivorian Popular Front (FPI) party. Its founder is Charles Blé Goudé.

Set up in June 2001, the group attracted controversy and international condemnation due to its alleged involvement in extra-judicial killings and for organising demonstrations which often turned violent. The organisation is nationalist and opposed to the Islamification of the country, with Gbagbo's supporters tend to be Christians from the south, as opposed to the rebel forces from the largely Muslim north, which fought the First Ivorian Civil War against the Gbagbo government from 2002 to 2006. The organisation itself claims that it rejects violence, and that it has been misrepresented in the Western media, especially that of France.

== History ==
Blé Goudé founded COJEP in June 2001, at the end of his term as the head of another youth movement in Ivory Coast, after it had suffered an ideological split and become deeply politicised, with one section allying itself to a military junta within the country. The new movement he set up was fiercely supportive of Laurent Gbagbo, who had been elected in 2000.

On September 26, 2002, within a week of the failed coup d'état by the Ivorian army, Blé Goudé, who was in Manchester finishing a degree, flew back to Abidjan to mobilise the COJEP along with several other youth movements, merging them into a more militant version of the group called Alliance des jeunes patriotes pour le sursaut national ("Youth Alliance for National Survival").

This new organisation incorporated:

- COJEP – Blé Goudé's original organisation
- la Fédération des étudiants et scolaires de Côte d'Ivoire (FESCI) – another student organisation loyal to Gbagbo
- The campaign to repatriate Alassane Ouattara, an Ivorian Muslim politician and opponent of Gbagbo who originally came from Burkina Faso
- Thierry Legré's "Movement for the Republican Conscience"

In January 2003, they prevented Dominique de Villepin, France's Minister of Foreign Affairs, from leaving the presidential palace for three-quarters of an hour.

In November 2004, the Young Patriots attacked French homes and businesses, forcing thousands of white people to flee, as they were thought to be French. This was fueled by anger over France's perceived role in the then two-year-old ongoing civil war. In addition, France was said to be interfering in the economy and maintaining the country as a client state. Calls for violence against whites and non-Ivorians were broadcast on national radio and TV after the Young Patriots seized control of its offices. The attacks drew international condemnation, and Kofi Annan described the group as a militia.

In October 2005, presidential elections which were due to be held in Ivory Coast were cancelled, after Gbagbo used a law which allowed him to stay in power. The UN, already accused of having taken a stance sympathetic to the French as well as the northern rebels, criticised this, and this led to a series of protests in January 2006.

== January 2006 events ==
January 16, 2006, the Young Patriots were involved in violent demonstrations against the UN, and in one incident, at least four were killed after an exchange of fire at a UN peacekeeper's camp. UN peacekeepers are allowed to shoot if they come under violent attack. The crisis began after UN mediators called for the National Assembly (Ivory Coast) to be dissolved and for Gbagbo's mandate to end.

During the days that followed, two thousand youths clashed with UN peacekeepers. The Young Patriots seized control of the offices of Ivory Coast's state-owned television channel, RTI, and broadcast repeated messages to attack the UN base in Daloa, as well as French targets. They also reportedly ransacked a community radio station, Radio Tchrato-Daloa which had refused to let them in, as well as besieging a UN base and the French embassy for two days, until on January 20, Blé Goudé called for them to go home and "clean up the streets".

== Ideology ==
The Young Patriots described themselves as fighting against "neo-colonialism and imperialism". They claimed that France, which formerly colonised the country, had a stranglehold on the Ivorian economy, with most ports and major companies being French owned.

Up until the start of the civil war, millions of refugees had entered Ivory Coast from neighbouring countries such as Mali, Burkina Faso, Liberia and Sierra Leone to escape hunger and conflict. This produced resentment in the native population, as immigrants provided cheap labour and were perceived to be taking their jobs, especially in poorer areas of Abidjan, where support for the Young Patriots is strongest. The Young Patriots are hostile to the rebel forces in the north of the country, which is largely dominated by Muslims, often poor migrant workers from neighbouring nations.

Only people between the ages of 20 and 32, of Ivorian descent or whose parents are both Ivorian, are allowed to become members of the organisation. This policy excludes many people from the north of the country, who migrated there more than 40 years earlier, prior to the country's 1960 independence from France. The organisation has been blamed for violent attacks on "foreigners" who do not match this definition.

The organisation is heavily supportive of Gbagbo, and Blé Goudé, its leader, has been described as "the fourth most powerful man in the country". Despite the violent actions by some demonstrators, he compares himself to Mahatma Gandhi and Martin Luther King Jr. and claims to use pacifist resistance.
