= Truth and Reconciliation Commission (Ivory Coast) =

Truth and reconciliation commission of the Ivory Coast

The Commission Dialogue, vérité et reconciliation (CDVR; English: Dialogue, Truth, and Reconciliation Commission) was sworn in by President of Ivory Coast Alassane Ouattara on September 28, 2012 in response to the post-election violence of the 2010-2011 Ivorian Crisis. The 11-member Commission, led by former Prime Minister Charles Konan Banny, consisted of religious leaders, regional representatives and Ivorian Chelsea soccer player Didier Drogba. The Commission was modelled on the South African Truth and Reconciliation Commission and given two years to complete its mandate to investigate past human rights violations and provide recommendations on how to prevent future abuses and provide reparations to victims. In addition to gathering private statements from victims, the CDVR organized public hearings, during which victims confronted perpetrators in front of CDVR commissioners. However, the lack of television broadcasts from the commission and minimal media coverage meant that powerful witness statements had little impact across the country. Since the completion of the report and final recommendations, Ouattara has not published the final report, in spite of several calls to that effect. The CDVR led to the creation of the Commission Nationale pour la Réconciliation et l’Indemnisation des Victims (CONARIV) (English: National Commission for Reconciliation and Compensation of Victims) on March 25, 2015 with a compensation fund of 15 million Euros.

== Creation and mandate ==
Before the CDVR, Ivory Coast was still recovering from a decade of conflict and unrest, rooted in both political discord and ethno-communal tensions, which culminated in the 2010-2011 post-election crisis. The refusal of outgoing president Laurent Gbagbo to accept Ouattara as the winner of the 2010 election led to a violent political crisis during where at least 3,000 civilians were killed, upwards of 150 women were raped, and human rights violations were committed by both parties. On April 27, 2011, Ouattara promised to create a commission following the model of South Africa's Truth and Reconciliation Commission and announced former Prime Minister Charles Konan Banny as the commission's leader. The commission was charged to, “elaborate a typology of human rights violations,” “establish truth and situate responsibility for past and present sociopolitical events,” “listen to victims and obtain the recognition of facts by perpetrators” and “identify and make recommendations toward the fight against injustice, inequalities of all kind, tribalism, nepotism, the exclusion, as well as hatred in all of their forms”. Notably missing was the commission's lack of amnesty powers or powers to absolve anyone. In December 2014, Banny presented the CDVR's final report to then-President Ouattara.

== Context ==
The protection of human rights involves a multi-dimensional web of national and international mechanisms to monitor, judge, denounce, and coerce states, as well as to provide relief to victims. As several West African countries transitioned from political regimes marked by violence, conflict, and human rights abuses, including Ivory Coast, many modeled their path toward transitional justice after South Africa, creating reconciliation commissions in the hope of determining root causes and societal consequences of past human rights violations. However, within the scope of transitional justice, truth commissions tend to lean towards restorative rather than retributive justice models, often aimed at reconciling divided societies in the wake of conflict rather than holding those accused of human rights violations accountable.

== Impact ==
The commission delivered its final report to Ouattara in December 2014, but as of December 2018, the report had not yet been made public. Ouattara has never provided an explanation for not releasing the report. The only concrete action that arose from the CDVR was the creation of the CONARIV with compensation fund of 15 million Euros made available for the indemnification of victims of abuses committed from 1990 to 2012. Another government agency, the Programme National de Cohésion Sociale (PNCS) (English: National Program for Social Cohesion) was created to execute the reparations program.

== Criticisms ==
The CDVR was widely criticized by local civil societies, victims’ groups, and international NGOs. Most international and local human rights observers agreed the commission made little progress in achieving its mandate and widely criticized Ouattara for not publishing the final report. The 80 public testimonies represented only a small fraction of the 72,483 witness statements received by the Commission. Media coverage was also restricted raising questions over whether the commission could meet its goals of healing the national trauma. Many criticized the commission's overly ambitious attribution and lack of ability to translate into concrete policies, promote reconciliation and stronger social cohesion.

The nomination of Banny prompted swift accusations of political bias. Some foreign diplomats as well as members of Ivorian civil society, including pro-Ouattara organizations, voiced concern about the nomination of Banny — a veteran politician in the Parti Démocratique de la Côte d'Ivoire (PDCI). Citing his partisan political background as Ouattara's political advisor during the 2010 election and perceived lack of consultation with civil society in making the nomination they were uncertain as to whether he would inspire groups on both sides to feel comfortable with and confident in the commission.
