= Ivorian Workers' Party =

Political party in Ivory Coast

Ivorian Party of Workers Parti ivoirien des travailleurs
- Leader: Joseph Séka Séka
- Founded: April 8, 1990
- Ideology: Democratic socialism Social democracy
- Political position: Centre-left
- Colours: Purple, pink, white, blue

Website
- www.pitci.org

The Ivorian Party of Workers (French: Parti ivoirien des travailleurs, PIT) is a centre-left, democratic socialist and social democratic political party in Ivory Coast. It was led by Francis Wodié and was founded on April 8, 1990.

The PIT ran Wodié as its candidate in both the 1995 and 2000 presidential elections. He was the only candidate standing against President Henri Konan Bédié in the October 1995 presidential election, which was boycotted by other opposition parties; he won 3.52% of the votes. In the October 2000 presidential election, Wodié placed third with 5.7% of the votes.

In the parliamentary election held on 10 December 2000 and 14 January 2001, the party won 4 out of 225 seats in the National Assembly of Ivory Coast.

Wodié led the party as its First National Secretary from the time of its Constitutive Congress until the party's 3rd Ordinary Congress in August 2004, when he was elected as President of the PIT. Since 2015, its leader has been Joseph Séka Séka.

== Electoral history ==
=== Presidential elections ===
Election	Party candidate	Votes	%	Votes	%	Results
Election	Party candidate	First round		Second round		Results
1995	Francis Wodié	75,699	4.0%	-	-	Lost ✗
2000	Francis Wodié	102,253	5.7%	-	-	Lost ✗
2010	Francis Wodié	13,406	0.29	-	-	Lost ✗

=== National Assembly elections ===
Election	Party leader	Votes	%	Seats	+/–
1990	Francis Wodié	157,264	19.8%	1 / 175	▲1
2000–01	Francis Wodié	Unknown	Unknown	4 / 225	▲4
2011		17,889	0.92%	0 / 255	▼4
