= Arabs in Ivory Coast =

There are over 100,000 Arab cultural residents in Ivory Coast as of 2009. Most are either former expatriates or current shopkeepers' families who are descended from immigrants of Middle Eastern and North African origin.

== History ==
=== Anti-Arab riots ===
In 2004, the Young Patriots of Abidjan, a strongly nationalist organisation, rallied by the State media, plundered possessions of foreign nationals in Abidjan. Calls for violence against whites and non-Ivorians were broadcast on national radio and TV after the Young Patriots seized control of its offices. Rapes, beatings, and murders of white expatriates and local Lebanese followed. Thousands of expatriates and ethnic Lebanese fled. The attacks drew international condemnation.

== See also ==
- Arab diaspora
- Ethnic groups in Ivory Coast
