= Charles Blé Goudé =

Ivorian politician

Charles Blé Goudé (seated, center) with supporters of the COJEP after their storming of RTI studios in Abidjan, 2006.

Charles Blé Goudé (born 1 February 1972) is an Ivorian political leader, born at Guibéroua, in the centre west of the country. He was acquitted by the International Criminal Court on 15 January 2019 of crimes against humanity allegedly committed in Côte d'Ivoire during the presidency of Laurent Gbagbo.

== Creator of the Young Patriots ==
Blé studied English at the University of Cocody (Cocody is a Commune of Abidjan), where he began his political career leading strikes and demonstrations of the Student Federation of Cote d'Ivoire (FESCI), allied with the FPI during the 1990s. He succeeded Guillaume Soro as the Secretary General of FESCI from 1998 to 2000. He later founded the Coordination des Jeunes Patriotes in 2001, and the Congrès Panafricain des Jeunes et des Patriotes (COJEP) in the same year. Blé had completed a university degree in English by this time, and later began a master's degree in Conflict Resolution Studies from Manchester University, which he never completed. Having received news of the rebellion on 19 September 2002, he left England for Côte d'Ivoire, where he founded the Alliance des Jeunes Patriotes pour le Sursaut National, which he directed with Serge Kuyo, an organization which he described as a pressure group. He is widely known and referred to as the "Street General" because of his capacity in igniting crowds.

== Nationalist resistance ==
Blé played a significant role in Ivoirian politics as a supporter of the ideas and policies of Laurent Gbagbo. He has organized protests and demonstrations in support of the former president and in protest against the rebellion in the north of Côte d'Ivoire. He has also lent his support to the police.

=== 2004: Civil war resumes ===
At the beginning of 2004, Blé called for the expulsion of French peacekeeping troops from Côte d'Ivoire, and during June he organized a sit-in outside the headquarters of the French 43e bataillon d'infanterie de marine in Port-Bouët in Abidjan.

Early in November 2004, after the peace agreement had effectively collapsed following the rebels' refusal to disarm, Laurent Gbagbo ordered airstrikes against the rebels. During one of these airstrikes in Bouaké, a French base (in a school) was targeted and French soldiers were hit and nine of them were killed, along with an American NGO worker; the Ivorian government claimed it was an error and ordered an investigation to be carried out, but the French claimed it was a deliberate attack. They responded by destroying most Ivoirian military aircraft, and violent retaliatory riots against the French, and those perceived to be French, broke out in Abidjan.

During the week from 31 October to 5 November 2004, Blé and his supporters intensified their recruitment of supporters. On 6 November, amidst an upsurge of anti-Western propaganda from the government controlled Radio Télévision Ivoirienne and newspapers such as Le Courrier d'Abidjan, the Jeunes Patriotes came out into the streets, attacking targets they thought supported European interests, especially the French Military and civilians. Attempts by these nationalist groups to seize the airport and the city centre, which were occupied by the French Army, failed. Blé, claiming the French military was attempting a coup against the Ivorian government, urged his supporters to surround Abidjan airport, and to form a human chain around the residence of President Gbagbo, near the Hôtel Ivoire. In the demonstrations that followed attacks on French and other international expatriates living in Côte d'Ivoire intensified and culminated in a French led evacuation of many expatriates civilians from the country. There were many reports of white nationals (Europeans and Lebanese) being attacked and women raped by the militia.

=== January 2006 events ===
On 16 January 2006, Blé's Young Patriots were involved in demonstrations against the UN, and in one incident, at least four were killed after fire allegedly from the UN peacekeeper's camp. The crisis began after UN mediators called for the National Assembly of Côte d'Ivoire to be dissolved and for Gbagbo's mandate to end.

During the days that followed, two thousand youths clashed with UN peacekeepers. The Young Patriots went to the offices of Côte d'Ivoire's state-owned television company, RTI, and repeatedly broadcast messages to encourage protests against the UN in Daloa, as well as French military. They also reportedly ransacked a community radio station, Radio Tchrato-Daloa which had refused to let them in, as well as besieging a UN base and the French Embassy for two days, until on 20 January, Blé called for them to go home and "clean up the streets". He was famously quoted as saying "Chacun son blanc" ("to each his white man").

== Ivorian Peace Process ==
After 2006, Blé continued to play a leading role in nationalist politics. His public conflicts with other nationalists and members of Laurent Gbagbo's FPI, as well as continued attacks on opposition supporters by the jeunes patriotes, kept him in the public eye.

In May 2007, Blé accepted the government title of "Ivorian Peace Ambassador" and travelled around the country supposedly to preach reconciliation. Blé has said that he models himself on Kwame Nkrumah, Patrice Lumumba and Thomas Sankara.

In the two years of run-up to the often delayed (by the FPI) United Nations supervised Presidential Election, Blé campaigned and organized for Laurent Gbagbo, both as head of the FPI youth wing, and as a close adviser of the First Lady Simone Gbagbo, and as head of COJEP.

=== 2010 and 2011 events ===
In 2010, Blé was nominated as Minister for Sports and Youth by the government of Laurent Gbagbo. He recruited some 5,000 pro-Gbagbo youth into the Ivorian Army and after only four weeks of training, arming them with AK47s, and putting them out on the streets of Côte d'Ivoire.

=== 2013: beginning of the end ===
Blé was arrested on 17 January 2013 in Ghana, under a CPI arrest warrant, by members of the Ghanaian Police accompanied by Interpol agents, and surrendered to the Ghanaian authorities; he was flown to Abidjan the next day. He appeared in the Abidjan High Court on 21 January 2013 and was charged with war crimes, assassinations, endangering state security, and stealing state property. He was remanded in custody.

== 2014 to present: International Criminal Court ==
On 22 March 2014, Côte d'Ivoire extradited Blé to the International Criminal Court in The Hague to face charges of crimes against humanity. His case was combined with that of Laurent Gbagbo; their trial commenced on 28 January 2016. On 15 January 2019 Gbagbo and Goudé were acquitted by the ICC and their release was ordered.

In September 2021, Blé claimed 819,300 euros in damages for the long legal proceedings he sustained.

In August 2024, Blé filed a complaint for defamation and cyber harassment, following a controversy Charles Blé Goudé seeks to get closer to the Ivorian government.

In December 2024, Blé requested an amnesty to be able to run in the presidential election of October 2025. He was not included in the final list of candidates.
