= 2000 Ivorian presidential election =

Election in Ivory Coast

- 22 October 2000
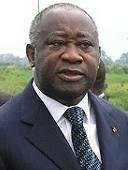

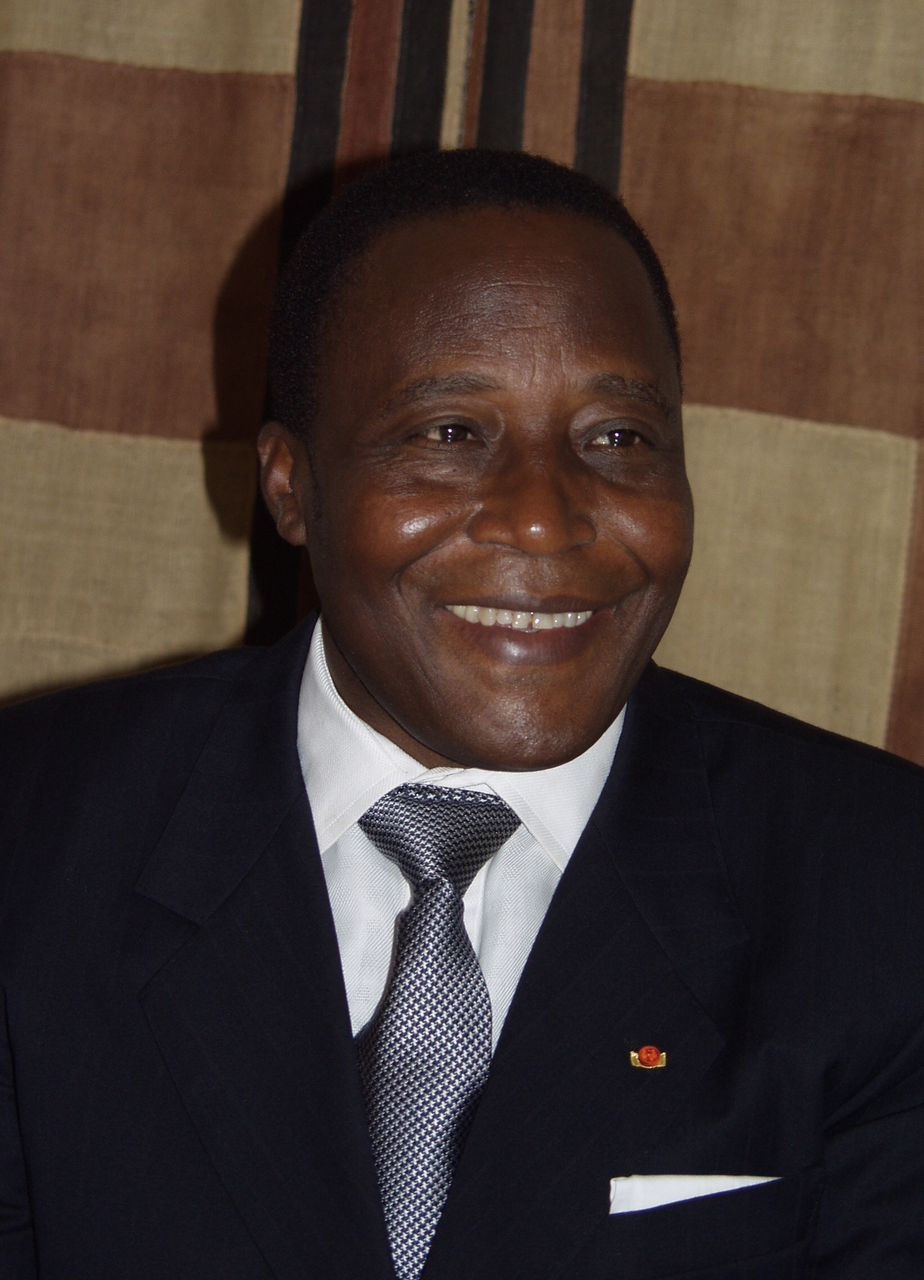

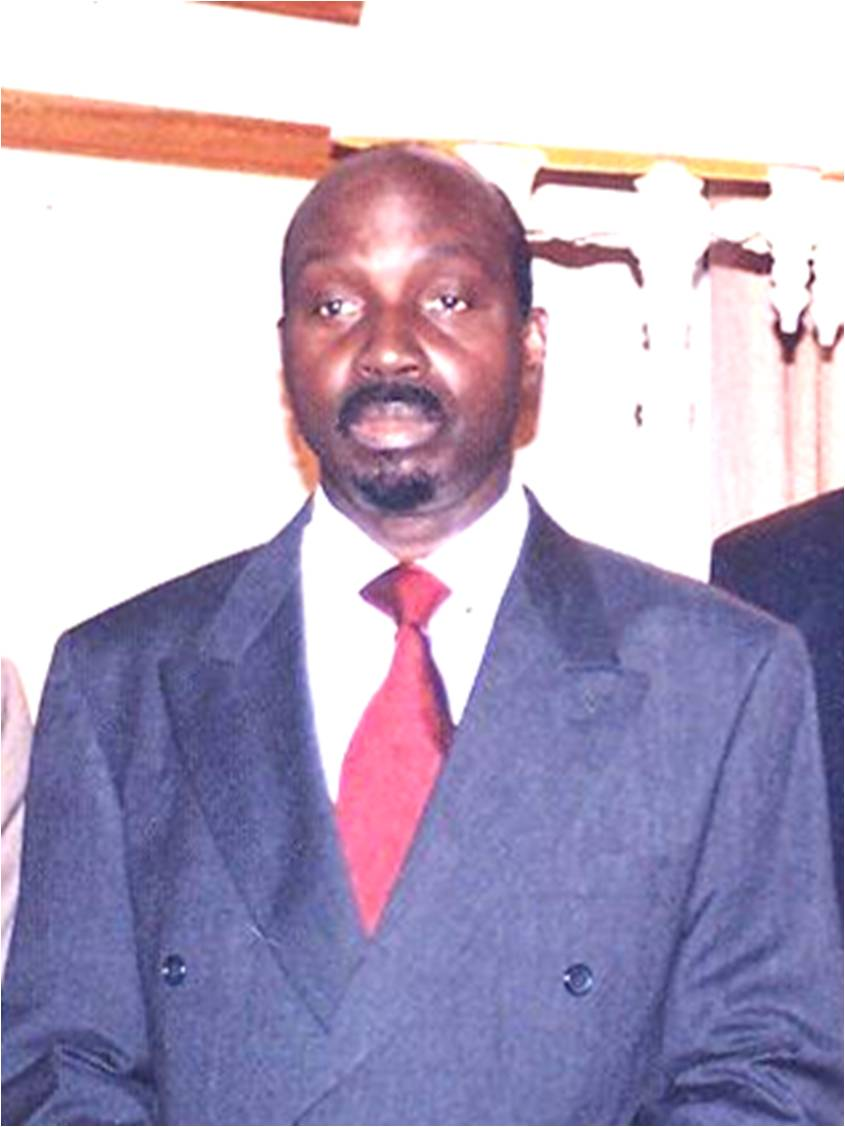
Nominee	Laurent Gbagbo	Robert Guéï	Francis Wodié
Party	FPI	Independent	PIT
Popular vote	1,065,597	587,267	102,253
Percentage	59.36%	32.72%	5.70%
President before election
Robert Guéï
Independent
Elected President
Laurent Gbagbo
FPI

Presidential elections were held in Ivory Coast on 22 October 2000. Robert Guéï, who headed a transitional military regime following the December 1999 coup d'état, stood as a candidate in the election. All of the major opposition candidates except for Laurent Gbagbo of the Ivorian Popular Front (FPI) were barred from standing. The Rally of the Republicans (RDR) and Democratic Party of Côte d'Ivoire – African Democratic Rally (PDCI-RCA) boycotted the election in response to the exclusion of their candidates (Alassane Ouattara and Émile Constant Bombet respectively) by the Supreme Court.

Guéï initially claimed to have won the presidency in a single round. However, it soon emerged that Gbagbo had actually won 59 percent of the vote—enough to win in a single round. When Guéï continued to insist he had won, a wave of protests drove him from power, and Gbagbo was sworn in as President. Two years later the First Ivorian Civil War broke out, and the next presidential elections were not held until 2010.

== Results ==
Candidate	Party	Votes	%
Laurent Gbagbo	Ivorian Popular Front	1,065,597	59.36
Robert Guéï	Independent	587,267	32.72
Francis Wodié	Ivorian Workers' Party	102,253	5.70
Théodore Mel Eg	Union of Democrats of Ivory Coast	26,331	1.47
Nicolas Dioulo	Independent	13,558	0.76
Total		1,795,006	100.00
Valid votes		1,795,006	87.60
Invalid/blank votes		254,012	12.40
Total votes		2,049,018	100.00
Registered voters/turnout		5,475,143	37.42
Source: African Elections Database
