= Gilbert Aké =

Ivorian academic and politician

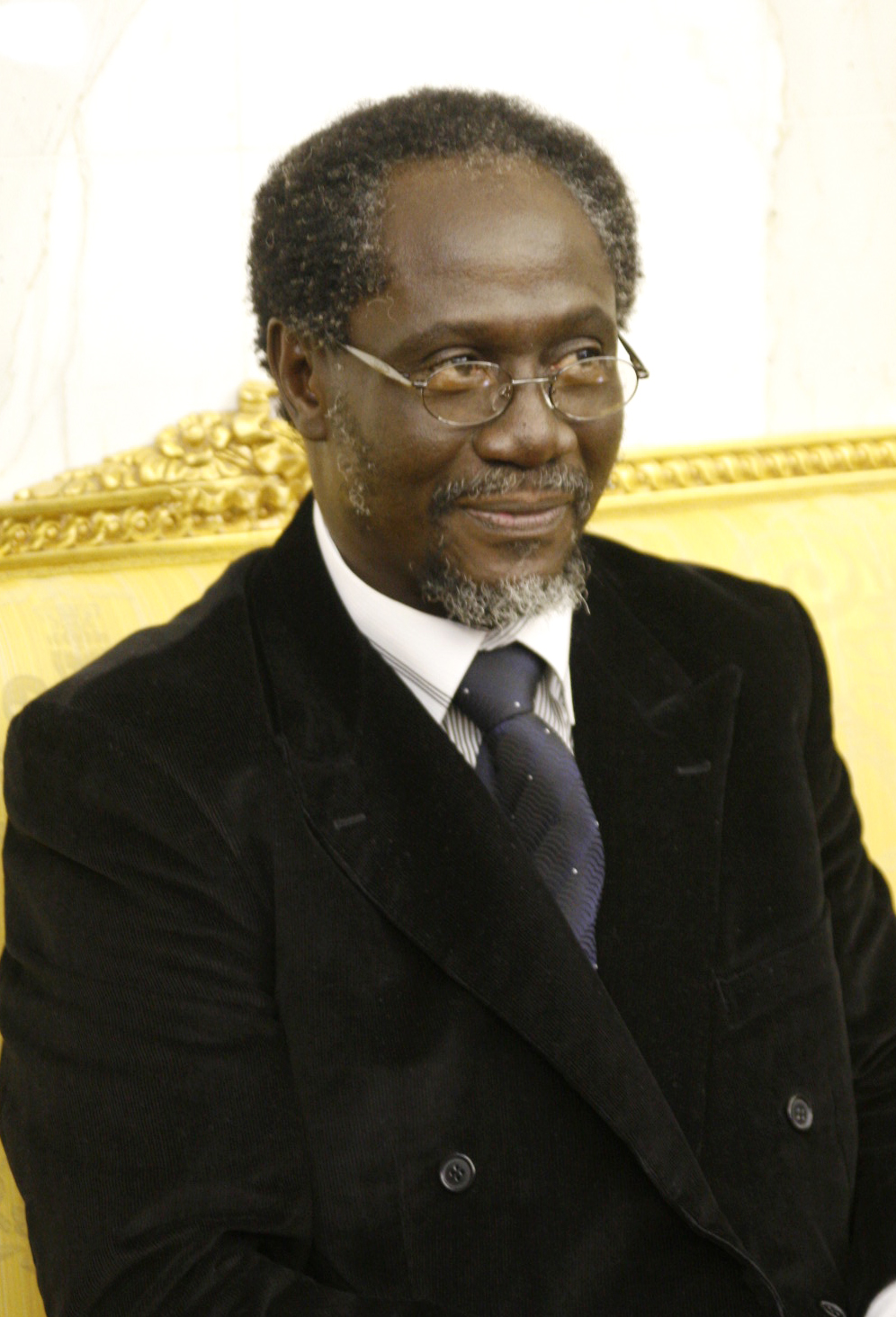

8th Prime Minister of the Ivory Coast
- In office 6 December 2010 – 11 April 2011*
- President: Laurent Gbagbo
- Preceded by: Guillaume Soro
- Succeeded by: Guillaume Soro

Personal details
- Party: Ivorian Popular Front
- The office of Prime Minister was disputed between Aké and Guillaume Soro from 6 December 2010 to 11 April 2011.

Gilbert Marie N'gbo Aké (born 1956) is an Ivorian academic and politician. He was named Prime Minister of Côte d'Ivoire by President Laurent Gbagbo after the latter claimed victory in the disputed 2010 presidential election.

== Life and career ==
Professor Gilbert Marie N'gbo Aké successfully obtained a State PhD in economics in 1991 at the University of Toulouse, specialising in econometrics and regulatory economics. He was Dean of the Faculty of Economics and Management from 2001 to 2007. He was President of the Université de Cocody until 2011, and he was Chairman of the Scientific Committee for the celebration of the 50th anniversary of Côte d'Ivoire's independence. He was appointed as prime minister by Laurent Gbagbo on 7 December 2010, at the beginning of the 2010–11 Ivorian crisis.

Following Gbagbo's ouster, Aké's appointment was nullified by ordinance n°2011-007 of 14 April 2011. In May 2011 he was arrested and charged with threatening national security. In December 2012, he and seven other former ministers of Laurent Gbagbo's last government were released.

== See also ==
- Laurent Gbagbo
- University of Toulouse
- Université de Cocody
