= 1990 Ivorian parliamentary election =

- 25 November 1990
- All 175 seats in the National Assembly; 88 seats needed for a majority
- Turnout: 42.47%
Party	Leader	Seats	+/–
PDCI–RDA	Félix Houphouët-Boigny	163	−12
FPI	Laurent Gbagbo	9	New
PIT	Francis Wodié	1	New
Independents	–	2	New
This lists parties that won seats. See the complete results below.
Prime Minister before	Prime Minister after
Position established	Alassane Ouattara; PDCI–RDA

Parliamentary elections were held in Ivory Coast on 25 November 1990, the first since the restoration of multi-party democracy earlier in the year. Although 17 of the 25 legalised parties ran in the election, nearly half of the 490 candidates were from the former sole legal party, the Democratic Party of Ivory Coast – African Democratic Rally (PDCI). The PDCI won a landslide victory, taking 163 of 175 seats with 72% of the vote. Only two other parties (plus two independents) got into the legislature, winning just 12 seats between them. Voter turnout was 42%.

== Results ==
Party	Votes	%	Seats	+/–
Democratic Party of Ivory Coast	1,324,549	71.68	163	–12
Ivorian Popular Front	365,999	19.81	9	New
Ivorian Workers' Party	157,264	8.51	1	New
Independents	157,264	8.51	2	New
Total	1,847,812	100.00	175	0
Valid votes	1,847,812	98.69		
Invalid/blank votes	24,480	1.31		
Total votes	1,872,292	100.00		
Registered voters/turnout	4,408,810	42.47		
Source: Nohlen et al.
