= Chantal Camara =

Ivorian judge

Chantal Camara Nanaba
- Citizenship: Ivorian
- Occupation: Judge
- Notable work: President of the Court of Cassation (2019), President of the Superior Council of the Judiciary (2020)
- Title: President of the Constitutional Council
- Awards: National Order of the Ivory Coast

Chantal Camara Nanaba is an Ivorian judge. In April 2019, she was made president of the Court of Cassation, joining the other three judges Pierre Kobo Claver, Koné Mamadou and Francis Wodié. In May 2020 she became president of the Superior Council of the Judiciary. President of the republic, Alassane Ouattara, appointed her to a term of three years. She has received the highest honour bestowed by the state, the National Order of the Ivory Coast. On May 9, 2023, while she was a magistrate outside the hierarchy of group 1 single level, she was appointed President of the Constitutional Council by decree for a non-renewable term of six years. She succeeded Mamadou Koné after a two-year vacancy caused by "politico-judicial imbroglio" and took office on July 21, 2023.
