= 2012 Ivorian coup attempt =

Date	June 12, 2012
Location	Ivory Coast
Result	Failure of the coup attempt

Belligerents
Armed Forces of the Republic of Ivory Coast	(Ivory Coast) Dissenting faction of the armed forces (Ivory Coast) pro-Gbagbo militias (Liberia) Liberian mercenaries

Commanders and leaders
(Ivory Coast) Alassane Ouattara	(Ivory Coast) Laurent Gbagbo (Ivory Coast) Kate Gnotua (Ivory Coast) Moise Lida Kouassi

The 2012 Ivorian coup attempt was a failed coup d'état by exiled military officers loyal to former president Laurent Gbagbo to overthrow President Alassane Ouattara's administration in the Ivory Coast. State security seized documents that outlined plans for the eventual overthrow and replacement of the democratically elected leader with a transitional military council.

== Plot ==
In a public interview to national television, Interior Minister Hamed Bakayoko accused pro-Gbagbo officers and former members of his administration of complicity in the plot to install a transitional military council, disclosing "We had very specific information that a group of officers in exile in Accra were preparing a military operation in Ivory Coast aimed at destabilizing the country." He then proceeded to play a recorded video where a group of uniformed men, led by a spokesman, proclaimed the dissolution of the Ivory Coast's institutions and the establishment of a council for national sovereignty. The spokesman, later identified as Colonel Kate Gnotua, announces in the video, "All state institutions are hereby dissolved. All political activities are suspended. A curfew has been put in place until further notice." The recorded video was intended to be broadcast to national television after the takeover.

Among the alleged leaders of the foiled coup plot were Moise Lida Kouassi, former defense minister and key ally of Laurent Gbagbo, and Colonel Kate Gnotua, former senior officer in Gbagbo's presidential guard. Kouassi later had a falling out with Kate Gnotua.

The coup plot involved a combination of Liberian mercenaries and Ivorian militias, with ties to Gbagbo's loyalists. The coup attempt was linked to recent violence, including the killing of seven UN peacekeepers, and involved elements from Gbagbo's presidential guard.

In the end several of the coup plotters were arrested, including Kate Gnatoa and Kouassi, who acknowledged awareness to the plot, admitting "The documents that were seized during my arrest at my house in Lome did concern a transition and a crisis communication in Ivory Coast." He expresses regret for not informing the authorities sooner and indicated willingness to seek forgiveness from the president for his inaction.
