= Martial Joseph Ahipeaud =

Ivorian political and pro-democracy leader and activist

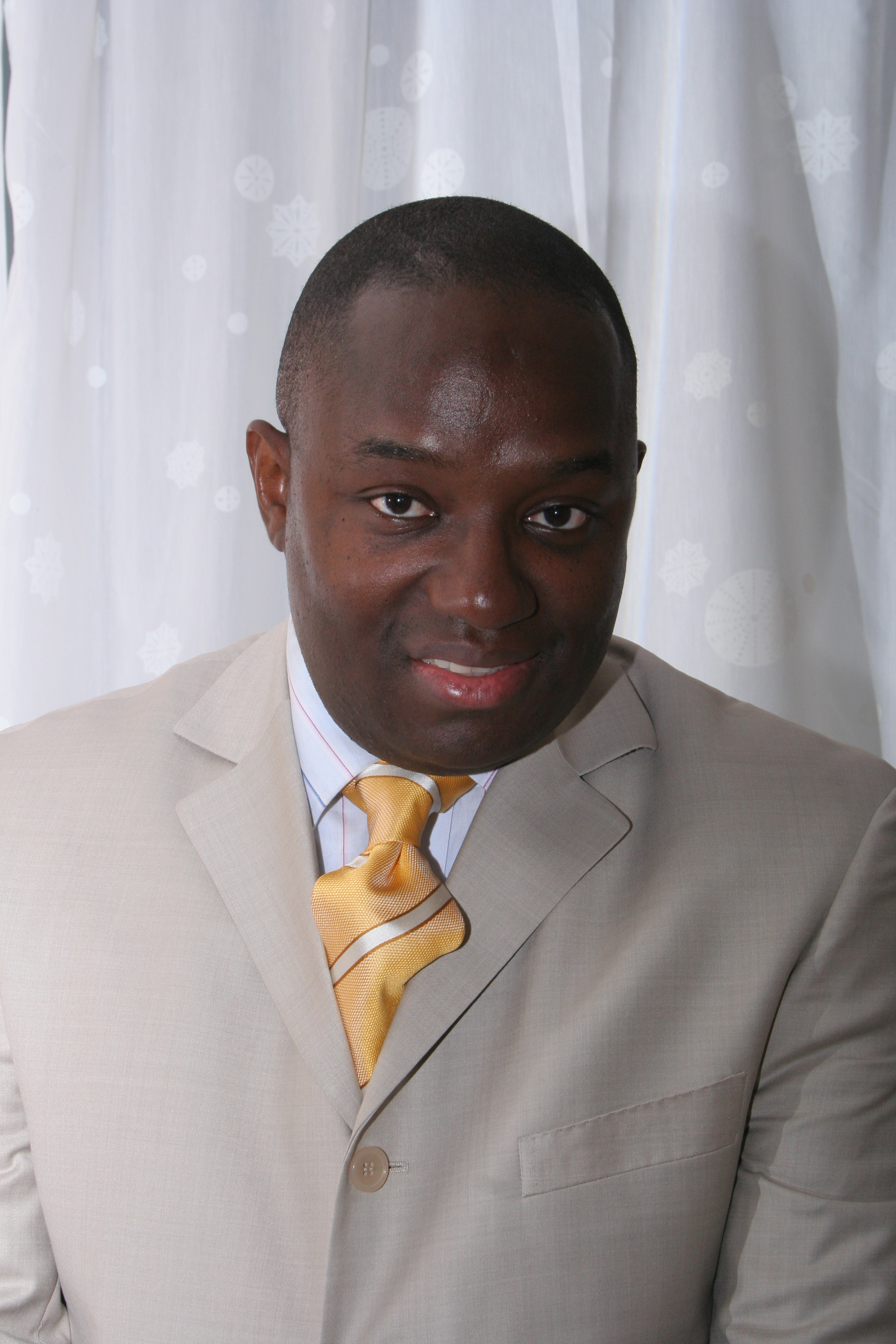
Martial Ahipeaud

Martial Joseph Ahipeaud (born 29 June 1966 in Lakota) is an Ivorian politician. A founding member of the Fédération estudiantine et scolaire de Côte d'Ivoire (FESCI) formed in 1990 of which he became the first Secretary General, he is the president of the Union for Development and Liberties (UDL) since 2006. Ahipeaud was also adviser to President Robert Guéï from 2000 to 2002.

As a consultant of international relations and intermediation, Ahipeaud is also a university teacher.

Married, and father of five children, he is a lecturer in the School of Oriental and African Studies at the University of London. His thesis dealt with "The Ideology of Elite Ivorians - Press and Politics of 1944 to 1999"

Ahipeaud advocated the "third way" concerning his political party, the UDL.

On 28 September 2021 Martial Ahipeaud, co-founder and former secretary general of the Student and School Federation of Côte d'Ivoire (Fesci), announced that he was now a member of the Democratic Party of Côte d'Ivoire (PDCI).
