= Théodore Mel Eg =

Ivorian politician (1952–2019)

Théodore Mel Eg (10 July 1952 – 11 July 2019) was an Ivorian politician who served as Minister of Culture and Francophonie.
