= Léon Konan Koffi =

Ivorian politician

- Born: 16 November 1928; Grand-Lahou, Ivory Coast
- Died: 29 August 2017 (aged 88); Abidjan, Ivory Coast
- Education: École nationale de la France d'Outre-Mer
- Occupation: Politician
- Known for: Interior Minister of the Ivory Coast
- Children: 9

Léon Konan Koffi (16 November 1928 – 29 August 2017) was an Ivorian politician. He served as the Interior Minister of the Ivory Coast under President Félix Houphouët-Boigny. He was a commander of the National Order of Merit and the Legion of Honour.
