= Ministry of Higher Education and Scientific Research (Ivory Coast) =

The Ministry of Higher Education and Scientific Research (French: Ministère de l'Enseignement supérieur et de la Recherche scientifique, MESRS) is a ministry of the Ivory Coast (Côte d'Ivoire).

== See also ==
- Education in Ivory Coast
