= 1995 Ivorian presidential election =

- 22 October 1995
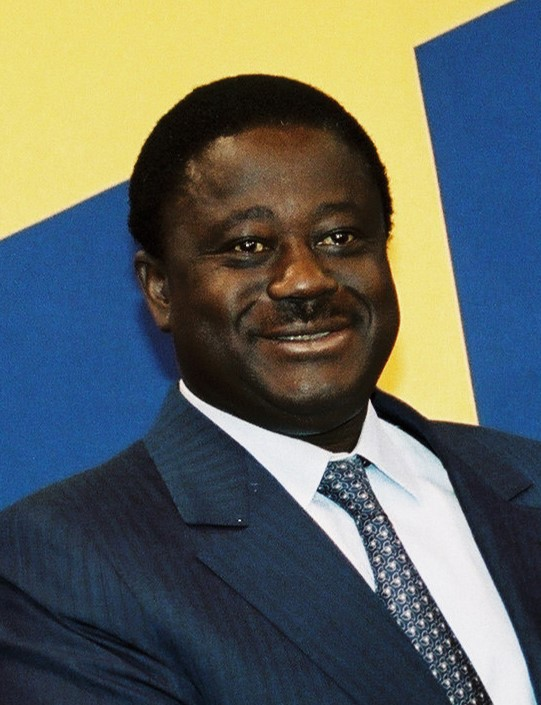

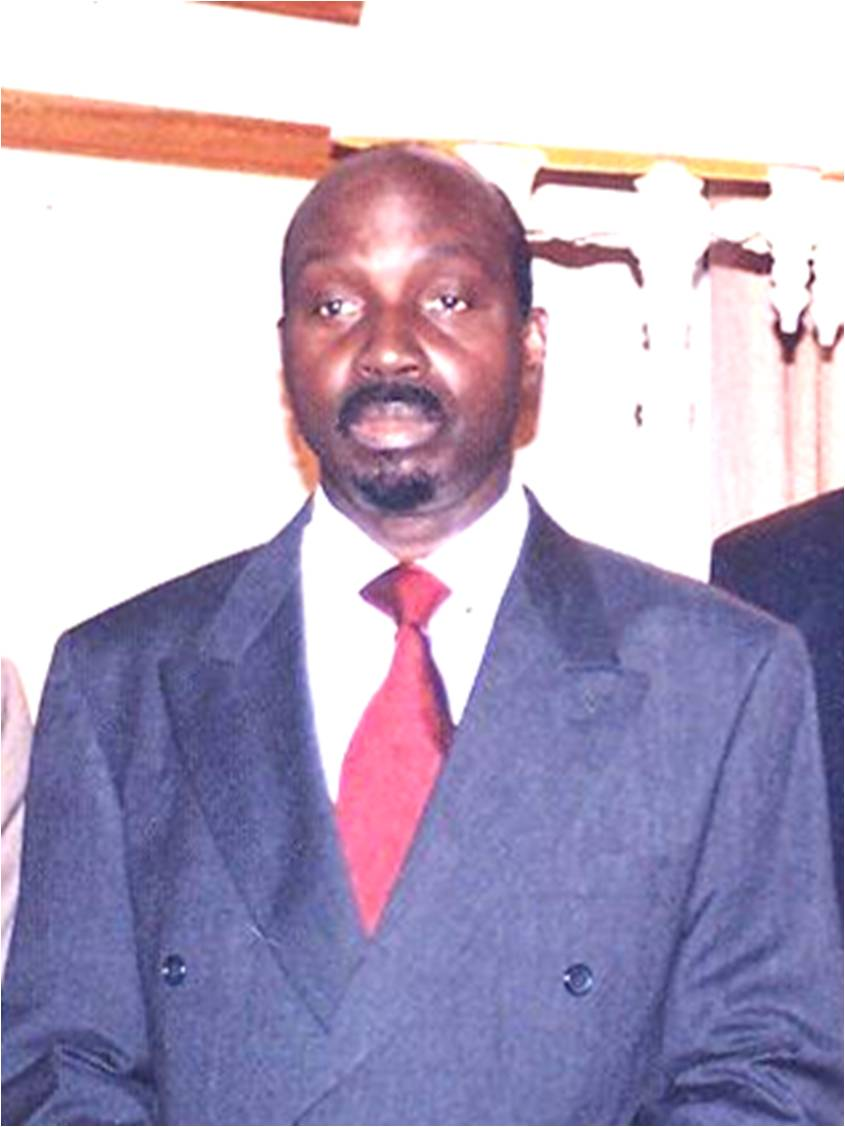
Nominee	Henri Konan Bédié	Francis Wodié
Party	PDCI–RDA	PIT
Popular vote	1,837,154	75,699
Percentage	96.04%	3.96%
President before election
Henri Konan Bédié
PDCI–RDA
Elected President
Henri Konan Bédié
PDCI–RDA

Presidential elections were held in Ivory Coast on 22 October 1995. They were boycotted by the main opposition parties, the Ivorian Popular Front and the Rally of the Republicans, in protest of new electoral rules that the opposition deemed unfair. Presidential candidates were required to have been born of two Ivorian parents, and to have been resident in the country for the previous five years. These provisions appeared to have been aimed at the RDR's intended candidate, former Prime Minister Alassane Ouattara. He had been in the United States since 1990 while working for the International Monetary Fund, and there had been longstanding rumors that his father had been born in Burkina Faso.

Incumbent Henri Konan Bédié thus faced only one opponent, Francis Wodié of the tiny Ivorian Workers Party. As President of the National Assembly, Bédié had served as interim president since the death of the country's founding leader, Félix Houphouët-Boigny, in 1993. Bédié was re-elected with 96% of the vote.

== Results ==
The Constitutional Court annulled 143,845 of the 2,109,490 votes cast.

Candidate	Party	Votes	%
Henri Konan Bédié	Democratic Party of Ivory Coast – African Democratic Rally	1,837,154	96.04
Francis Wodié	Ivorian Workers' Party	75,669	3.96
Total		1,912,823	100.00
Valid votes		1,912,823	97.31
Invalid/blank votes		52,822	2.69
Total votes		1,965,645	100.00
Registered voters/turnout		3,756,926	52.32
Source: Nohlen et al.
