= Youssouf Bakayoko =

Ivorian politician (1943–2023)

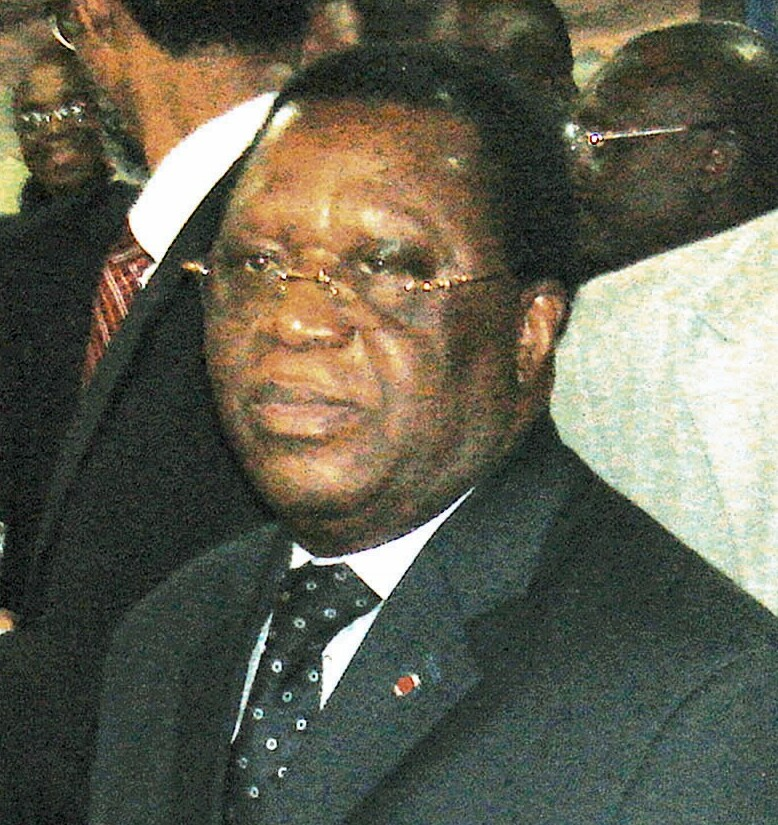

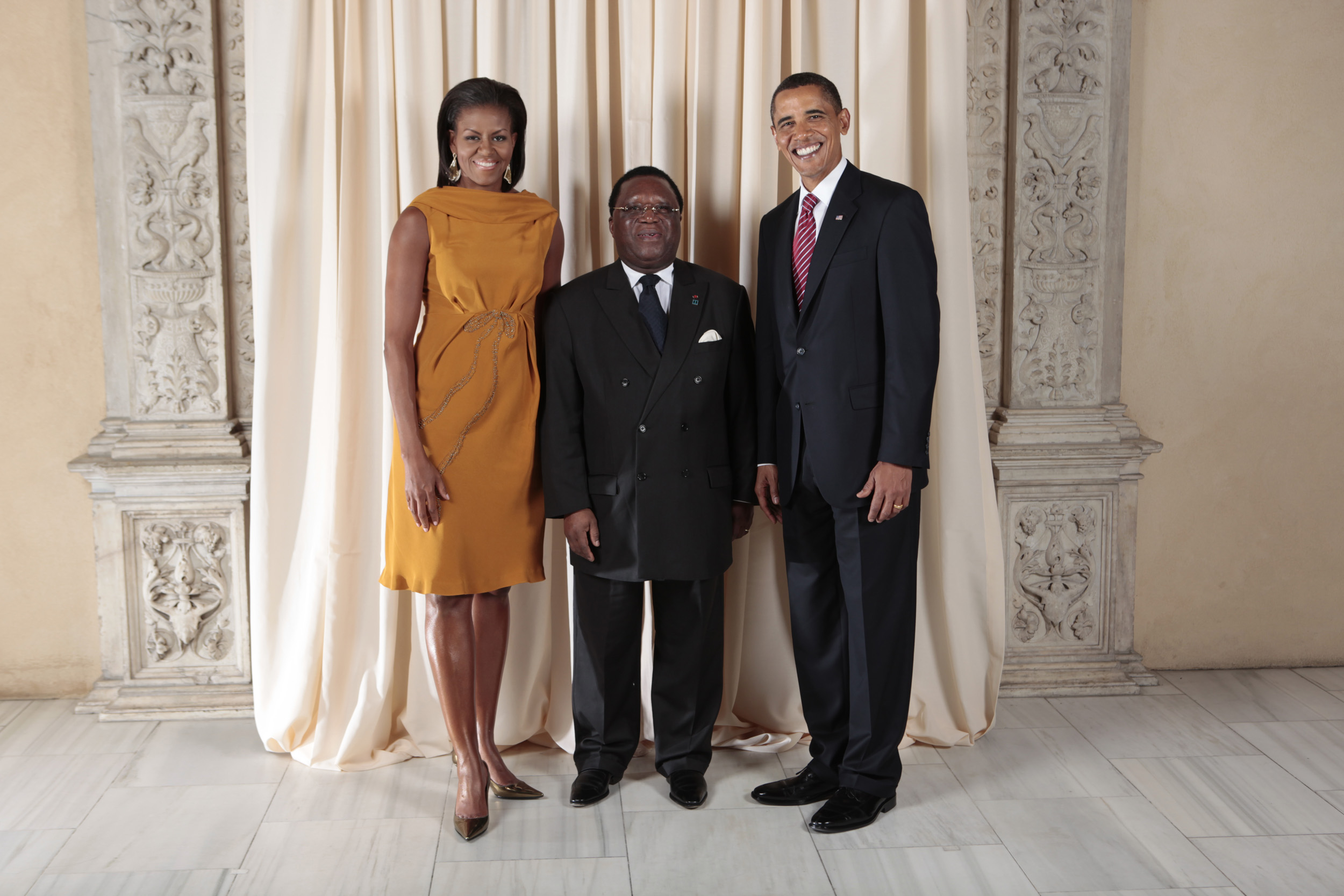
Youssouf Bakayoko with Obamas

Youssouf Bakayoko (19 April 1943 – 30 September 2023) was an Ivorian civil servant and ambassador who served in the government as Minister of Foreign Affairs from January 2006 to March 2010.

Bakayoko was president of the Ivory Coast's Independent Electoral Commission (CEI) during the 2010 Ivorian presidential election. He is known for announcing the victory of Alassane Ouattara during that election cycle.

Previously, he had been a career diplomat, holding the positions of ambassador to Ivory Coast, Switzerland, France, and Austria.

Bakayoko completed an undergraduate degree at the Paris Nanterre University in 1969. After entering the diplomatic service, he completed postgraduate studies at Graduate Institute of International Studies in Geneva and at the Institut des Hautes Etudes de la Défense Nationale in Paris, from which he graduated in 1971 and 1972 respectively.

Youssouf Bakayoko died on 30 September 2023, at the age of 80.
