= Henri Konan Bédié =

President of Côte d'Ivoire from 1993 to 1999

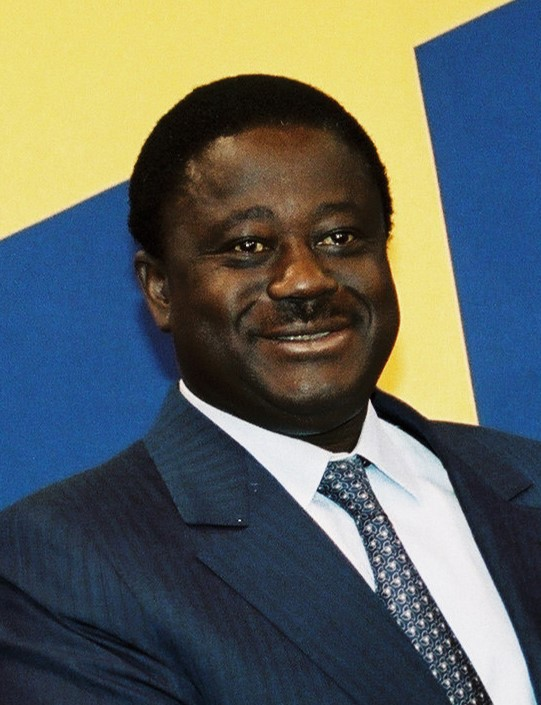
- Bédié in 1997

2nd President of Ivory Coast
- In office 7 December 1993^{[a]} – 24 December 1999
- Prime Minister: Daniel Kablan Duncan
- Preceded by: Félix Houphouët-Boigny
- Succeeded by: Robert Guéï

Personal details
- Born: 5 May 1934 Dadiékro, French West Africa
- Died: 1 August 2023 (aged 89) Abidjan, Côte d'Ivoire
- Party: PDCI–RDA
- Spouse: Henriette Koinzan Bomo (m. 1957)
- a. Acting until 22 October 1995

Aimé Henri Konan Bédié (5 May 1934 – 1 August 2023) was an Ivorian politician. He was President of Côte d'Ivoire from 1993 to 1999, and formerly President of the Democratic Party of Ivory Coast – African Democratic Rally (PDCI–RDA). Prior to becoming president, he was a member and president of the National Assembly of Ivory Coast. He unsuccessfully sought another term as president in the 2020 presidential election.

== Early life ==
Aimé Henri Konan Bédié was born in Dadiékro, Daoukro Department, on 5 May 1934. He attended school in France. Bédié married the former Henriette Koizan Bomo in 1957. The couple had four children.

== Career ==
After studying in France, he became Côte d'Ivoire's first ambassador to the United States and Canada following independence in 1960, and from 1966 to 1977, he served in the government as Minister of Economy and Finance. While serving as Finance Minister, Bédié became the first Chairman of the IMF and World Bank's joint Development Committee, holding that post from 1974 to 1976. He was Special Advisor to the World Bank Group's International Finance Corporation from 1978 to 1980.

In 1980, Bédié was elected to the National Assembly of Ivory Coast, and he was then elected as President of the National Assembly in December 1980. He was re-elected as President of the National Assembly in 1985 and 1990.

== Presidency (1993–1999) ==
As National Assembly President, Bédié stood first in the line of succession to long-time President Félix Houphouët-Boigny. He announced that he was assuming the presidency on state television a few hours after Houphouët-Boigny's death on 7 December 1993. A brief power struggle between Bédié and Prime Minister Alassane Ouattara ensued; Bédié was successful and Ouattara resigned as Prime Minister on 9 December. Bédié was subsequently elected as President of the PDCI in April 1994. Per the Constitution, he served as acting president for the balance of Houphouët-Boigny's seventh term.

As President, Bédié encouraged national stability but was accused of political repression and stratospheric levels of corruption. In the October 1995 presidential election, the electoral code was amended to require presidential candidates to have been born of two Ivorian parents and have resided in the country for five years prior to the election. These provisions were thought to have been aimed at Ouattara. He had resided in the United States since 1990 while serving as deputy managing director of the International Monetary Fund, and his father was rumored to be Burkinabe. The two main opposition parties, Ouattara's Rally of the Republicans (RDR) and the Ivorian Popular Front (FPI), decided to boycott the election, and Bédié won the election with 96% of the vote.

Bédié was overthrown in a military coup on 24 December 1999, after he rejected the demands of soldiers who rebelled on 23 December; one of these demands was for the release of members of the RDR. Retired general Robert Guéï became president. Bédié fled to a French military base before leaving Côte d'Ivoire by helicopter on 26 December and going to Togo, along with family members. Upon his arrival at the airport in Lomé, he was greeted by Togolese President Gnassingbé Eyadéma.

== Post-presidency ==
Bédié departed Togo on 3 January 2000 and went to Paris. The PDCI announced in early 2000 that it would hold a congress to choose new leadership, and Bédié denounced this as a "putsch"; the party decided to retain Bédié in the leadership, however. An international arrest warrant for Bédié and Niamien N'Goran, who had served under Bédié as Finance Minister, was issued in early June 2000 for alleged theft of public funds. Speaking on French television, Bédié said that he was not worried that he might be returned to Ivory Coast to face trial at the hands of a government that he deemed illegal, expressing his "faith in the law of France".

Bédié registered as a candidate in the October 2000 presidential election, although Emile Constant Bombet, who had served as Interior Minister under Bédié, defeated him for the PDCI presidential nomination in August. Bédié was barred from running by the Constitutional Court, along with Bombet, and on 10 October Bédié called for a boycott of the election.

On 23 June 2001, Laurent Gbagbo, who had been elected President in the 2000 election, met with Bédié in Paris and urged him to return to Ivory Coast. He eventually returned on 15 October 2001. A few days later, the 11th Ordinary Congress of the PDCI was postponed indefinitely at his request.

Bédié spoke at a national reconciliation forum on 12 November 2001. He attributed the country's political crisis to the December 1999 coup and he urged all Ivorian politicians to denounce the coup. He also said that the nationalistic concept of Ivoirité, which was promoted during his presidency, was an attempt to bolster "cultural identity" and not a means of political exclusion. According to critics of Ivoriité, it was divisive, xenophobic, and intended to eliminate political competition from Ouattara—who was claimed to be the son of Burkinabé parents—but Bédié rejected this criticism. When the PDCI Congress was eventually held in April 2002, Bédié defeated Laurent Dona Fologo for the party leadership; he received 82% of the vote.

Bédié later spent another year in France, returning to Ivory Coast on 11 September 2005. Upon his return, he said that President Gbagbo should not remain in office after the end of his term in October 2005 and that a transitional government should be installed.

In an interview with Agence France Presse on 20 May 2007, Bédié said that he would be the PDCI candidate in the next presidential election, which was then expected to be held in 2008.

Bédié addressed a rally in Dabou on 22 September 2007, in which he declared the need for a "shock treatment" to return the country to normal, promised to restore the economy, and strongly criticized Gbagbo.

In June 2020, Bédié announced that he would run in the October presidential election on behalf of the Democratic Party of Côte d'Ivoire. He came in third place, winning 1.68% of the vote.

Bédié died on 1 August 2023 at a private hospital in Abidjan, Ivory Coast, at the age of 89.

== See also ==
- First Ivorian Civil War

Political offices
| Preceded by Félix Houphouët-Boigny | President of Côte d'Ivoire; 1993–1999 | Succeeded by Robert Guéï |
