= Student Federation of Ivory Coast =

The Student Federation of Ivory Coast (French: Fédération estudiantine et scolaire de Côte d'Ivoire, FESCI) is a youth and student organization in Ivory Coast that aims to protect rights of Ivorian students at school and university.

Founded in the early 1990s as a student union, some members of the association have gone on to be involved in politics. For instance, Guillaume Soro (Secretary general of FESCI from 1995-1998), became prime minister of Ivory Coast (2007-2012) and President of the National Assembly of Ivory Coast.

On 17 October 2024, FESCI and other student unions in Ivory Coast were banned following an investigation into the killings of two people linked to FESCI general secretary, Sié Kambou, and the discovery of weapons caches and "illegal businesses" within the student housing facilities of the University of Abidjan.

FESCI is a member of the All-Africa Students Union.
