= Laurent Gbagbo =

President of Côte d'Ivoire from 2000 to 2011

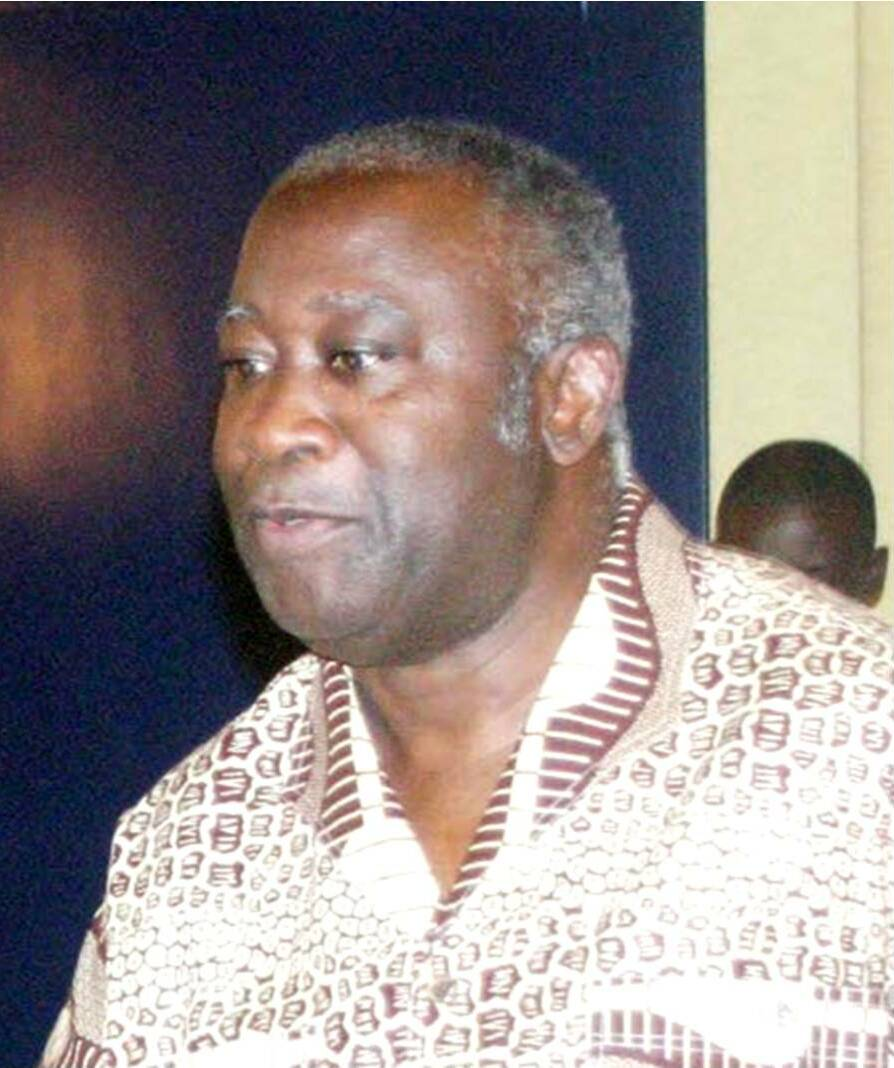
- Gbagbo in 2008

4th President of Côte d'Ivoire
- In office 26 October 2000 – 11 April 2011 (Note: The presidency was disputed between Gbagbo and Alassane Ouattara from 4 December 2010 to 11 April 2011, at which time Gbagbo was arrested by UN forces.)
- Prime Minister: Seydou Diarra; Pascal Affi N'Guessan; Seydou Diarra; Charles Konan Banny; Guillaume Soro; Gilbert Aké
- Preceded by: Robert Guéï
- Succeeded by: Alassane Ouattara

Personal details
- Born: Koudou Laurent Gbagbo; 31 May 1945 (age 81) Gagnoa, French West Africa
- Party: FPI (1982–2021); PPA–CI (since 2021)
- Spouse: Simone Gbagbo
- Education: Paris Diderot University
- Website: Official website
- Criminal information
- Criminal charge: Crimes against humanity (dismissed)

Details
- Imprisoned at: Scheveningen prison

Koudou Laurent Gbagbo (Note: Gagnoa Bété: Gbagbo [ɡ͡baɡ͡bo]; French pronunciation: [loʁɑ̃ baɡbo]) (Note: English pronunciations vary, with /ˈbæɡboʊ/ common. In Bete and other Ivorian languages, the g and b are pronounced simultaneously, as Gagnoa Bété pronunciation: [ɡ͡baɡ͡bo].) (born 31 May 1945) is an Ivorian politician who served as the president of Côte d'Ivoire from 2000 until his arrest in April 2011. He was the first president in the history of the country that was a centre-left politician. A historian, Gbagbo was imprisoned in the early 1970s and again in the early 1990s, and he lived in exile in France during much of the 1980s as a result of his union activism. Gbagbo founded the Ivorian Popular Front (FPI) in 1982 and ran unsuccessfully for president against Félix Houphouët-Boigny at the start of multi-party politics in 1990. He won a seat in the National Assembly of Côte d'Ivoire in 1990.

Gbagbo claimed victory after Robert Guéï, head of a military junta, barred other leading politicians from running in the October 2000 presidential election. The Ivorian people took to the streets, toppling Guéï. Gbagbo was then installed as president.

In the 2010 presidential election, Alassane Ouattara defeated Gbagbo, and was recognized as the winner by election observers, the international community, the African Union (AU), and the Economic Community of West African States. However, Gbagbo refused to step down, despite mounting international pressure. The Independent Electoral Commission (IEC) announced that Ouattara had won the race with 54% of the vote, a tally that the United Nations concluded was credible; however, the Constitutional Council, a body dominated by pro-Gbagbo members, annulled the results in Ouattara's electoral strongholds in the north, claiming fraud, and declared Gbagbo the winner with 51% of the vote. In December 2010, both Gbagbo and Ouattara assumed the presidency, triggering a short period of civil conflict in which about 3,000 people were killed.

Gbagbo was arrested in 2011 by pro-Ouattara forces, who were supported by French troops. Gbagbo was extradited to The Hague in November 2011, where he was charged with four counts of crimes against humanity in the International Criminal Court (ICC) in connection with the post-election violence. Gbagbo was the first former head of state to be taken into the court's custody. In January 2019, an ICC panel dismissed the charges against Gbagbo and one of his former ministers, Charles Blé Goudé, determining that the evidence presented was insufficient to prove that the pair committed crimes against humanity. Prosecutors appealed the decision, and Gbagbo was prohibited from returning to Côte d'Ivoire pending the appeal proceedings. The ICC ultimately upheld Gbagbo's acquittal, and in April 2021, Ouattara stated he and Blé Goudé were free to return to the country.

== Early life and academic career ==
Laurent Gbagbo was born on 31 May 1945 to a Roman Catholic family of the Bété people in Gagnoa in the then French West Africa. He was a high school schoolmate of Ediémou Blin Jacob. He became a history professor and an opponent of the regime of President Félix Houphouët-Boigny. He was imprisoned from 31 March 1971 to January 1973. In 1979, he obtained his doctorate at Paris Diderot University. In 1980, he became Director of the Institute of History, Art, and African Archeology at the University of Abidjan. He participated in a 1982 teachers' strike as a member of the National Trade Union of Research and Higher Education. Gbagbo went into exile in France.

== Political career ==
During the 1982 strike, Koudou Gbagbo formed what would become the Ivorian Popular Front (FPI). He returned to Côte d'Ivoire on 13 September 1988 and at the FPI's constitutive congress, held on 19–20 November 1988, he was elected as the party's Secretary-General.

Gbagbo said in July 2008 that he had received crucial support from Blaise Compaoré, formerly the President of Burkina Faso, while he was part of the underground opposition to Houphouët-Boigny.

Following the introduction of multiparty politics in 1990, Gbagbo challenged Houphouët-Boigny in the October 1990 presidential election. Gbagbo contended that Houphouët-Boigny, who was either 85 or 90 years old (depending on the source), was not likely to survive a seventh five-year term. This failed to resonate with voters, and Gbagbo officially received 18.3% of the vote against Houphouët-Boigny. In the November 1990 parliamentary election, Gbagbo won a seat in the National Assembly, along with eight other members of the FPI.

Gbagbo was elected to a seat from Ouragahio District in Gagnoa Department and was President of the FPI Parliamentary Group from 1990 to 1995. In 1992 he was sentenced to two years in prison and charged with inciting violence, but was released later in the year. The FPI boycotted the 1995 presidential election. In 1996 Gbagbo was re-elected to his seat in the National Assembly from Ouragahio, following a delay in the holding of the election there, and in the same year he was elected as President of the FPI.

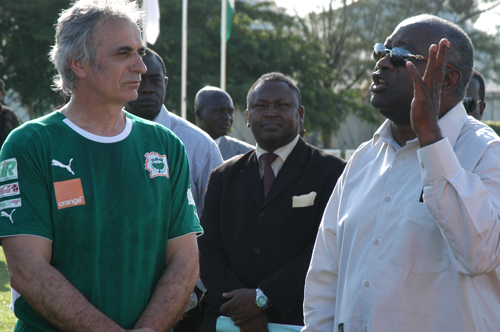
The president of Côte d'Ivoire, Laurent Gbagbo and Vahid Halilhodzic, Sol Beni, Abidjan, Côte d'Ivoire in May 2008

At the FPI's 3rd Ordinary Congress on 9–11 July 1999, Gbagbo was chosen as the FPI's candidate for the October 2000 presidential election. That election took place after a December 1999 coup in which retired general Robert Guéï took power. Guéï refused to allow his predecessor as president, Henri Konan Bédié, or former prime minister Alassane Ouattara to run, leaving Gbagbo as the only significant opposition candidate. Guéï claimed victory in the election, held on 22 October 2000. However, after it emerged that Gbagbo had actually won by a significant margin, street protests forced Guéï to flee the capital. Gbagbo installed himself as president on 26 October.

== Civil war ==
Following the contested election of 2000, there were violent clashes between supporters of the FPI and supporters of the RDR. A mass grave of 57 bodies was found in Yopougon, Abidjan, in November 2000, containing the corpses of RDR supporters killed by FPI-aligned militias. The RDR launched an electoral boycott of the December 2000 elections to the parliament. The following month, an attempted coup d'état against Gbagbo occurred. The government then intensified a crackdown on northerners and those thought to be Alassane Ouattara supporters; many were jailed or killed.

On 19 September 2002 a revolt by northerners against Gbagbo's government partly failed. The rebels, calling themselves the Forces Nouvelles, attempted to seize the cities of Abidjan, Bouaké, and Korhogo. They failed to take Abidjan, but were successful in the other two cities, as Gbagbo loyalists, with French military assistance, repulsed the attack. Rebels of the Patriotic Movement of Côte d'Ivoire took control of the northern part of the country.

In March 2003, a new cross-party agreement was made for the formation of a new government led by a consensus figure, Seydou Diarra, and including nine ministers from the rebels, and one year later, UN peacekeeping forces arrived in the country. In March 2004, however, an anti-Gbagbo rally took place in Abidjan; government soldiers responded by killing some 120 people. A subsequent UN report concluded that Ivorian government was responsible for the massacre.

== Post-Civil War ==
The peace agreement effectively collapsed in early November 2004 following elections that critics claimed were undemocratic and the rebels' subsequent refusal to disarm. During an airstrike in Bouaké on 6 November 2004, nine French soldiers were killed. While the Ivorian government has claimed the attack on the French soldiers was accidental, French governmental sources claimed it was deliberate and responded by destroying most Ivorian military aircraft.

With the late October deadline approaching in 2006, it was regarded as very unlikely that the election would in fact be held by that point, and the opposition and the rebels rejected the possibility of another term extension for Gbagbo. The UN Security Council endorsed another one-year extension of Gbagbo's term on 1 November 2006; to not forget, many of the rebels held their guns and were prepared to advance again, however, the resolution provided for the strengthening of Prime Minister Charles Konan Banny's powers. Gbagbo said the next day that elements of the resolution deemed to be constitutional violations would not be applied.

A peace deal between the government and the rebels, or New Forces, was signed on 4 March 2007, in Ouagadougou, Burkina Faso, and subsequently Guillaume Soro, leader of the New Forces, became prime minister. Those events were seen by some observers as substantially strengthening Gbagbo's position.

Gbagbo visited the north for the first time since the outbreak of the war for a disarmament ceremony, the "peace flame", on 30 July 2007. This ceremony involved burning weapons to symbolize the end of the conflict. At the ceremony, Gbagbo declared the war over and said that the country should move quickly to elections, which were then planned for early 2008.

On 30 August 2008, Gbagbo was designated the FPI's candidate for the November 2008 presidential election at a party congress; he was the only candidate for the FPI nomination. The presidential election was again postponed to 2010.

== 2010 presidential election and post-election violence ==
In 2010, Côte d'Ivoire had a presidential election. Gbagbo, whose mandate had expired in 2005, had delayed the election several times. In the first round, Gbagbo faced 14 challengers; the two main ones were Henri Konan Bédié, who had been deposed in a coup eleven years earlier, and Alassane Ouattara, a former prime minister and IMF official. In the first round, no candidate secured a majority of more than 50%, triggering a runoff between the top two vote-getters: Gbagbo (who had received 38% of the vote in the first round) and Ouattara (who received 32% of the vote in the first round).

On 28 November 2010, the second round of the presidential election was held. Four days later the Independent Election Commission (CEI) declared Ouattara the winner with 54.1% of the vote. Gbagbo's party complained of fraud and ordered that votes from nine regions occupied by the ex-rebels "became FN after the Ouagadougou agreement" be annulled, but the claims were disputed by the Ivorian Electoral Commission and international election observers. The Constitutional Council nullified the CEI's declaration based on alleged voting fraud, and excluded votes from nine northern areas.

The Constitutional Council concluded that without these votes Gbagbo won with 51% of the remaining vote. The constitutional restriction on Presidents serving more than ten years was not addressed. With a significant portion of the country's vote nullified, especially in areas where Ouattara polled well, tensions mounted in the country. Gbagbo ordered the army to close the borders and foreign news organizations were banned from broadcasting from within the country. United States Secretary of State Hillary Clinton urged the government to "act responsibly and peacefully."

Gbagbo declared that "I will continue to work with all the countries of the world, but I will never give up our sovereignty." On 4 December 2010, one day after military leadership pledged their continuing loyalty to him, Gbagbo again took the oath of office in a ceremony broadcast on state television. Gbagbo's claim to continue in office was not accepted internationally, and rejected by France, the U.S., the United Nations, the African Union, and the regional bloc ECOWAS, all of which recognized Ouattara as the duly elected president and called for Gbagbo to respect the will of the people.

Gbagbo responded by launching ethnic attacks on northerners living in Abidjan with his army made up partly of Liberian mercenaries, and rumours (unconfirmed because of restrictions on the movement of peacekeeping forces) of pro-Gbagbo death squads and mass graves have been reported to representatives of the UN. Gbagbo is mainly supported by the largely Christian south; his opponents are mostly concentrated in the Muslim north. When Nigeria demanded Gbagbo step down and the EU began imposing sanctions and freezing assets, Gbagbo demanded that UN peacekeepers and French troops leave the country. Leaders of the Forces Nouvelles (former rebels) asserted that Gbagbo was not the head of state and could not make such a request and also asserted that the demand was a part of a plan to commit genocide against northerners, as stated by Gbagbo's Minister of Youth and Employment.

The ensuing post-election violence resulted in the death of 3,000 people, and the displacement of between a half-million to a million other people. On 11 April 2011, forces loyal to Ouattara supported by the French and UN forces moved to seize Gbagbo at his residence in Abidjan after failed negotiations to end the presidential succession crisis. According to Ouattara, his forces established a security perimeter at the residence, where Gbagbo had sought refuge in a subterranean level, and were waiting for him to run out of food and water. The UN had insisted that he be arrested, judged and tried for crimes against humanity during his term and since the election of Ouattara.

=== Arrest and transfer to the International Criminal Court ===
On 10 April 2011, UN and French helicopters fired rockets at the presidential residence. French special forces assisted forces loyal to Ouattara, the internationally recognized president, in their advance upon the compound. Gbagbo was captured in the bunker below the compound and placed under arrest by the Ouattara forces. Gbagbo's lawyer stated that the government forces were able to storm the residence after French troops blasted a wall, opening up a "getaway" tunnel that had been dug on the orders of Gbagbo's predecessor, Félix Houphouët-Boigny, and subsequently walled up by Gbagbo.

Gbagbo was held in the Golf Hotel in Abidjan by Ouattara's forces, and requested protection from UN peacekeepers. Speaking from the hotel, Gbagbo told the regular armies to stop fighting. U.S. President Barack Obama welcomed news of the developments and CNN quoted U.S. Secretary of State Hillary Clinton as saying that Gbagbo's capture "sends a strong signal to dictators and tyrants. ... They may not disregard the voice of their own people".

In October 2011, the International Criminal Court opened an investigation into acts of violence committed during the conflict after the election, and ICC chief prosecutor Luis Moreno Ocampo visited the country. The following month, the ICC formally issued an arrest warrant for Gbagbo, charging him with four counts of crimes against humanity – murder, rape and other forms of sexual violence, persecution and other inhuman acts allegedly committed between 16 December 2010 and 12 April 2011.

Gbagbo was arrested in Korhogo, where he had been placed under house arrest, and was placed on a flight to The Hague on 29 November 2011. An adviser to Gbagbo described the arrest as "victors' justice". Conversely, human rights groups hailed Gbagbo's arrest while also stating that pro-Ouattara forces that committed crimes should also be held accountable.

In 2012, Gbagbo's former budget minister Justin Kone Katinan, a close Gbagbo ally, was arrested on an international warrant in Accra, Ghana, on charges of robbery arising from looting of banks in Ivory Coast. The following year, a Ghanaian magistrate rejected the extradition request, determining that the warrant issued by the Ivorian government was politically motivated.

=== Proceedings in the ICC and acquittal ===
The confirmation of charges hearing was scheduled for 18 June 2012, but was postponed to 13 August 2012, to give his defense team more time to prepare. The hearing was then postponed indefinitely, citing concerns over Gbagbo's health.

Gbagbo's trial at the ICC began on 28 January 2016, where he denied all charges against him; crimes against humanity including murder, rape and persecution, as did his co-accused Charles Blé Goudé. Due to presenting a flight risk and maintaining a network of supporters, judges ordered him to remain in detention during his trial. From January 2016 to January 2018, ICC prosecutors presented the testimony of 82 witnesses and thousands of pieces of evidence. Gbagbo filed a "no case to answer" motion in July 2018, and hearings were held in November 2018.

On 15 January 2019 Gbagbo and Goudé were acquitted by an ICC panel and their release was ordered. Presiding Judge Cuno Tarfusser and Judge Geoffrey Henderson ruled in favor of release; Judge Olga Carbuccia issued a dissenting opinion.

Many within the Ivory Coast celebrated Gbagbo's acquittal. Amnesty International called the acquittal of Gbagbo and Blé Goudé "a crushing disappointment to victims of post-election violence in Cote d'Ivoire" but noted that the Office of the Prosecutor was likely to appeal. The proceedings against Gbagbo were the first against a head of state undertaken by the ICC, and the failure of the ICC to convict Gbagbo for the mass atrocities was said by analysts to significantly impair the credibility of the ICC as a court of last resort.

=== Appeal ===
The ICC (International Criminal Court) panel ordered Gbagbo's immediate release, but the ICC Appeals Chamber ordered that Gbagbo remain in custody pending consideration of ICC prosecutors' appeal against Gbagbo's acquittal. On 1 February 2019, he was released after ICC Appeals Chamber granted Gbagbo conditional release from detention; he was allowed to live in Belgium, but had to be available to return to court, and could not leave Belgium. Gbagbo's lawyers then petitioned the ICC for Gbagbo's unconditional release.

On 28 May 2020, the International Criminal Court gave Gbagbo permission to leave Belgium if certain conditions were met. At the time, it was unclear if he would be allowed to return to Côte d'Ivoire.

On 30 October 2020, Gbagbo said the 2020 Ivorian presidential election spells "disaster" for the country, in his first public comments since being toppled in 2011. He gave the interview in Belgium, where he was awaiting the outcome of proceedings against him.

In March 2021, the ICC upheld Gbagbo's acquittal. Shortly afterwards, Ouattara stated he was able to return to Côte d'Ivoire freely.

=== Return to Ivory Coast ===
After his acquittal was confirmed, current Ivorian President Alassane Ouattara, Gbagbo's rival, invited him back to Côte d'Ivoire. He arrived in Abidjan on 17 June 2021, on a commercial flight from Brussels, where he had been living for the previous three years after being released from detention. Ouattara arranged him a diplomatic passport, and promised him the benefits that are typically given to ex-presidents, including state-provided security and a state pension.

Six of Gbagbo's former allies also returned after spending years in exile after being encouraged by the current president Ouattara. Gbagbo launched a new political party in October 2021 called the African People's Party – Cote d'Ivoire (PPA-CI). He travelled to Ghana in December 2021 to attend the funeral of Kojo Tsikata, and visited Ivorian exiles who sought asylum there following the post-election crisis.

He said in March 2024 that he would run again for president as leader of the PPA-CI in the 2025 Ivorian presidential election. However, he was not included in the final list of candidates released in June 2025. He filed a case at the African Court on Human and Peoples' Rights, accusing the Ivorian government of violating his rights by rejecting his candidacy over his criminal conviction, but the case was dismissed by the court.

== Honours ==
- Ivory Coast:
  - Collar of the National Order of the Ivory Coast

== See also ==
- Politics of Côte d'Ivoire
- First Ivorian Civil War
- Second Ivorian Civil War

== Notes ==
Political offices
Preceded by Robert Guéï	President of the Ivory Coast; 2000–2011	Succeeded by Alassane Ouattara
