= Brou-Akpaoussou =

- Village
- Location in Ivory Coast
- Coordinates: 6°54′N 4°3′W
- Country: Ivory Coast
- District: Lacs
- Region: Moronou
- Department: Bongouanou
- Sub-prefecture: Andé
- Time zone: UTC+0 (GMT)

Brou-Akpaoussou is a village in eastern Ivory Coast. It is in the sub-prefecture of Andé, Bongouanou Department, Moronou Region, Lacs District.

Brou-Akpaoussou was a commune until March 2012, when it became one of 1,126 communes nationwide that were abolished.
