= N'Gohinou =

- Village
- Location in Ivory Coast
- Coordinates: 6°32′N 4°31′W
- Country: Ivory Coast
- District: Lacs
- Region: Moronou
- Department: M'Batto
- Sub-prefecture: Tiémélékro
- Time zone: UTC+0 (GMT)

N'Gohinou is a village in central Ivory Coast. It is in the sub-prefecture of Tiémélékro, M'Batto Department, Moronou Region, Lacs District.

N'Gohinou was a commune until March 2012, when it became one of 1,126 communes nationwide that were abolished.
