= Brou-Ahoussoukro =

- Village
- Location in Ivory Coast
- Coordinates: 6°50′N 4°32′W
- Country: Ivory Coast
- District: Lacs
- Region: N'Zi
- Department: Dimbokro
- Sub-prefecture: Diangokro
- Time zone: UTC+0 (GMT)

Brou-Ahoussoukro is a village in central Ivory Coast. It is in the sub-prefecture of Diangokro, Dimbokro Department, N'Zi Region, Lacs District.

Brou-Ahoussoukro was a commune until March 2012, when it became one of 1,126 communes nationwide that were abolished.
