= Bonab (disambiguation) =

Bonab, Ban Ab, Banab, Benab, Binab, or Bunab may refer to:

== Places ==
=== Iran ===
East Azerbaijan province

- Bonab, a city and capital of Bonab County
- Bonab Jadid, a city and the site of a nuclear research center
- Bonab County
- Bonab Rural District (Marand County)

Fars province

- Bonab, Darab, a village in Darab County

Hormozgan province

- Bonab, Hormozgan, a village in Hajjiabad County

Kerman province

- Ban Ab, Kerman, a village in Baft County

Zanjan province

- Binab, Zanjan, a village in Zanjan County
- Bonab Rural District (Zanjan County)

=== Ivory Coast ===
- Banabo, also known Banab, a village in Lacs District

=== Kenya ===
- Bunaba also Bunab, a town in Western Province

== Other uses ==
- BunaB, a novelty device
