= N'Zué-Kokoré =

- Village
- Location in Ivory Coast
- Coordinates: 6°37′N 4°14′W
- Country: Ivory Coast
- District: Lacs
- Region: Moronou
- Department: Bongouanou
- Sub-prefecture: N'Guessankro
- Time zone: UTC+0 (GMT)

N'Zué-Kokoré is a village in central Ivory Coast. It is in the sub-prefecture of N'Guessankro, Bongouanou Department, Moronou Region, Lacs District.

N'Zué-Kokoré was a commune until March 2012, when it became one of 1,126 communes nationwide that were abolished.
