= Konan-N'Drikro =

Konan-N'Drikro Konandrikro
- Village
- Location in Ivory Coast
- Coordinates: 7°14′N 4°28′W
- Country: Ivory Coast
- District: Lacs
- Region: N'Zi
- Department: Bocanda
- Sub-prefecture: Bocanda
- Time zone: UTC+0 (GMT)

Konan-N'Drikro (also spelled Konandrikro) is a village in central Ivory Coast. It is in the sub-prefecture of Bocanda, Bocanda Department, N'Zi Region, Lacs District.

Konan-N'Drikro was a commune until March 2012, when it became one of 1,126 communes nationwide that were abolished.
