= Adouakouakro =

- Village
- Location in Ivory Coast
- Coordinates: 6°36′N 4°26′W
- Country: Ivory Coast
- District: Lacs
- Region: Moronou
- Department: M'Batto
- Sub-prefecture: Assahara
- Time zone: UTC+0 (GMT)

Adouakouakro is a village in Ivory Coast. It is in the sub-prefecture of Assahara, M'Batto Department, Moronou Region, Lacs District.

Adouakouakro was a commune until March 2012, when it became one of 1,126 communes nationwide that were abolished.
