= Assalé-Kouassikro =

- Village
- Location in Ivory Coast
- Coordinates: 6°58′N 3°54′W
- Country: Ivory Coast
- District: Lacs
- Region: Moronou
- Department: Arrah
- Sub-prefecture: Krégbé
- Time zone: UTC+0 (GMT)

Assalé-Kouassikro is a village in eastern Ivory Coast. It is in the sub-prefecture of Krégbé, Arrah Department, Moronou Region, Lacs District.

Assalé-Kouassikro was a commune until March 2012, when it became one of 1,126 communes nationwide that were abolished.
