= Léon Emmanuel Monnet =

Ivorian politician (born 1952)

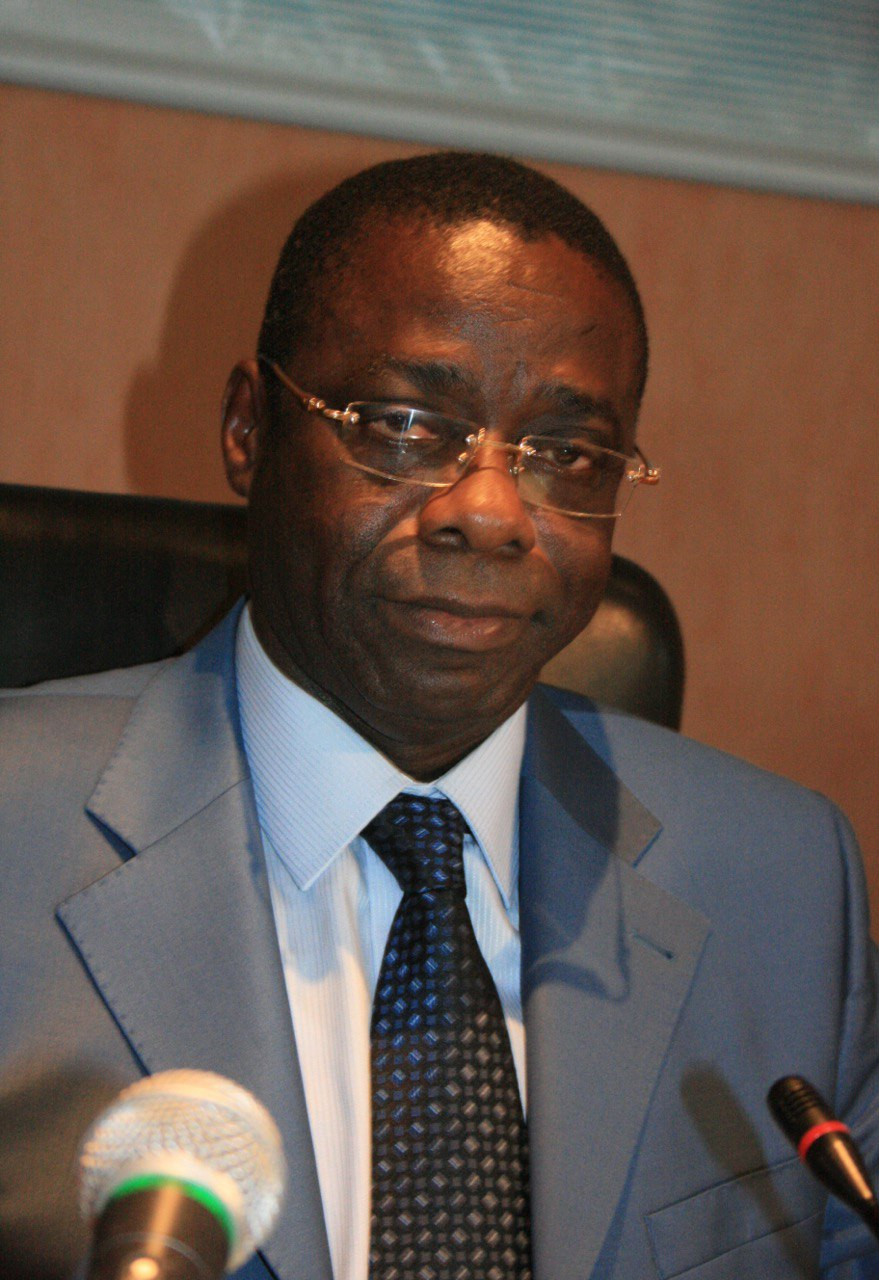

Minister of Mines and Energy
- In office 26 October 2000 – 23 February 2000
- President: Laurent Gbagbo
- Prime Minister: Seydou Diarra; Pascal Affi N'Guessan; Seydou Diarra; Charles Konan Banny; Guillaume Soro
- Preceded by: Moussa Touré
- Succeeded by: Augustin Komoe Kouadio

Minister of Technical Education and Vocational Training
- In office 4 January 2000 – 26 October 2000
- President: Robert Guéï
- Prime Minister: Seydou Diarra
- Preceded by: Dossongui Koné

Mayor of Adzopé

Personal details
- Born: 18 April 1952 (age 74) Adzopé, French West Africa (now the present-day Central African Republic)
- Spouse: Agnès Monnet

Léon Emmanuel Monnet (born 18 April 1952) is the Minister of Mines and Energy of Côte d'Ivoire and the mayor of Adzopé. He is a member of the Ivorian Popular Front (FPI).
