= Banabo =

Banabo Banab
- Village
- Location in Ivory Coast
- Coordinates: 6°42′N 4°18′W
- Country: Ivory Coast
- District: Lacs
- Region: Moronou
- Department: Bongouanou
- Sub-prefecture: N'Guessankro
- Time zone: UTC+0 (GMT)

Banabo (also known as Banab) is a village in eastern Ivory Coast. It is in the sub-prefecture of N'Guessankro, Bongouanou Department, Moronou Region, Lacs District.

Banabo was a commune until March 2012, when it became one of 1,126 communes nationwide that were abolished.
