= Soungassou =

- Village
- Location in Ivory Coast
- Coordinates: 6°38′N 4°37′W
- Country: Ivory Coast
- District: Lacs
- Region: N'Zi
- Department: Dimbokro
- Sub-prefecture: Dimbokro
- Time zone: UTC+0 (GMT)

Soungassou is a village in central Ivory Coast. It is in the sub-prefecture of Dimbokro, Dimbokro Department, N'Zi Region, Lacs District.

Soungassou was a commune until March 2012, when it became one of 1,126 communes nationwide that were abolished.
