= N'Gbribo =

N'Gribo
- Village
- Location in Ivory Coast
- Coordinates: 6°36′N 4°26′W
- Country: Ivory Coast
- District: Lacs
- Region: Moronou
- Department: M'Batto
- Sub-prefecture: Anoumaba
- Time zone: UTC+0 (GMT)

N'Gribo is a village in central Ivory Coast. It is in the sub-prefecture of Anoumaba, M'Batto Department, Moronou Region, Lacs District.

Until 2012, N'Gribo was in the commune of N'Gribo-Takikro. In March 2012, N'Gribo-Takikro became one of 1,126 communes nationwide that were abolished.
