= N'Zi-Comoé =

Coordinates: 7°15′N 4°10′W

N'Zi-Comoé Region Région du N'Zi-Comoé
- Defunct region of Ivory Coast
- 1997–2011
- Location of N'Zi-Comoé Region in Ivory Coast
- Capital: Dimbokro
- Area
- 19,242 km^{2} (7,429 sq mi)
- History
  - Established as a first-level subdivision: 1997
  - Disestablished: 2011
- Today part of: Iffou, Moronou, and N'Zi Regions

N'Zi-Comoé Region is a defunct region of Ivory Coast. From 1997 to 2011, it was a first-level subdivision region. The region's capital was Dimbokro and its area was 19,242 km^{2}. Since 2011, the area formerly encompassed by the region is part of Lacs District.

== Administrative divisions ==
At the time of its dissolution, N'Zi-Comoé Region was divided into eight departments: Arrah, Bocanda, Bongouanou, Daoukro, Dimbokro, M'Bahiakro, M'Batto, and Prikro.

== Abolition ==
N'Zi Comoé Region was abolished as part of the 2011 administrative reorganisation of the subdivisions of Ivory Coast. The area formerly encompassed by the region is now part of Lacs District. The territories of the departments of Daoukro, M'Bahiakro, and Prikro became the second-level Iffou Region. The remaining territory—the departments of Bocanda, Bongouanou and Dimbokro—became N'Zi Region. Later, in 2012, Moronou Region was created from what had previously been the territory of Bongouanou Department in N'Zi-Comoé Region.
