= Katchiré-Essékro =

Katchiré-Essékro Katiré-Essékro
- Village
- Location in Ivory Coast
- Coordinates: 7°2′N 4°36′W
- Country: Ivory Coast
- District: Lacs
- Region: N'Zi
- Department: Bocanda
- Sub-prefecture: Bocanda
- Time zone: UTC+0 (GMT)

Katchiré-Essékro (also spelled Katiré-Essékro) is a village in central Ivory Coast. It is in the sub-prefecture of Bocanda, Bocanda Department, N'Zi Region, Lacs District.

Katchiré-Essékro was a commune until March 2012, when it became one of 1,126 communes nationwide that were abolished.
