= N'Zécrézessou =

- Town and sub-prefecture
- Location in Ivory Coast
- Coordinates: 7°4′N 4°17′W
- Country: Ivory Coast
- District: Lacs
- Region: N'Zi
- Department: Bocanda

Population (2014)
  - Total: 26,549
- Time zone: UTC+0 (GMT)

N'Zécrézessou is a town in east-central Ivory Coast. It is a sub-prefecture of Bocanda Department in N'Zi Region, Lacs District.

N'Zécrézessou was a commune until March 2012, when it became one of 1,126 communes nationwide that were abolished.

In 2014, the population of the sub-prefecture of N'Zécrézessou was 26,549.

== Villages ==
The 10 villages of the sub-prefecture of N'Zécrézessou and their population in 2014 are:

1. Amoroki (4,953)
2. Agba-Bayassou (4,140)
3. Assa-Kokokro (1,311)
4. Didiassa (1,472)
5. Katiéplinou (2,992)
6. Koffi-Adoukro (2,183)
7. Konan-Elékro (360)
8. Mahounou (1,540)
9. N'zécrézessou (6,135)
10. Yapi-Kouamékro (1,463)
