= Agnia =

Agnia may refer to:

- Agnia (beetle), a genus of beetles
- Agnia, Ivory Coast, a village in Lacs District, Ivory Coast
- 847 Agnia, a minor planet orbiting the Sun
- Agnia, a given name:
  - Agnia Ditkovskyte
  - Agnia Losina-Losinskaja
