= Agnès Monnet =

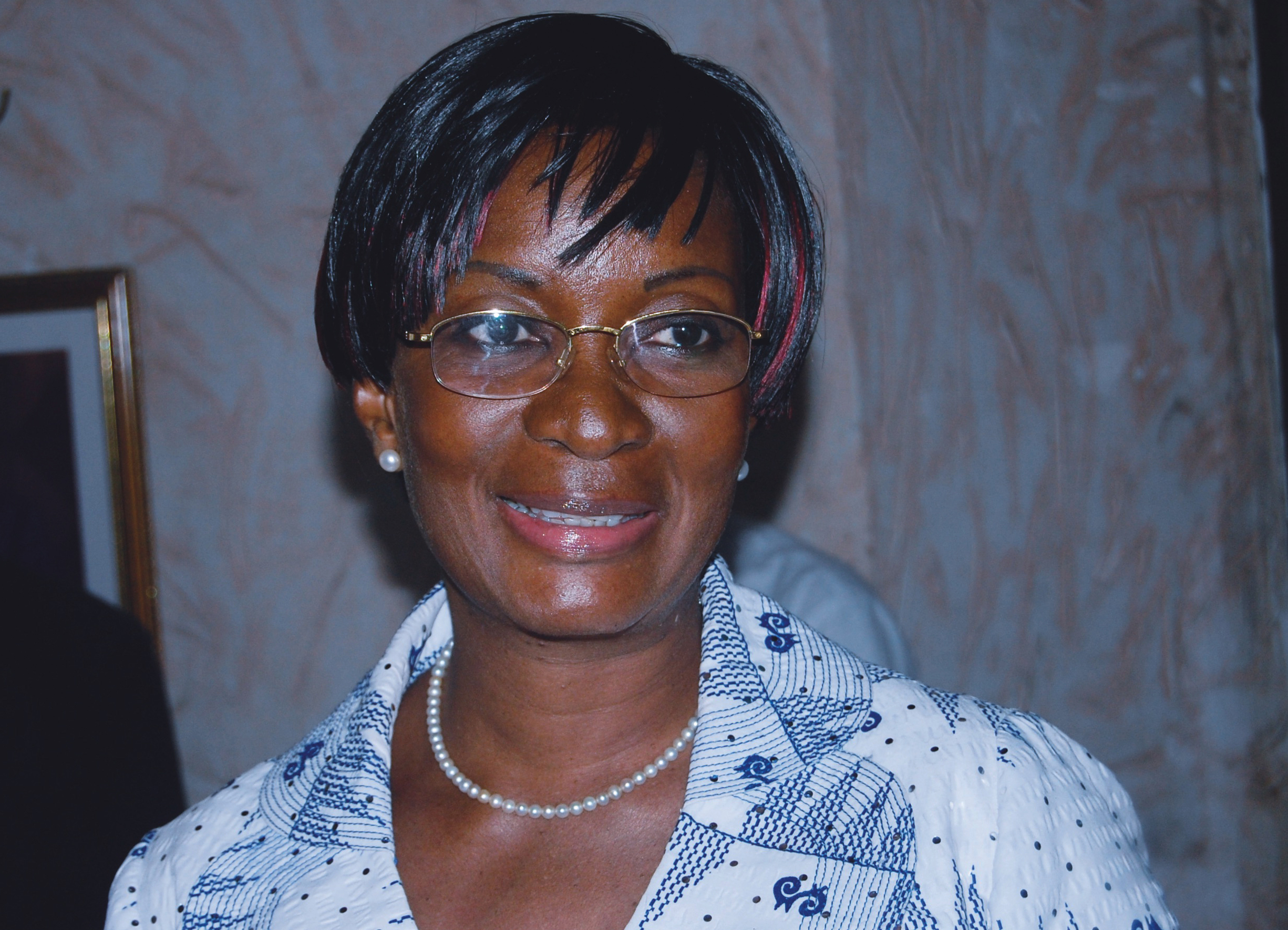
- Born: 1954 (age 71–72); Ivory Coast
- Political party: FPI
- Spouse: Léon Emmanuel Monnet

Agnès Monnet (born 1954) is an Ivorian politician, a historic member of the Ivorian Popular Front (FPI). She is married to Minister Léon Emmanuel Monnet.

== Biography ==
=== Professional experience ===
Monnet holds a Doctorate in contemporary literature (French: lettres modernes) and is an assistant professor at the Université Félix Houphouët-Boigny in Abidjan.

Monnet headed the Ivorian Agency for Francophone Cooperation (AICF) – currently the National Commission of Francophonie - from 2003 to 2011.

=== Political career ===
Monnet is one of the first women to join the FPI. She was appointed National Secretary of the FPI in charge of communication issues, particularly in organizing public events. She later replaced Laurent Akoun as Secretary-General of the FPI led by Pascal Affi N’Guessan in July 2014.

Monnet was the first female mayor of the Agou commune in the Lacs District from 2000 to 2013. She was re-elected to this position in 2018.

In March 2019, Monnet resigned from her position as Secretary-General and spokesperson of the FPI under Pascal Affi N’Guessan.
