= Kouadioblékro =

- Town and sub-prefecture
- Location in Ivory Coast
- Coordinates: 6°56′N 4°19′W
- Country: Ivory Coast
- District: Lacs
- Region: N'Zi
- Department: Bocanda

Population (2014)
  - Total: 17,287
- Time zone: UTC+0 (GMT)

Kouadioblékro is a town in east-central Ivory Coast. It is a sub-prefecture of Bocanda Department in N'Zi Region, Lacs District.

Kouadioblékro was a commune until March 2012, when it became one of 1,126 communes nationwide that were abolished.

In 2014, the population of the sub-prefecture of Kouadioblékro was 17,287.

== Villages ==
The 14 villages of the sub-prefecture of Kouadioblékro and their population in 2014 are:

1. Abéanou (3,944)
2. Aboutoukro (673)
3. Aka-Ahoussikro (692)
4. Assika-Kpolessou (1,284)
5. Attanou (767)
6. Djo-N'gattakro (381)
7. Guimbo Bayassou (1,201)
8. Guimbo Yapikro (665)
9. Koffi Konankro (721)
10. Kouadioblékro (2,436)
11. Kouassi N'zikro (2,247)
12. Ménou (559)
13. N'damien (603)
14. Proukro (1,114)
