= Abigui =

- Town and sub-prefecture
- Location in Ivory Coast
- Coordinates: 6°42′N 4°50′W
- Country: Ivory Coast
- District: Lacs
- Region: N'Zi
- Department: Dimbokro

Population (2014)
  - Total: 9,015
- Time zone: UTC+0 (GMT)

Abigui is a town in south-central Ivory Coast. It is a sub-prefecture of Dimbokro Department in N'Zi Region, Lacs District.

Abigui was a commune until March 2012, when it became one of 1,126 communes nationwide that were abolished.

In 2014, the population of the sub-prefecture of Abigui was 9,015.

== Villages ==
The 15 villages of the sub-prefecture of Abigui and their population in 2014 are:

1. Abigui (2 ,49)
2. Adahou (705)
3. Agnere-Koffikro (789)
4. Angan-Konankro (834)
5. Angouakoukro (200)
6. Assebrokro (320)
7. Asserekro (251)
8. Boni-Andokro (414)
9. Dieri-Kouassikro (153)
10. Ediakro (703)
11. Faafouet-Ettienkro (719)
12. Komien-Kouassikro (397)
13. N'ganglo (249)
14. Tiemele-Andokro (102)
15. Trianikro (1,030)
