= Bengassou =

Bengassou Bingassou
- Town and sub-prefecture
- Location in Ivory Coast
- Coordinates: 6°47′N 4°29′W
- Country: Ivory Coast
- District: Lacs
- Region: N'Zi
- Department: Bocanda

Population (2014)
  - Total: 22,891
- Time zone: UTC+0 (GMT)

Bengassou (also spelled Bingassou) is a town in east-central Ivory Coast. It is a sub-prefecture of Bocanda Department in N'Zi Region, Lacs District.

Bengassou was a commune until March 2012, when it became one of 1,126 communes nationwide that were abolished.

In 2014, the population of the sub-prefecture of Bengassou was 22,891.

== Villages ==
The 24 villages of the sub-prefecture of Bengassou and their population in 2014 are:

1. Agbanan-Yakro (727)
2. Alloko-Kouakoukro (593)
3. Allokokro (224)
4. Assandeinkro (655)
5. Assika- N'ziblekro (1,848)
6. Assika-Ettienkro (1,047)
7. Assika-Kayabo (1,158)
8. Beboussou (957)
9. Bengassou (2,539)
10. Boni-Kouassikro (875)
11. Brou-Ahoussoukro (1,901)
12. Deblekro (488)
13. Djinandjikro (286)
14. Esse-Kokokro (1,162)
15. Esse-Yakro (602)
16. Essui-Koffikro (315)
17. Kongonouan (1,160)
18. Kouakou-Broukro (370)
19. N'gassokro (1,157)
20. Plioua (497)
21. Tchimoukro (2,659)
22. Tokpa-N'drikro (1,134)
23. Tokro (241)
24. Toumounou 1 (296)
