= Véronique Aka =

Ivorian politician

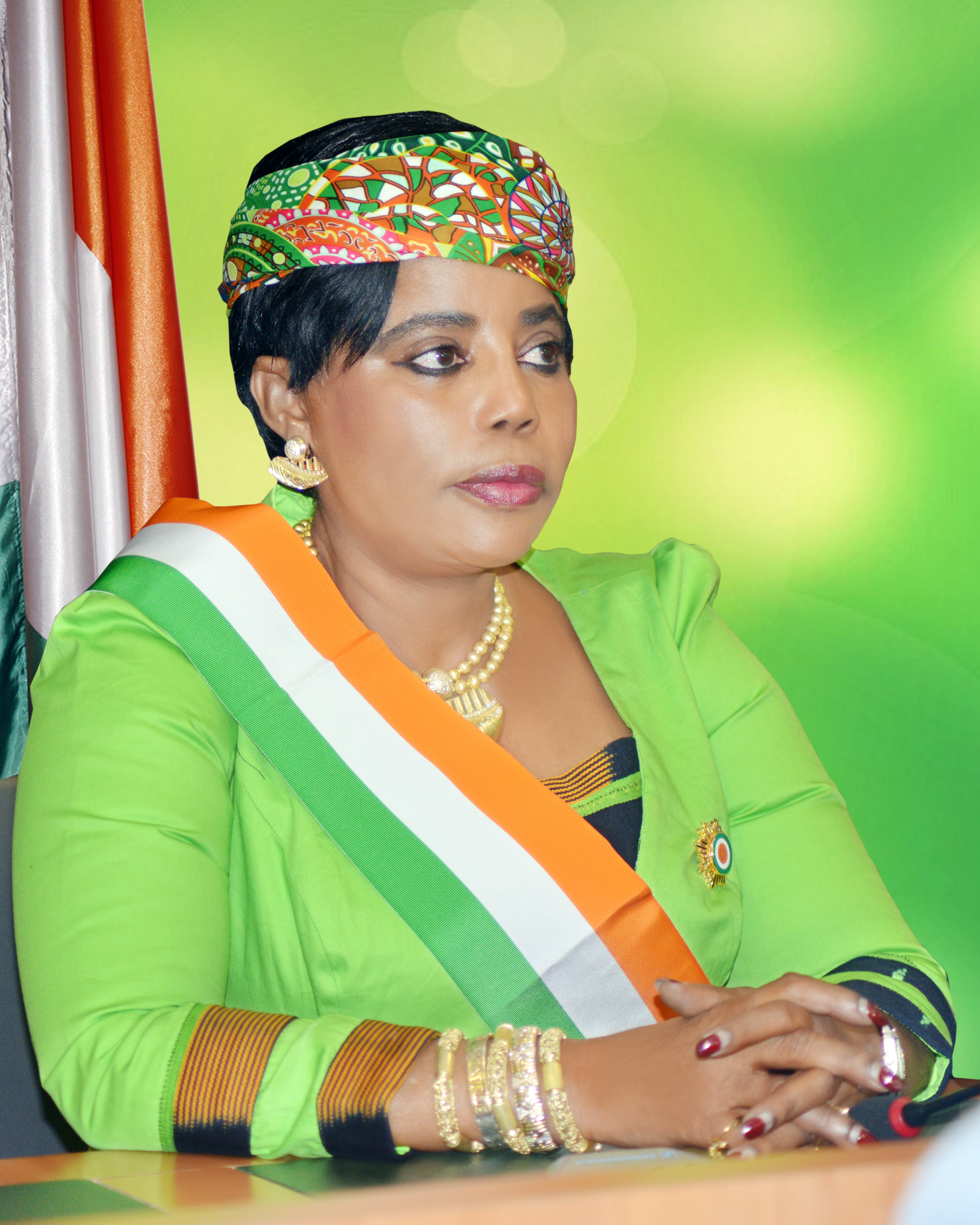

Vice-President of National Assembly
- Incumbent
- Assumed office 5 April 2017
- President: Alassane Ouattara (of Ivory Coast); Guillaume Soro (of assembly)
- Prime Minister: Amadou Gon Coulibaly (2017–)

President of the Regional Council of Moronou
- In office 29 June 2013 – 13 October 2018
- President: Alassane Ouattara
- Prime Minister: Daniel Kablan Duncan (2012–2017); Amadou Gon Coulibaly (2017–)
- Succeeded by: Pascal Affi N'Guessan

Personal details
- Born: 16 August 1959 (age 66) M'Batto, Ivory Coast
- Party: Democratic Party of Côte d'Ivoire – African Democratic Rally
- Spouse: Denis Bra Kanon (m. 2009; died 2009)

Véronique Bra Kanon (née Aka; born 16 August 1959) is an Ivorian politician and vice-president of the National Assembly of the Ivory Coast. She was the first woman to be president of an Ivorian regional council, leading the council of Moronou from 2013 to 2018.

== Biography ==
Véronique Aka was born on 16 August 1959, in M'Batto, Ivory Coast; she was one of three children adopted by Félix and Marie-Thérèse Houphouët-Boigny. She married former mayor of Daloa and Minister of Agriculture, Denis Bra Kanon at the Château d'Augerville in France on 15 April 2009. Kanon went into cardiac arrest and died on 10 June 2009.

== Career ==
In 2004, Aka set up a real estate company, Sotrapim (La Société de Travaux et de Promotion Immobilière). On 29 March 2006, she founded Mi-Moyé, a microfinance company designed to give loans to women in order for them to overcome poverty and allow them to fulfill their goals.

=== Political ===
Since 2006, Aka has been the president of the Réseau des Femmes africaines Ministres et Parlementaires de Côte d'Ivoire (REFAMPCI), a network of female African ministers and parliamentarians in the Ivory Coast. The group's goal is to unite women and fight female poverty.

In 2013, Aka ran as an independent and won in the regional elections for Moronou with 46.18% of the votes (20,459), beating out PDCI candidate, Ahoua N'Doli. Her win made her the first female to be elected president of an Ivorian regional council. Aka was instated as president at a ceremony on 29 June 2013.

On 15 June 2015, the PDCI-RDA elected Aka to be the president of the rural division of the Union des femmes de PDCI (UFPDCI).

On 5 April 2017, Guillaume Soro appointed Aka as one of eleven vice-presidents of the National Assembly of the Ivory Coast.

On 29 September 2018, Aka began her campaign for re-election in the 2018 regional elections for Moronou. She faced off against high-profile FPI candidate Pascal Affi N'Guessan. The Commission Electorale Indépendante (CEI) declared Affi the winner of the election on 13 October with – Aka disputed the results, claiming he sequestered and threatened the president of the CEI, stating that "a robbery took place".

== Election results ==
2013 Ivory Coast Regional Elections: Moronou
Party	Candidate	Votes	%
Independent	Véronique Aka	20,459	46.18
PDCI–RDA	Ahoua N'Doli	13,973	31.54
Independent	Assoumou Mea	6,349	14.33
Independent	Akpoue Brou Jean	3,518	7.94

2018 Ivory Coast Regional Elections: Moronou
Party	Candidate	Votes	%
FPI	Pascal Affi N'Guessan	26,027	43.15
PDCI–RDA	Véronique Aka	25,703	42.61
Independent	Siméon Ané Boni	7,601	12.60
