= Nofou =

- Town and sub-prefecture
- Location in Ivory Coast
- Coordinates: 6°50′N 4°42′W
- Country: Ivory Coast
- District: Lacs
- Region: N'Zi
- Department: Dimbokro

Population (2014)
  - Total: 6,633
- Time zone: UTC+0 (GMT)

Nofou is a town in south-central Ivory Coast. It is a sub-prefecture of Dimbokro Department in N'Zi Region, Lacs District.

Nofou was a commune until March 2012, when it became one of 1,126 communes nationwide that were abolished.

In 2014, the population of the sub-prefecture of Nofou was 6,633.

== Villages ==
The 15 villages of the sub-prefecture of Nofou and their population in 2014 are:

1. Adiakoun-Konankro (190)
2. Adjoumanikro (508)
3. Aman-Pokoukro (402)
4. Dani-Ahoussoukro (75)
5. Kayabo (296)
6. Konan-Tchimoukro (415)
7. Kouadio-Ettienkro (851)
8. Kouadio-Konankro (266)
9. Kouakou-Ebinikro (395)
10. Kprakro (813)
11. Langba (556)
12. Nofou (1,074)
13. N'zissiessou (263)
14. Pokou-Blakro (105)
15. Yassuikro (424)
