= Assié-Koumassi =

- Town and sub-prefecture
- Location in Ivory Coast
- Coordinates: 6°45′N 4°15′W
- Country: Ivory Coast
- District: Lacs
- Region: Moronou
- Department: Bongouanou

Population (2014)
  - Total: 15,542
- Time zone: UTC+0 (GMT)

Assié-Koumassi is a town in east-central Ivory Coast. It is a sub-prefecture of Bongouanou Department in Moronou Region, Lacs District.

Assié-Koumassi was a commune until March 2012, when it became one of the 1,126 communes nationwide that were abolished.

In 2014, the population of the sub-prefecture of Assié-Koumassi was 15,542.

== Villages ==
The six villages of the sub-prefecture of Assié-Koumassi and their population in 2014 are:

1. Assié-Assasso (2,465)
2. Assié-Kokoré (2,078)
3. Assié-Kouamékro (254)
4. Assié-Koumassi (8,375)
5. Assié-Koyékro (2,186)
6. Assié-Méakro (184)
