= Kotobi, Ivory Coast =

Kotobi
- Town and sub-prefecture
- Location in Ivory Coast
- Coordinates: 6°42′N 4°8′W
- Country: Ivory Coast
- District: Lacs
- Region: Moronou
- Department: Arrah

Population (2014)
  - Total: 25,674
- Time zone: UTC+0 (GMT)

Kotobi is a town in east-central Ivory Coast. It is a sub-prefecture of Arrah Department in Moronou Region, Lacs District.

Kotobi was a commune until March 2012, when it became one of 1,126 communes nationwide that were abolished.

In 2014, the population of the sub-prefecture of Kotobi was 25,674.

== Villages ==
The four villages of the sub-prefecture of Kotobi and their population in 2014 are:

1. Abongoua (10,408)
2. Kotobi (6,764)
3. N'zanfouénou (5,617)
4. Yaffo-Abongoua (2,885)
