= Kotobi =

Kotobi may refer to:

- Kotobi, Ivory Coast, a town in Arrah Department
- Kotobi, South Sudan, a village in Western Equatoria.
