= Aarah =

Aarah refers to several places in the Maldives:

- Aarah (Kaafu Atoll)
- Aarah (Raa Atoll)
- Aarah (Vaavu Atoll)

== See also ==
- Arrah, Bihar, India
- Arrah, Ivory Coast
