= Diangokro =

Djangokro Djangobo
- Town and sub-prefecture
- Location in Ivory Coast
- Coordinates: 6°46′N 4°35′W
- Country: Ivory Coast
- District: Lacs
- Region: N'Zi
- Department: Dimbokro

Population (2014)
  - Total: 10,451
- Time zone: UTC+0 (GMT)

Diangokro (also spelled Diangobo) is a town in south-central Ivory Coast. It is a sub-prefecture of Dimbokro Department in N'Zi Region, Lacs District.

Diangokro was a commune until March 2012, when it became one of 1,126 communes nationwide that were abolished.

In 2014, the population of the sub-prefecture of Diangokro was 10,451.

== Villages ==
The 16 villages of the sub-prefecture of Diangokro and their population in 2014 are:

1. Allougbéri-Kouadiokro (187)
2. Bangokro (1,212)
3. Bendékro (774)
4. Bocabo (978)
5. Boorée (841)
6. Booré-Akpokro (753)
7. Dadié-Kouassikro (443)
8. Diangokro (901)
9. Esse-Kouadiokro (243)
10. Koguinan (589)
11. Kouakou-Lékikro (694)
12. Kouassi-Niamienkro (150)
13. Koudianikro (457)
14. N'dayakro (1,197)
15. Tano-Akakro (659)
16. Totokro (373)
