= Krégbé =

- Town and sub-prefecture
- Location in Ivory Coast
- Coordinates: 6°58′N 4°0′W
- Country: Ivory Coast
- District: Lacs
- Region: Moronou
- Department: Arrah

Population (2014)
  - Total: 21,299
- Time zone: UTC+0 (GMT)

Krégbé is a town in east-central Ivory Coast. It is a sub-prefecture of Arrah Department in Moronou Region, Lacs District.

Krégbé was a commune until March 2012, when it became one of 1,126 communes nationwide that were abolished.

In 2014, the population of the sub-prefecture of Krégbé was 21,299.

== Villages ==
The six villages of the sub-prefecture of Krégbé and their population in 2014 are:

1. Assalé-Kouassikro (7,082)
2. Assouakro (2,465)
3. Erobo (3,830)
4. Gouabo (655)
5. Krégbé (6,278)
6. Midakro (989)
