= Anoumaba =

- Town, sub-prefecture, and commune
- Location in Ivory Coast
- Coordinates: 6°20′N 4°31′W
- Country: Ivory Coast
- District: Lacs
- Region: Moronou
- Department: M'Batto

Population (2014)
  - Total: 19,463
- Time zone: UTC+0 (GMT)

Anoumaba is a town in south-central Ivory Coast. It is a sub-prefecture and commune of M'Batto Department in Moronou Region, Lacs District. The border with Lagunes District is 10 kilometres south of the town.

In 2014, the population of the sub-prefecture of Anoumaba was 19,463.

== Villages ==
The 13 villages of the sub-prefecture of Anoumaba and their population in 2014 are:

1. Allakro (1,799)
2. Allongo (1,466)
3. Angbanou (1,802)
4. Anoumaba (5,881)
5. Appiakro (827)
6. Bettimbo (328)
7. Bocabo (862)
8. Damoikro (443)
9. Kongotty (1,390)
10. Koubébo (1,087)
11. N'drossou (485)
12. N'Gbribo (1,955)
13. Takikro (1,138)
