= Andé, Ivory Coast =

Andé
- Town and sub-prefecture
- Location in Ivory Coast
- Coordinates: 6°47′N 4°5′W
- Country: Ivory Coast
- District: Lacs
- Region: Moronou
- Department: Bongouanou

Population (2014)
  - Total: 51,726
- Time zone: UTC+0 (GMT)

Andé is a town in east-central Ivory Coast. It is a sub-prefecture of Bongouanou Department in Moronou Region, Lacs District.

Andé was a commune until March 2012, when it became one of 1,126 communes nationwide that were abolished.

In 2014, the population of the sub-prefecture of Andé was 51,726.

== Villages ==
The 11 villages of the sub-prefecture of Andé and their population in 2014 are:

1. Afféré 1 (1,595)
2. Afféré 2 (5,032)
3. Agbossou (5,777)
4. Agoua (3,380)
5. Andé (12,606)
6. Anékro (1,008)
7. Bénéné (3,593)
8. Brou-Akpaoussou (8,420)
9. Ellinzué (3,982)
10. Findimanou (4,007)
11. Yobouessou (2,326)
