= Assahara =

- Town and sub-prefecture
- Location in Ivory Coast
- Coordinates: 6°40′N 4°30′W
- Country: Ivory Coast
- District: Lacs
- Region: Moronou
- Department: M'Batto

Population (2014)
  - Total: 7,227
- Time zone: UTC+0 (GMT)

Assahara is a town in south-central Ivory Coast. It is a sub-prefecture of M'Batto Department in Moronou Region, Lacs District.

Assahara was a commune until March 2012, when it became one of 1,126 communes nationwide that were abolished.

In 2014, the population of the sub-prefecture of Assahara was 7,227.

== Villages ==
The seven villages of the sub-prefecture of Assahara and their population in 2014 are:

1. Adouakouakro (2,254)
2. Assahara (1,242)
3. Assiébosson Kouman (146)
4. Bouafoukro (1,099)
5. Komambo (324)
6. Kouakro (1,462)
7. N'drikro (700)
