= M'Batto =

M'Batto Mbato
- Town, sub-prefecture, and commune
- Location in Ivory Coast
- Coordinates: 6°28′N 4°22′W
- Country: Ivory Coast
- District: Lacs
- Region: Moronou
- Department: M'Batto

Area
  - Total: 981 km^{2} (379 sq mi)

Population (2021 census)
  - Total: 76,129
  - Density: 77.6/km^{2} (201/sq mi)
  - Town: 18,300
- (2014 census)
- Time zone: UTC+0 (GMT)

M'Batto (also spelled Mbato) is a town in south-central Ivory Coast. It is a sub-prefecture of and seat of M'Batto Department in Moronou Region, Lacs District. M'Batto is also a commune.

In 2021, the population of the sub-prefecture of M'Batto was 76,129.

== Villages ==
The 13 villages of the sub-prefecture of M'Batto and their population in 2014 are:

1. Ahounan (2 762)
2. Akpibo (815)
3. N'gramassabo (2 261)
4. Assié Akpessé (6 514)
5. Assoumoukro (4 820)
6. Diékadiokro (1 637)
7. M'batto (18 300)
8. Agnia (1 923)
9. Agoua (1 314)
10. Angamankro (795)
11. Assalekro (2 136)
12. Ehuikro (1 354)
13. Tiékou-Carrefour (6 376)
