= Bocanda =

- Town, sub-prefecture, and commune
- Location in Ivory Coast
- Coordinates: 7°4′N 4°30′W
- Country: Ivory Coast
- District: Lacs
- Region: N'Zi
- Department: Bocanda

Area
  - Total: 4,200 km^{2} (1,600 sq mi)

Population (2014)
  - Total: 60,183
- Time zone: UTC+0 (GMT)

Bocanda is a town in east-central Ivory Coast. It is a sub-prefecture of and seat of Bocanda Department in N'Zi Region, Lacs District. Bocanda is also a commune.

In 2014, the population of the sub-prefecture of Bocanda was 60,183.

== Villages ==
The 56 villages of the sub-prefecture of Bocanda and their population in 2014 are:

1. Abo-N'guessankro (380)
2. Abognikro (896)
3. Aerokro (700)
4. Ahali-Kolie-N'zikro (916)
5. Akossikro (1,482)
6. Amenankro (645)
7. Andianou (884)
8. Bocanda (10,684)
9. Bokakro (229)
10. Bombokro (1,625)
11. Daouakro (1,437)
12. Diakoubikro (212)
13. Diakpo (615)
14. Diango-Kokokro (871)
15. Dida-Kayabo (1,607)
16. Dida-Moessou (1,731)
17. Djenzoukro (1,748)
18. Fondi 1 (264)
19. Fondi 2 (129)
20. Gbanan-Koffikro (645)
21. Gbonou (2,188)
22. Gbonou-Carrefour (769)
23. Goli (440)
24. Golikro (625)
25. Golikro N'zinouan (505)
26. Kando-Koffikro (437)
27. Kanoukro (738)
28. Katchiré-Essékro (1,882)
29. Koffi-Kouadiokro (810)
30. Kokoboukro (237)
31. Koliakro (911)
32. Konan-Lekikro (674)
33. Konan-N'drikro (1],461)
34. Kotokounou (285)
35. Kouadianikro (547)
36. Koubikro (455)
37. Koumokro (1,190)
38. Kromikro (655)
39. M'beri (621)
40. N'da-Broukro (1,176)
41. N'do-Kouassikro (850)
42. N'doli-Yebouekro (455)
43. N'gatta - Yebouekro (1,201)
44. N'gatta-Kokokro (1,122)
45. N'gouanlate (805)
46. Nangokro (1,806)
47. Sale-Balekro (1,648)
48. Soh-N'guessankro (722)
49. Sokokro (1,404)
50. Souamekro (786)
51. Soungra-Katienou (409)
52. Soussouyakro (998)
53. Tagnakro (1,211)
54. Tekikro (930)
55. Toumounou 2 (270)
56. Ya Kouassikro (1,260)

== Economy ==
Though Bocanda cultivated coffee and cocoa, agriculture in the region is currently considered underdeveloped, which has implications for local economic growth.

== Landmarks ==
The town has a small regional medical center, a mayor's office, an active marketplace, a petrol station, a high school, five primary schools, a Catholic church, several Protestant churches, and a mosque.

== Demographics ==
The traditional residents are of the Baoulé tribe, though there is a large Dyula population.

== Notable people ==
- André Silver Konan, journalist and writer
- Dodo Akissi Madeleine, politician
- Yves Marie Koissi, politician, head of the administrative council of Bocanda
