= Arrah, Ivory Coast =

Arrah
- Town, sub-prefecture, and commune
- Location in Ivory Coast
- Coordinates: 6°40′N 3°58′W
- Country: Ivory Coast
- District: Lacs
- Region: Moronou
- Department: Arrah

Area
  - Total: 705 km^{2} (272 sq mi)

Population (2021 census)
  - Total: 45,625
  - Density: 64.7/km^{2} (168/sq mi)
  - Town: 24,122
- (2014 census)
- Time zone: UTC+0 (GMT)

Arrah is a town in east-central Ivory Coast. It is a sub-prefecture of and the seat of Arrah Department in Moronou Region, Lacs District. Arrah is also a commune.

The tripoint of the districts of Lacs, Lagunes, and Comoé lies 20 kilometres east of the town.

In 2021, the population of the sub-prefecture of Arrah was 45,625.

== Villages ==
The 8 villages of the sub-prefecture of Arrah and their population in 2014 are:

1. Arrah (24 123)
2. Assikro (977)
3. Brou-Attakro (3 451)
4. Dallosso (1 175)
5. Etilékro (614)
6. Kouadiokro (1 221)
7. M'brakro (479)
8. Yaffo-Agni (1 332)
