= Nzi River Bridge collapse =

2016 bridge collapse in Ivory Coast

Coordinates: 06°38′13″N 04°42′22″W

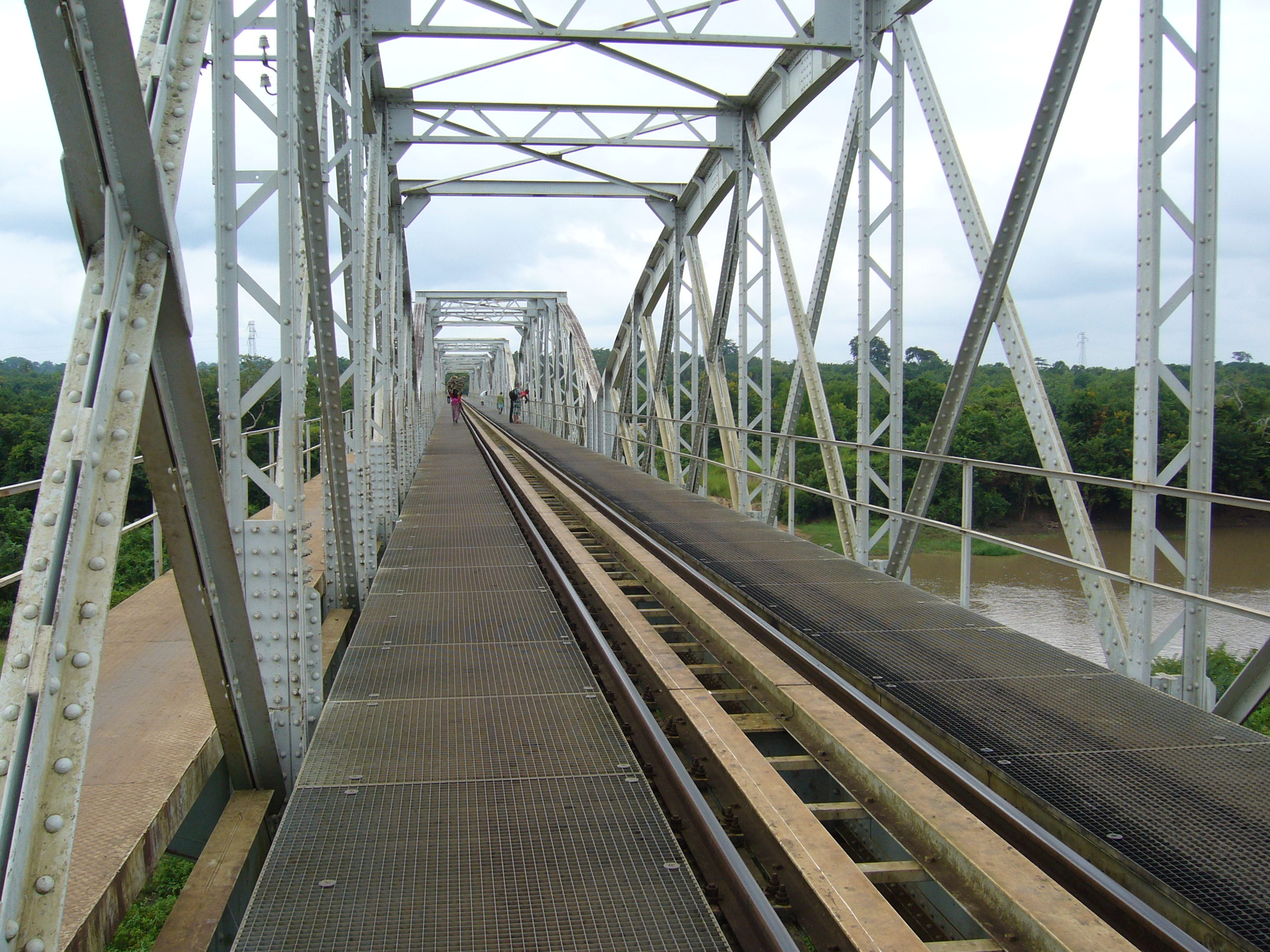
Dimbokro railway bridge, photographed in 2008

On 6 September 2016, the railway bridge over the Nzi River collapsed, cutting the rail link between Ivory Coast and Burkina Faso. Partial services on the line resumed on 10 September, with repairs estimated to take about two weeks.

== Background ==
The Nzi River Bridge is a 250-metre (820 ft) steel railway bridge over the Nzi River near Dimbokro in Ivory Coast, built in 1910. It carries the single-track railway between Abidjan and Ouagadougou and also a foot bridge, and consists of a single span crossing the river flanked by smaller spans crossing the floodplain. According to local residents, it was rusty and in a poor state of repair. The rail link is operated by Sitarail.

== Collapse ==
On 6 September 2016, one of the approach spans collapsed while a two-engined goods train was attempting to leave the bridge in the direction of Burkina Faso. The train consisted of 20 or 21 wagons with a load of more than 1000 tons, which remained on the bridge. The accident cut the rail link between the two countries, which is important to their economies. While most reports say that no-one was injured, one report says that the two train drivers were injured.

The two engines are numbered CC 22105 and CC 22008. They are class GT22LC-2 from GMD and have a Co-Co wheel arrangement with 6 axles (12 wheels).

In addition to interrupting railway traffic, the accident destroyed the pedestrian connection for local residents, who started to use small boats to ferry goods and people across the river.

One local source suggested that the bridge had been destabilised when the arm of a bulldozer hit it, and that this may have caused the accident.

== Repairs ==
Repairs were expected to cost £400 million and take two weeks to complete.

By 14 September, the two locomotives had been lifted by heavy-duty cranes onto a road trailer. Temporary fill was put in place, armoured with gabions, and the damaged span removed.

Partial services on the line resumed on 10 September, with container goods being transported by a combination of rail and lorry.

== See also ==
- List of bridge failures
