= Dimbokro Airport =

Airport in Ivory Coast

- IATA: DIM; ICAO: DIDK

Summary
- Airport type: Public
- Serves: Dimbokro
- Elevation AMSL: 344 ft / 105 m
- Coordinates: 6°39′6″N 4°38′26″W

Map

Runways
Direction	Length		Surface
Direction	ft	m	Surface
17/35	5,900	1,800	Unpaved
- Source: Google Maps

Dimbokro Airport (IATA: DIM, ICAO: DIDK) is an airport serving Dimbokro, Côte d'Ivoire.

== See also ==
- Transport in Côte d'Ivoire
