= Nzi River =

Watercourse in the Ivory Coast

Coordinates: 5°57′03″N 4°49′57″W

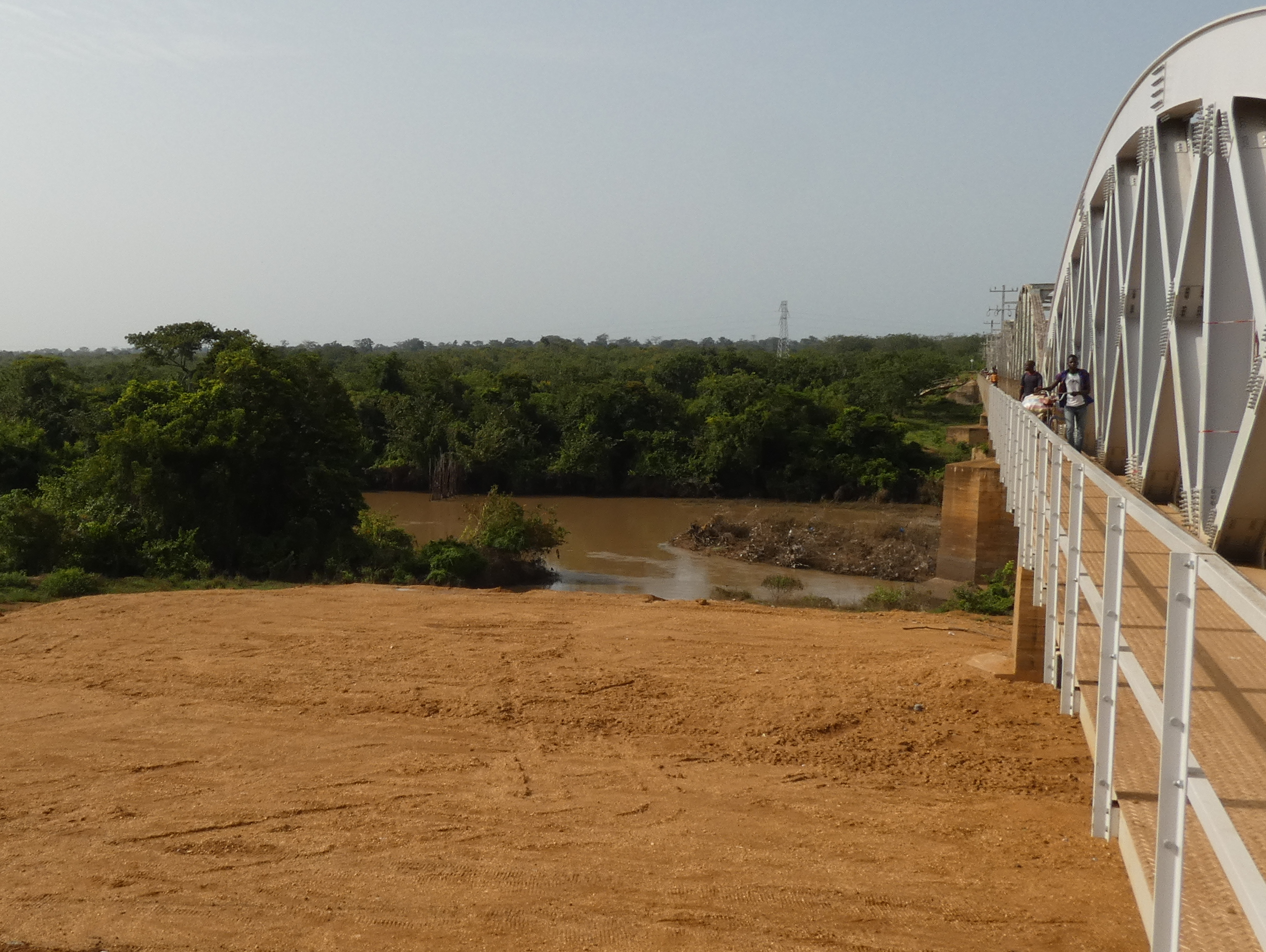
The N'Zi near Dimbokro

The Nzi River or N'zi River is a river in Ivory Coast. It is a tributary of the Bandama River.

On 6 September 2016, the railway bridge over this river near Dimbokro collapsed.
