= N'Guessankro, Lacs =

N'Guessankro
- Town and sub-prefecture
- Location in Ivory Coast
- Coordinates: 6°40′N 4°16′W
- Country: Ivory Coast
- District: Lacs
- Region: Moronou
- Department: Bongouanou

Population (2014)
  - Total: 35,048
- Time zone: UTC+0 (GMT)

N'Guessankro is a town in east-central Ivory Coast. It is a sub-prefecture of Bongouanou Department in Moronou Region, Lacs District.

N'Guessankro was a commune until March 2012, when it became one of 1,126 communes nationwide that were abolished.

In 2014, the population of the sub-prefecture of N'Guessankro was 35,048.

== Villages ==
The 13 villages of the sub-prefecture of N'Guessankro and their population in 2014 are:

1. Agnialiessou (1,390)
2. Ahounienfoutou (2,596)
3. Akobakabo (1,129)
4. Allangbakro (4,699)
5. Bouadikro (1,846)
6. Essuikro (974)
7. Fronobo (2,569)
8. Kinimokro (3,067)
9. M'baoucessou (4,587)
10. N'dolikro (2,305)
11. N'guessankro (4,721)
12. Niandian (1,525)
13. N'zuékokoré (3,640)
