= Bonab, Darab =

Bonab بناب
- Village
- Location within Iran
- Coordinates: 28°29′38″N 55°16′31″E
- Country: Iran
- Province: Fars
- County: Darab
- Bakhsh: Rostaq
- Rural District: Kuhestan

Population (2006)
  - Total: 29
- Time zone: UTC+3:30 (IRST)
  - Summer (DST): UTC+4:30 (IRDT)

Bonab (Persian: بناب, also Romanized as Bonāb) is a village in Kuhestan Rural District, Rostaq District, Darab County, Fars province, Iran. At the 2006 census, its population was 29, in 8 families.
