= Bonab, Hormozgan =

Bonab بناب
- Village
- Location within Iran
- Coordinates: 27°29′21″N 55°24′28″E
- Country: Iran
- Province: Hormozgan
- County: Hajjiabad
- Bakhsh: Fareghan
- Rural District: Ashkara

Population (2006)
  - Total: 214
- Time zone: UTC+3:30 (IRST)
  - Summer (DST): UTC+4:30 (IRDT)

Bonab (Persian: بناب, also Romanized as Bonāb and Benāb) is a village in Ashkara Rural District, Fareghan District, Hajjiabad County, Hormozgan Province, Iran. At the 2006 census, its population was 214, in 52 families.
