= Seydou Diarra =

Ivorian political figure (1933–2020)

Seydou Elimane Diarra
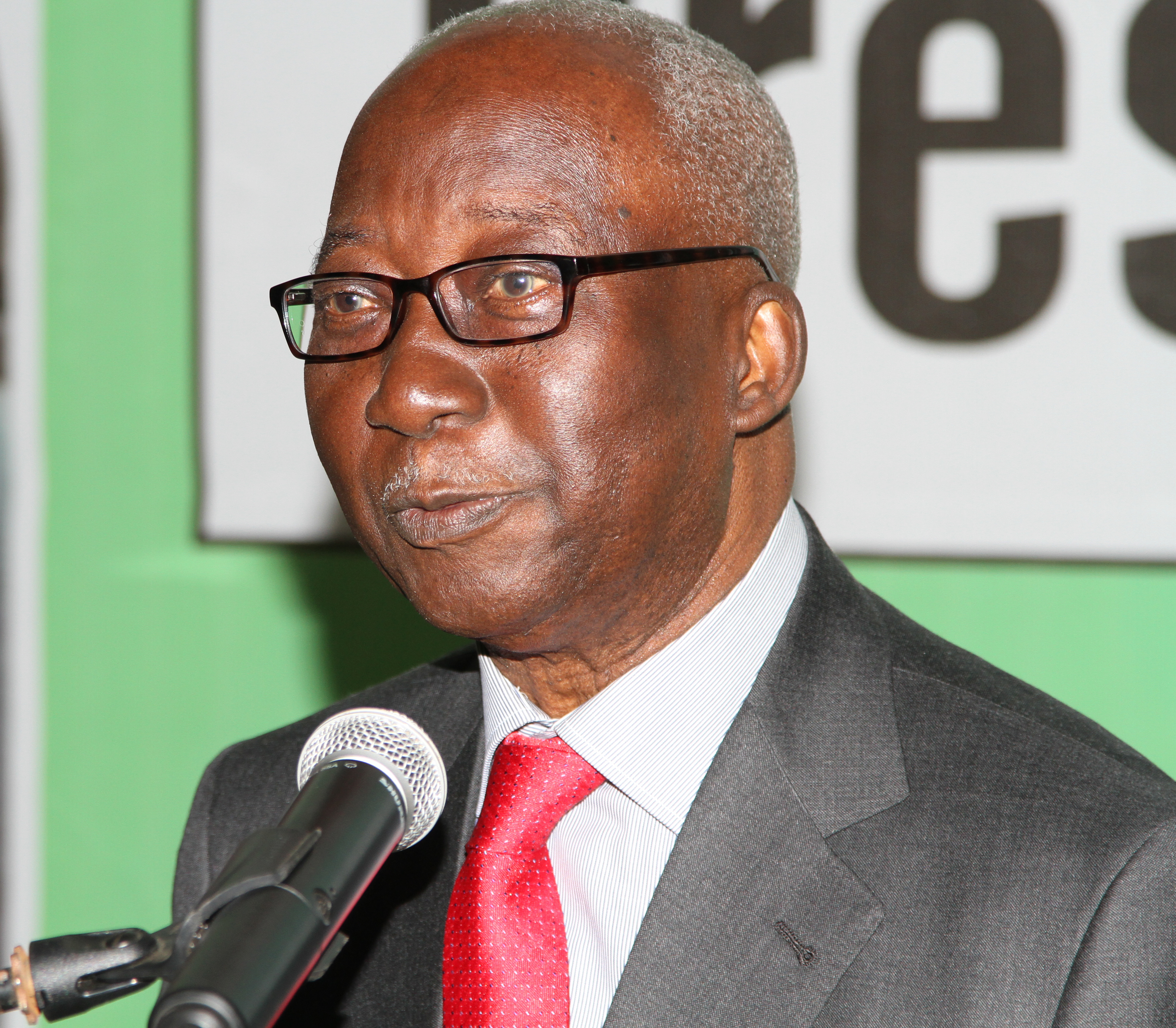

4th Prime Minister of Ivory Coast
- In office 18 May 2000 – 18 October 2000
- President: Robert Guéï
- Preceded by: Daniel Kablan Duncan
- Succeeded by: Pascal Affi N'Guessan
- In office 10 February 2003 – 7 December 2005
- President: Laurent Gbagbo
- Preceded by: Pascal Affi N'Guessan
- Succeeded by: Charles Konan Banny

Personal details
- Born: 23 November 1933 Katiola, French West Africa
- Died: 19 July 2020 (aged 86) Abidjan, Côte d'Ivoire
- Profession: Diplomat

Seydou Elimane Diarra (23 November 1933 – 19 July 2020) was an Ivorian politician, who served as the Prime Minister in 2000 and again from 2003 to 2005.

== Life and career ==
Diarra was born on 23 November 1933 in Katiola. Prior to joining the government, he was an Ambassador to the European Economic Community and Brazil and was President of the Chamber of Commerce and Industry of Ivory Coast. After the December 1999 military coup, he was appointed Minister of State for Planning, Development, and Government Cooperation on 4 January 2000, under transitional President Robert Guéï. He was subsequently Prime Minister from May 2000 to October 2000.

He was again appointed Prime Minister in February 2003 as part of a deal to end the 2002-2003 civil war, due to his position as a neutral figure at the time; however, many supporters of President Laurent Gbagbo accused him of not taking a strong stance against the rebels, despite their failure to disarm in October 2004, and demanded his resignation.

On 5 December 2005, African Union mediators announced that Diarra was to be replaced by Charles Konan Banny, effective on 7 December.

=== Education ===
Seydou Diarra was originally from the north of Côte d'Ivoire and a Muslim. A scholarship holder from the French Republic, he studied in La Rochelle and then obtained a diploma in agricultural engineering from the École nationale supérieure agronomique de Montpellier.

== Death ==
Diarra died in Abidjan on 19 July 2020, at the age of 86.

Preceded by Daniel Kablan Duncan	Prime Minister of Ivory Coast; 2000	Succeeded by Pascal Affi N'Guessan
Preceded by Pascal Affi N'Guessan	Prime Minister of Ivory Coast; 2003–2005	Succeeded by Charles Konan Banny
