= Arrah Department =

Coordinates: 6°40′N 3°58′W

Arrah Department Département d'Arrah
- Department
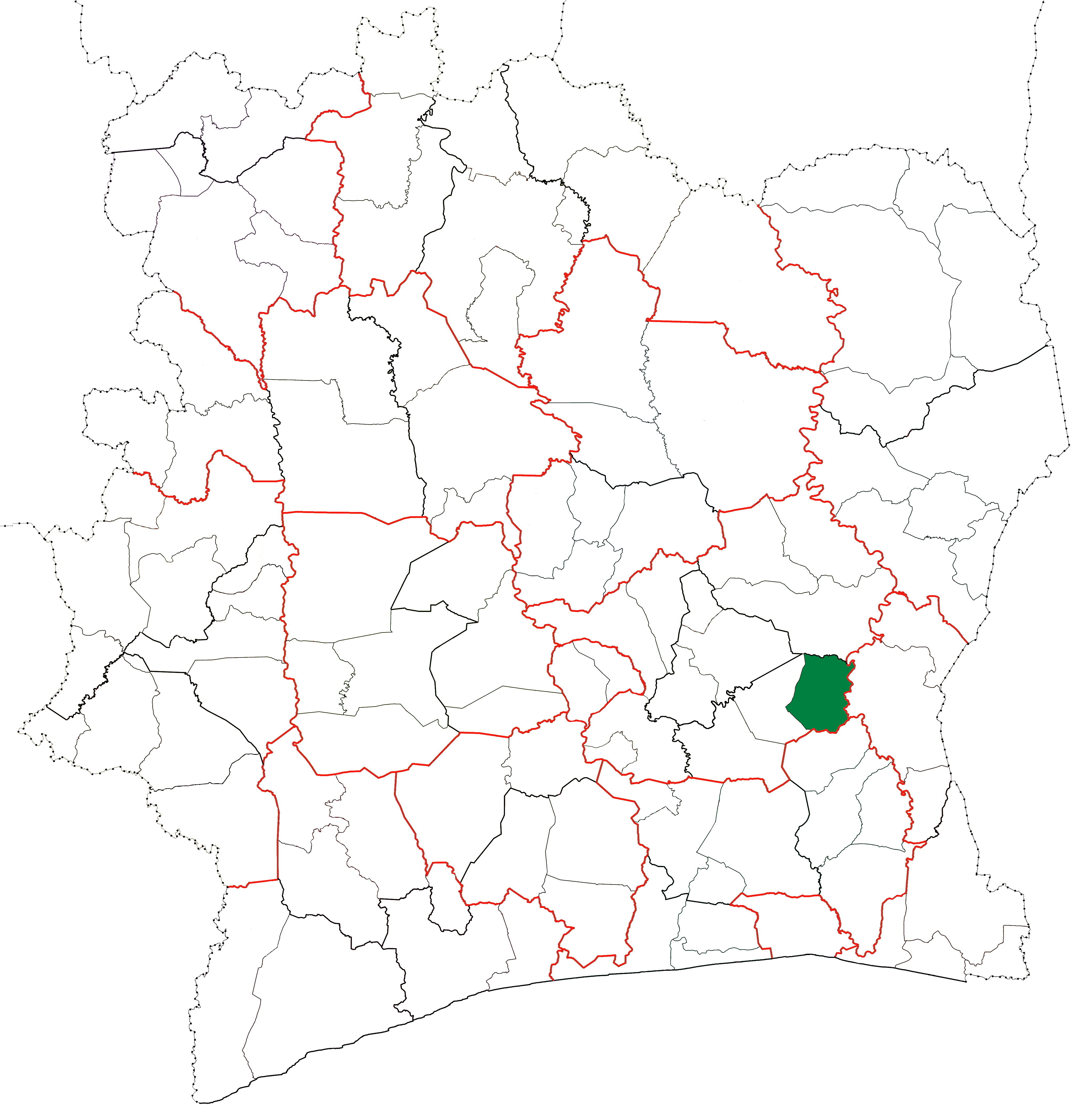
- Location in Ivory Coast. Arrah Department has retained the same boundaries since its creation in 2009.
- Country: Ivory Coast
- District: Lacs
- Region: Moronou
- 2009: Established as a second-level subdivision via a division of Bongouanou Dept
- 2011: Converted to a third-level subdivision
- 2012: Transferred from N'Zi Region to new Moronou Region
- Departmental seat: Arrah

Government
  - Prefect: Georges Gonbagui Gueu

Area
  - Total: 1,540 km^{2} (590 sq mi)

Population (2021 census)
  - Total: 103,846
  - Density: 67.4/km^{2} (175/sq mi)
- Time zone: UTC+0 (GMT)

Arrah Department is a department of Moronou Region in Lacs District, Ivory Coast. In 2017, Its seat is in the settlement of Arrah. The sub-prefectures of the department are Arrah, Kotobi, and Krégbé.

== History ==
Arrah Department was created in 2009 as a second-level division via a split-off from Bongouanou Department. At its creation, it was part of N'Zi-Comoé Region.

In 2011, districts were introduced as new first-level subdivisions of Ivory Coast. At the same time, regions were reorganised and became second-level subdivisions and all departments were converted into third-level subdivisions. At this time, Arrah Department became part of N'Zi Region in Lacs District. In 2012, it was joined with two other departments to form the new Moronou Region.
