= Charles Konan Banny =

Ivorian politician (1942–2021)

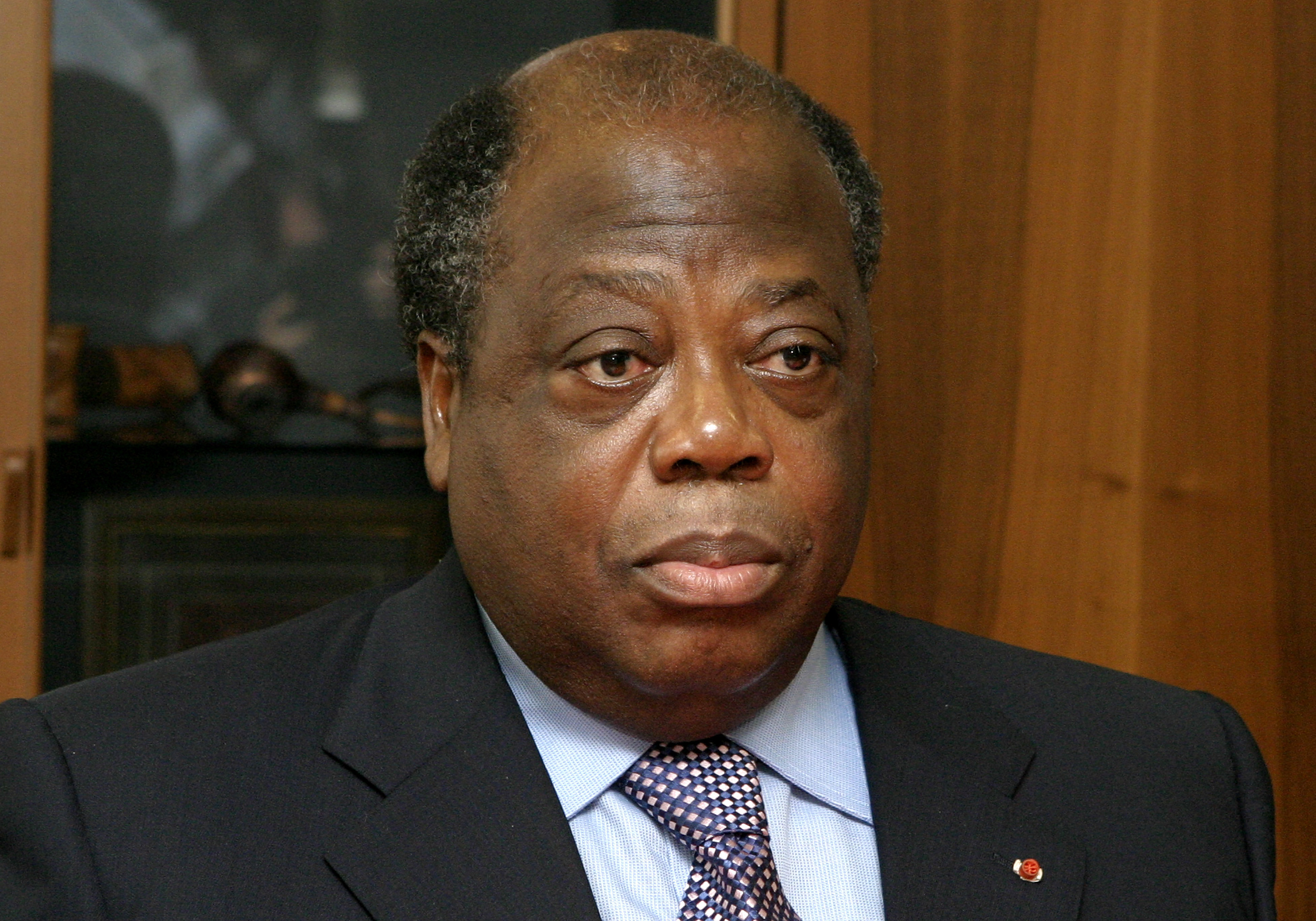
- Banny in 2006

6th Prime Minister of Côte d'Ivoire
- In office 7 December 2005 – 7 April 2007
- Preceded by: Seydou Diarra
- Succeeded by: Guillaume Soro

Governor of the Central Bank of West African States
- In office 1990–2005
- Preceded by: Alassane Ouattara
- Succeeded by: Justin Damo Baro

Personal details
- Born: 11 November 1942 Divo, Ivory Coast, French West Africa, France
- Died: 10 September 2021 (aged 78) Neuilly-sur-Seine, France
- Profession: economist

Charles Konan Banny (11 November 1942 – 10 September 2021) was an Ivorian politician, who served as prime minister from 7 December 2005 until 4 April 2007.

== Life and career ==
Banny joined the Central Bank of West African States (BCEAO) in 1976, holding various positions in the Bank over the years. In 1988 he became Special Advisor to the Governor of BCEAO. After BCEAO Governor Alassane Ouattara became Prime Minister of Côte d'Ivoire, Banny was appointed Interim Governor on 4 December 1990. On 22 December 1993, he was appointed Governor, formally taking the position on 1 January 1994. He was reappointed for another six-year term as Governor on 17 June 1999, with the term beginning on 1 January 2000.

Banny's selection to replace Seydou Diarra as transitional Prime Minister of Côte d'Ivoire was announced on 5 December 2005. His term was expected to end in October 2006, when national elections were to be held; however, elections were not held by the deadline, and the term of President Laurent Gbagbo was extended for another year, with Banny's powers increased during that period.

Because of his selection as prime minister, Banny was barred from running for the office of President of Côte d'Ivoire. Following a peace deal in March 2007, New Forces leader Guillaume Soro was appointed prime minister at the end of the month, and he took over from Banny on 4 April.

Banny also held the position of Minister of Economy and Finance from December 2005 to April 2007.

In September 2021, Banny was evacuated to Europe for health reasons.

On 10 September 2021, Banny died from COVID-19, during the COVID-19 pandemic in France, following his evacuation from the Ivory Coast. He was 78.

Preceded by Seydou Diarra	Prime Minister of Côte d'Ivoire; 2005–2007	Succeeded by Guillaume Soro
