= Bongouanou =

- Town, sub-prefecture, and commune
- Location in Ivory Coast
- Coordinates: 6°39′N 4°12′W
- Country: Ivory Coast
- District: Lacs
- Region: Moronou
- Department: Bongouanou

Area
  - Total: 585 km^{2} (226 sq mi)

Population (2021)
  - Total: 74,281
  - Density: 127/km^{2} (329/sq mi)
  - Town: 28,064
- (2014 census)
- Time zone: UTC+0 (GMT)

Bongouanou is the town in east-central Ivory Coast. It is a sub-prefecture of and the seat of Bongouanou Department. It is also the seat of Moronou Region in Lacs District and a commune.

In 2021, the population of the sub-prefecture of Bongouanou was 74,281.

== Villages ==
The 13 villages of the sub-prefecture of Bongouanou and their population in 2014 are:

1. Ahorosso (1 914)
2. Akakro (1 360)
3. Amonkro (487)
4. Assaouffoué (5 882)
5. Banabo (3 175)
6. Bocassi (2 518)
7. Bongouanou (28 064)
8. Broukro (6 908)
9. Ehuikro (774)
10. Kayabo (353)
11. Nanan Assouakro (364)
12. N'guinou (8 076)
13. Tanosso (3 116)
