= Dimbokro =

- Town, sub-prefecture, and commune
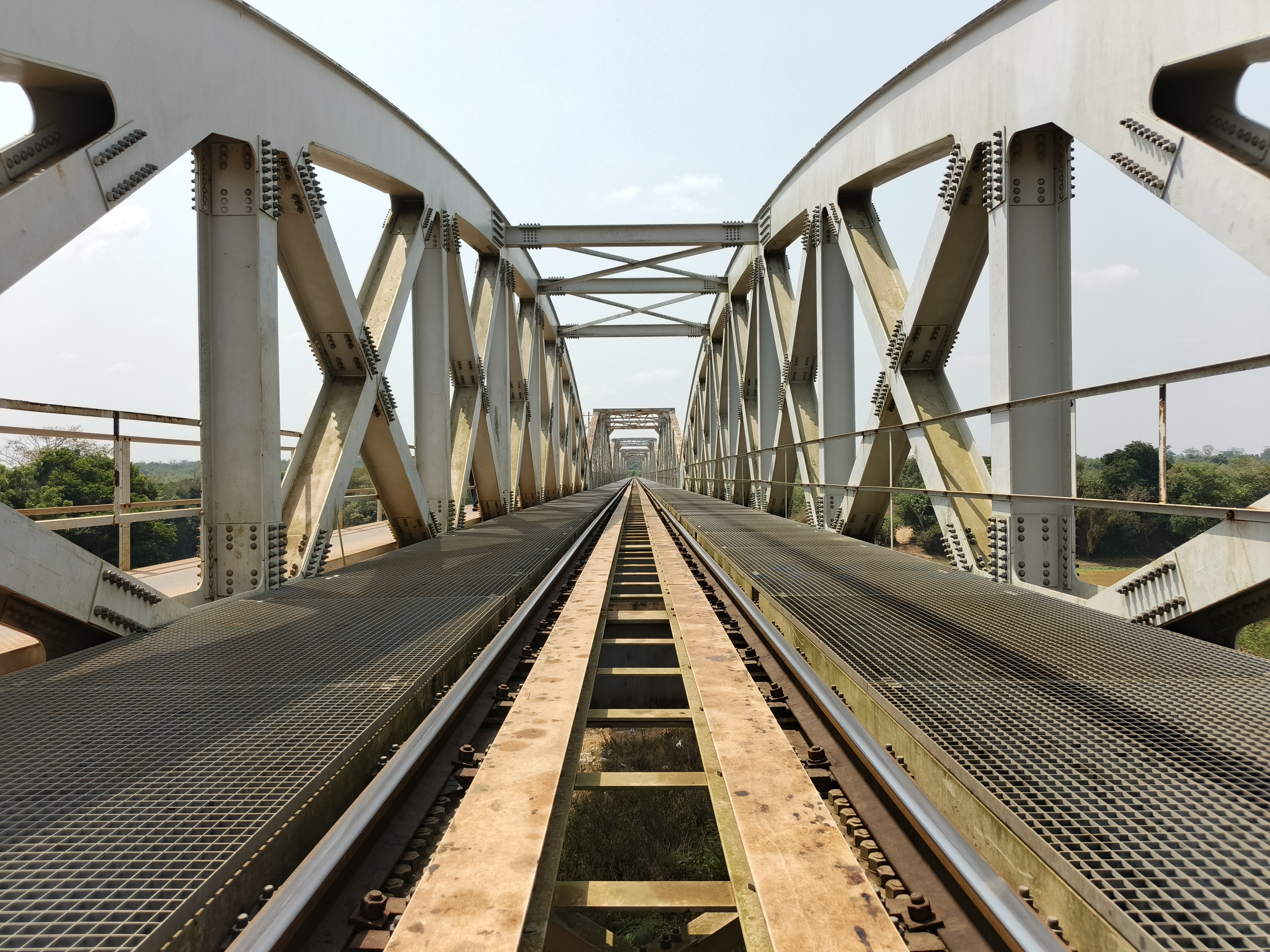
- Railway bridge at Dimbokro

- Location in Ivory Coast
- Coordinates: 6°39′N 4°42′W
- Country: Ivory Coast
- District: Lacs
- Region: N'Zi
- Department: Dimbokro

Area
  - Total: 168 sq mi (436 km^{2})

Population (2021 census)
  - Total: 70,198
  - Density: 417/sq mi (161/km^{2})
  - Town: 48,860
- (2014 census)
- Time zone: UTC+0 (GMT)

Dimbokro is a town in south-central Ivory Coast. It is the seat of both Lacs District and N'Zi Region. It is also the seat of and a sub-prefecture of Dimbokro Department. Dimbokro is also a commune.

The town is located along the river N'Zi, approximately 50 km southeast of the official capital of Ivory Coast, Yamoussoukro. Dimbokro is connected by both road and railway from the country's commercial capital and de facto political capital Abidjan on the coast. Except for a textile factory, the town is of limited size and economic importance. Dimbokro is otherwise known as the birthplace of the country's current president, Alassane Ouattara and African reggae superstar Alpha Blondy.

== Climate ==
Climate data for Dimbokro
Month	Jan	Feb	Mar	Apr	May	Jun	Jul	Aug	Sep	Oct	Nov	Dec	Year
Mean daily maximum °C (°F)	33.9 (93.0)	35.5 (95.9)	35.0 (95.0)	34.4 (93.9)	33.5 (92.3)	31.7 (89.1)	30.2 (86.4)	29.9 (85.8)	30.9 (87.6)	31.8 (89.2)	32.7 (90.9)	32.2 (90.0)	32.6 (90.7)
Daily mean °C (°F)	27.2 (81.0)	29.1 (84.4)	29.1 (84.4)	28.9 (84.0)	28.2 (82.8)	27.0 (80.6)	25.9 (78.6)	25.7 (78.3)	26.6 (79.9)	27.2 (81.0)	27.6 (81.7)	26.9 (80.4)	27.4 (81.3)
Mean daily minimum °C (°F)	20.3 (68.5)	22.6 (72.7)	23.2 (73.8)	23.3 (73.9)	23.0 (73.4)	22.5 (72.5)	22.0 (71.6)	21.9 (71.4)	22.0 (71.6)	22.3 (72.1)	22.2 (72.0)	20.9 (69.6)	22.2 (72.0)
Average precipitation mm (inches)	11.9 (0.47)	48.0 (1.89)	11.9 (0.47)	139.4 (5.49)	161.0 (6.34)	205.6 (8.09)	112.4 (4.43)	74.8 (2.94)	125.5 (4.94)	119.9 (4.72)	60.4 (2.38)	22.6 (0.89)	1,093.4 (43.05)
Mean monthly sunshine hours	203.5	178.1	203.5	216.5	214.7	164.3	118.2	93.9	121.7	189.0	203.0	183.5	2,089.9
Source: NOAA

== Transport ==
Dimbokro is served by Dimbokro Airport and by a station on the national railway system.

A railway bridge over the Nzi River near Dimbokro collapsed on 6 September 2016.

In 2014, the population of the sub-prefecture of Dimbokro was 64,957.

== Villages ==
The 24 villages of the sub-prefecture of Dimbokro and their population in 2014 are:

1. Ahouniassou (596)
2. Ahua (2,218)
3. Akessemossou (401)
4. Alloko-Kouakoukro (78)
5. Andianou (300)
6. Bassa-Yobouébo (541)
7. Dimbokro (48,860)
8. Ebimolossou (2,022)
9. Faiteassou (201)
10. Kadjabo (488)
11. Kangrassou-Eluibo (945)
12. Kangrassou-M'brizuénouan (104)
13. Kangrassou-Yobouébo (230)
14. Koffi-Ahoussouko (418)
15. Koffi-Kouadiokro (36)
16. Kolibo (268)
17. Krokokro (560)
18. Niamassou (544)
19. Sokro (92)
20. Soungassi (573)
21. Soungassou (1,833)
22. Tangoumanssou (1,486)
23. Troumabo (1,486)
24. Wawérénou (677)
