= Dimbokro Department =

Coordinates: 6°39′N 4°42′W

Dimbokro Department Département de Dimbokro
- Department
- Location in Ivory Coast. Dimbokro Department has had these boundaries since 1998.
- Country: Ivory Coast
- District: Lacs
- Region: N'Zi
- 1969: Established as a first-level subdivision
- 1980: Divided to create Bongouanou Dept
- 1988: Divided to create Daoukro Dept
- 1997: Converted to a second-level subdivision
- 1998: Divided to create Bocanda Dept
- 2011: Converted to a third-level subdivision
- Departmental seat: Dimbokro

Government
  - Prefect: Jacques N'Guessan Obouo

Area
  - Total: 1,480 km^{2} (570 sq mi)

Population (2021 census)
  - Total: 102,192
  - Density: 69.0/km^{2} (179/sq mi)
- Time zone: UTC+0 (GMT)

Dimbokro Department is a department of N'Zi Region in Lacs District, Ivory Coast. In 2021, its population was 102,192 and its seat is the settlement of Dimbokro. The sub-prefectures of the department are Abigui, Diangokro, Dimbokro, and Nofou.

== History ==
Dimbokro Department was created in 1969 as one of the 24 new departments that were created to take the place of the six departments that were being abolished. It was created from territory that was formerly part of Centre Department. Using current boundaries as a reference, from 1969 to 1980 the department encompassed the following territory: all of Moronou Region; all of N'Zi Region; and Daoukro and Ouellé Departments in Iffou Region.

In 1980, Dimbokro Department was divided to create Bongouanou Department. What remained was divided again in 1988 to create Daoukro Department. In 1997, regions were introduced as new first-level subdivisions of Ivory Coast; as a result, all departments were converted into second-level subdivisions. Dimbokro Department was included in N'Zi-Comoé Region. In 1998, the department was divided again to create Bocanda Department.

In 2011, districts were introduced as new first-level subdivisions of Ivory Coast. At the same time, regions were reorganised and became second-level subdivisions and all departments were converted into third-level subdivisions. At this time, Dimbokro Department became part of N'Zi Region in Lacs District.

=== Maps of historical boundaries ===
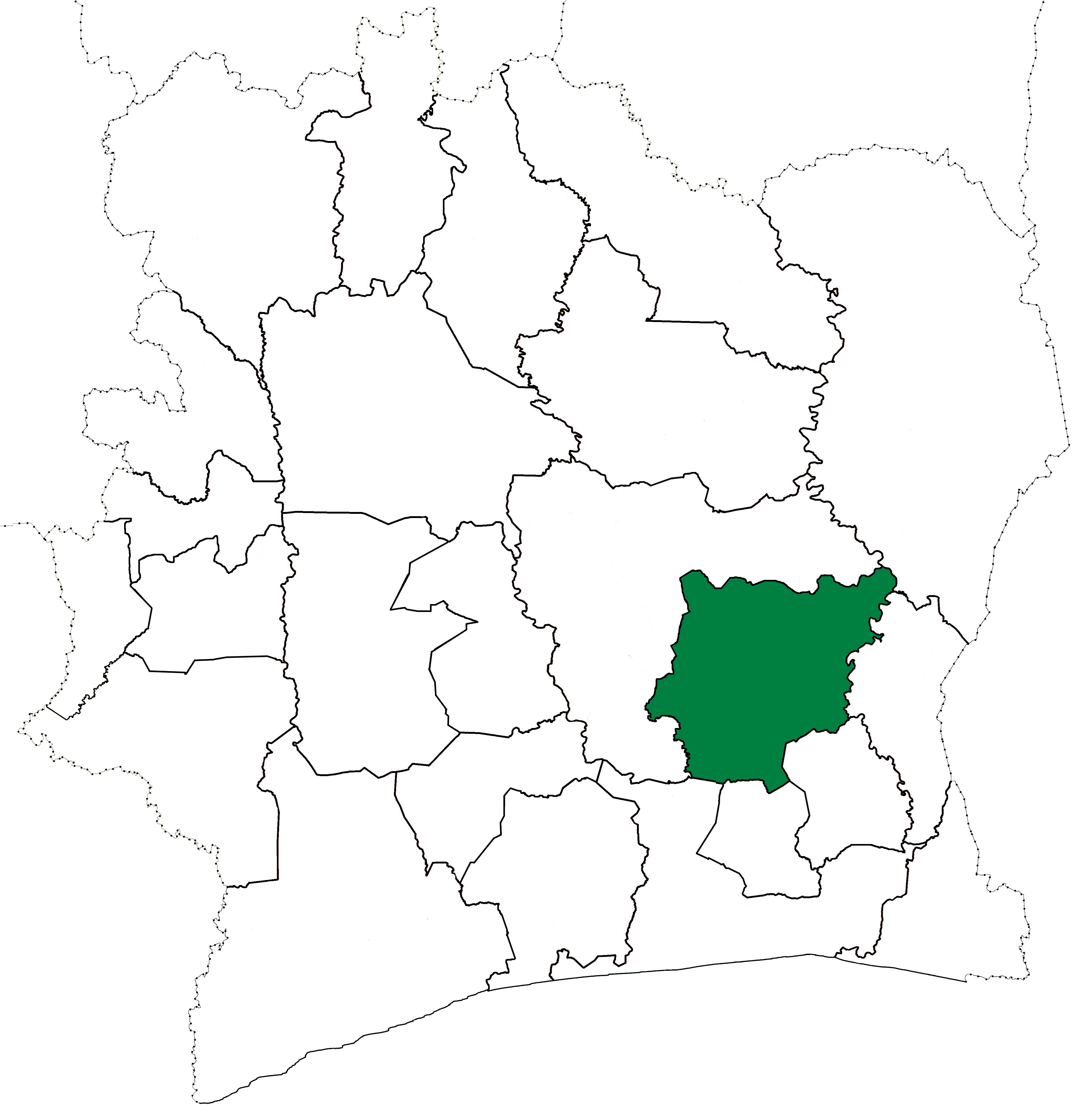
Dimbokro Department upon its creation in 1969. It kept these boundaries until 1980, but other departments began to be divided in 1974.

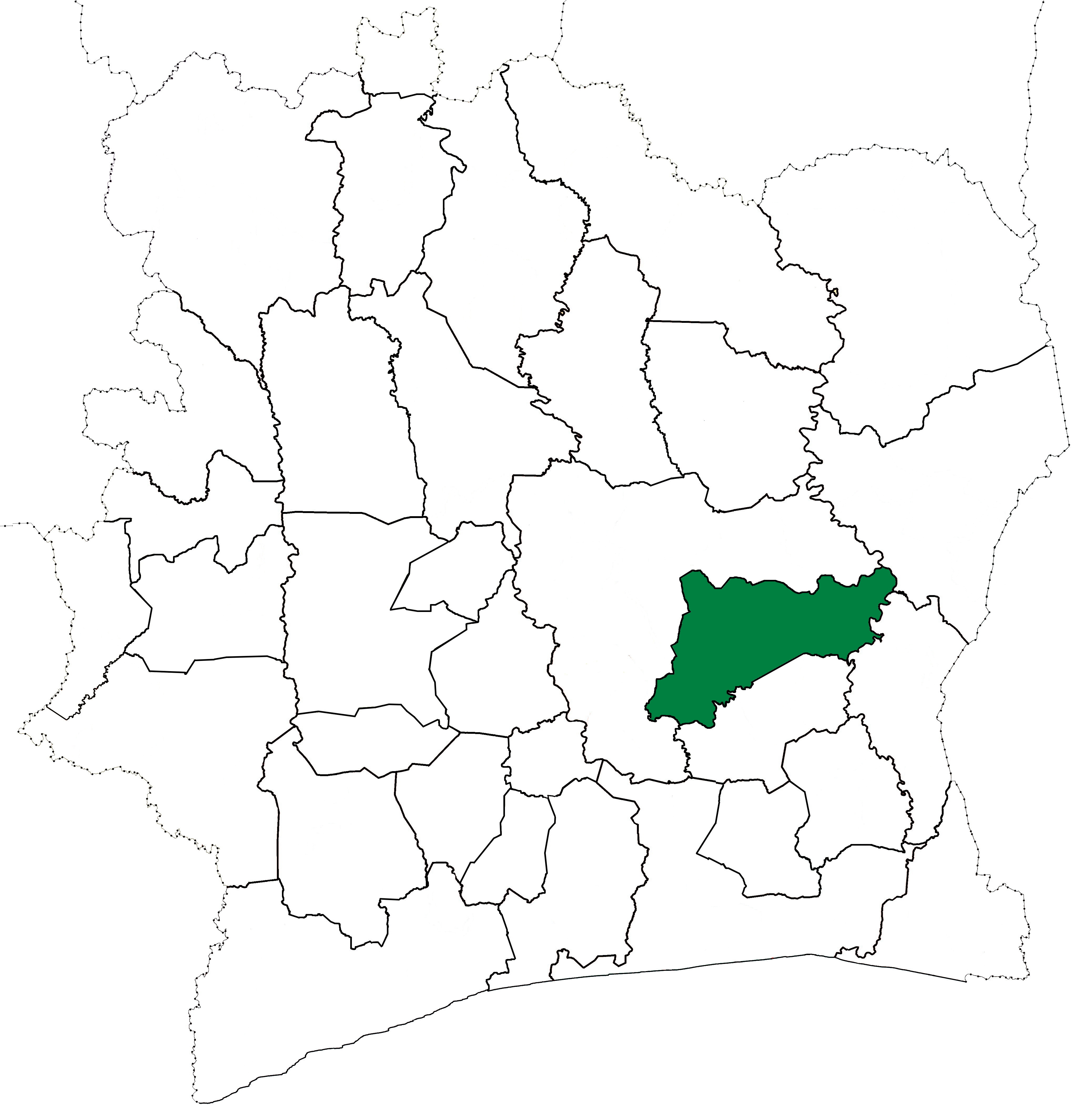
Dimbokro Department from 1980 to 1988.

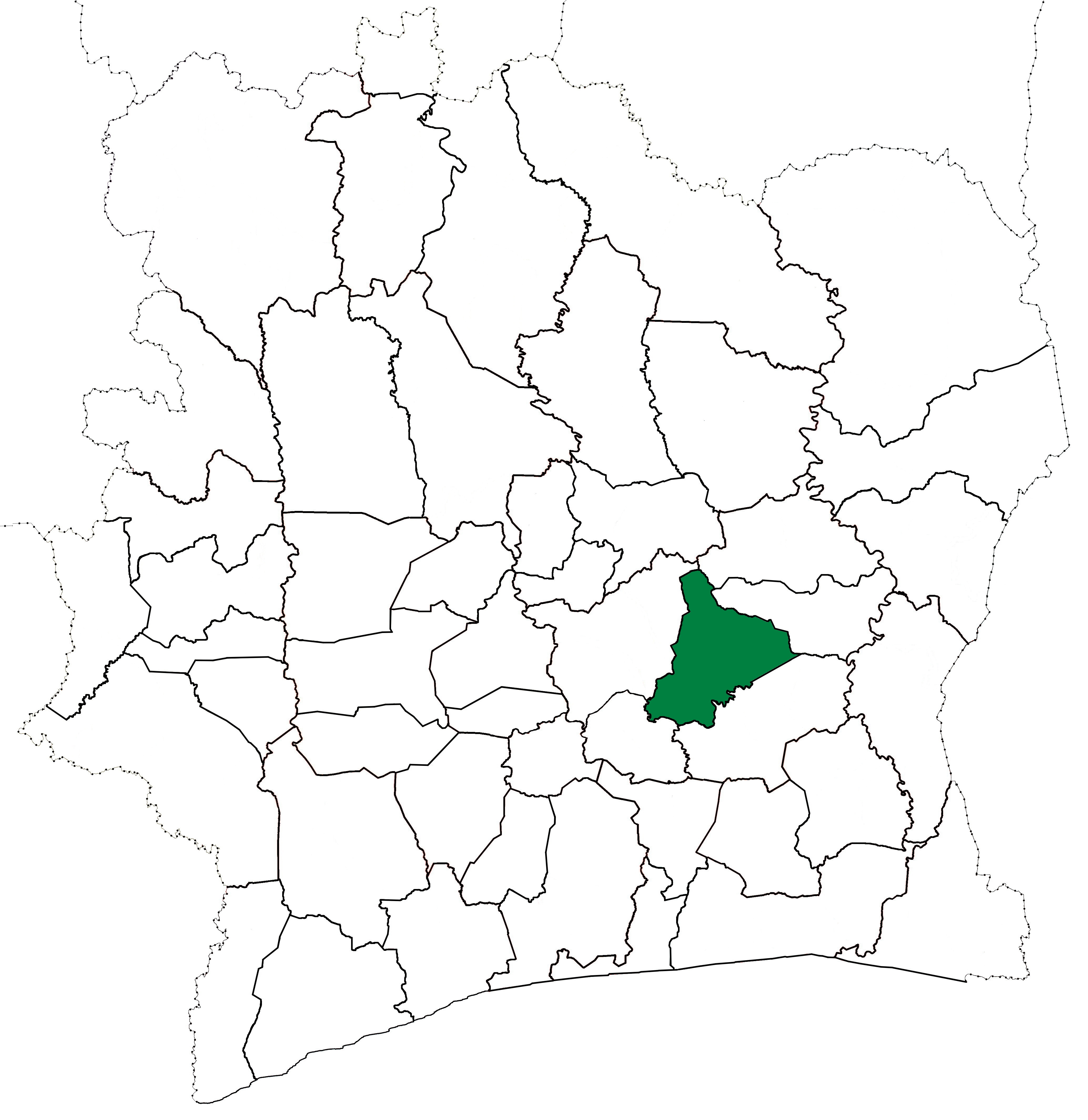
Dimbokro Department from 1988 to 1998.(Other subdivision boundaries began to change in 1995.)
