= 847 Agnia =

Main-belt asteroid

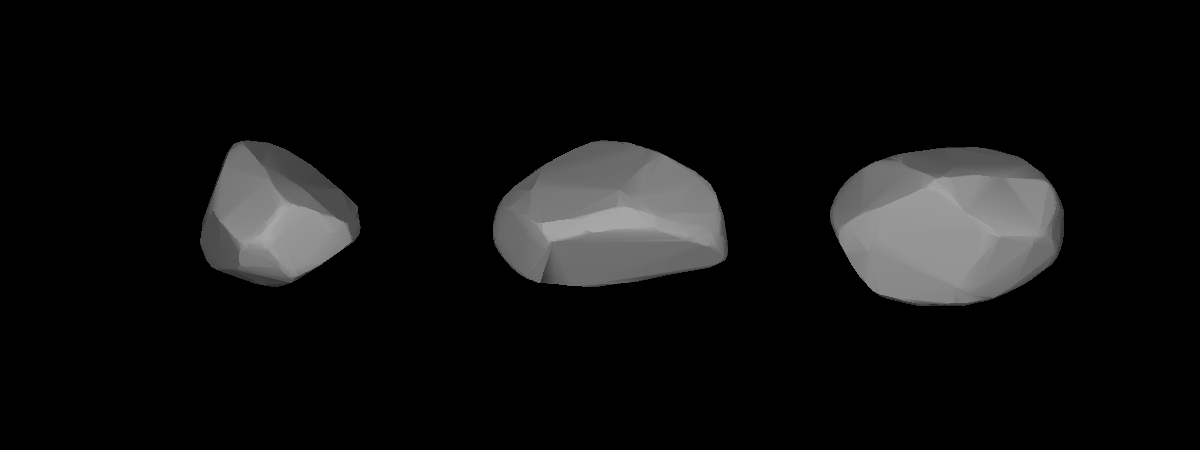
- A three-dimensional model of 847 Agnia based on its light curve

Discovery
- Discovered by: G. N. Neujmin
- Discovery site: Simeis
- Discovery date: 2 September 1915

Designations
- Alternative designations: 1915 XX

Orbital characteristics
- Epoch 31 July 2016 (JD 2457600.5)
- Uncertainty parameter 0
- Observation arc: 109.53 yr (40006 d)
- Aphelion: 3.0472 AU (455.85 Gm)
- Perihelion: 2.5158 AU (376.36 Gm)
- Semi-major axis: 2.7815 AU (416.11 Gm)
- Eccentricity: 0.095516
- Orbital period (sidereal): 4.64 yr (1694.4 d)
- Mean anomaly: 208.04°
- Mean motion: 0° 12^{m} 44.892^{s} / day
- Inclination: 2.4817°
- Longitude of ascending node: 270.935°
- Argument of perihelion: 130.341°
- Earth MOID: 1.52345 AU (227.905 Gm)
- Jupiter MOID: 2.31009 AU (345.585 Gm)
- T_{Jupiter}: 3.325

Physical characteristics
- Mean radius: 14.02±0.85 km
- Synodic rotation period: 14.827 h (0.6178 d)
- Geometric albedo: 0.1720±0.022
- Absolute magnitude (H): 10.29

847 Agnia is a minor planet orbiting the Sun. It is approximately 28 kilometers in diameter. The orbit of 847 Agnia has a semimajor axis of 2.78 AU and a low eccentricity of 0.096, carrying it from 2.52 to 3.05 AU away from the Sun with an orbital period of 4.64 years. The orbital plane is inclined at an angle of 2.48° relative to the plane of the ecliptic.

The spectrum of this object indicates that it is an S-type asteroid with both low and high calcium forms of pyroxene on the surface, along with less than 20% olivine. The high-calcium form of pyroxene forms 40% or more of the total pyroxene present, indicating a history of igneous rock deposits. This suggests that the asteroid underwent differentiation by melting, creating a surface of basalt rock.

847 Agnia is the namesake of the Agnia family of asteroids that share similar orbital elements and physical properties. The members of this family, including 847 Agnia, most likely formed from the breakup of a basalt object, which in turn was spawned from a larger parent body that had previously undergone igneous differentiation. Other members of this family include 1020 Arcadia, 1228 Scabiosa, 2401 Aehlita, and 3395 Jitka.

Photometric observations of this asteroid collected during 2004–2005 show a rotation period of 14.827 ± 0.001 hours with a brightness variation of 0.45 ± 0.03 magnitude.
