= Tiémélékro =

- Town, sub-prefecture, and commune
- Location in Ivory Coast
- Coordinates: 6°30′N 4°37′W
- Country: Ivory Coast
- District: Lacs
- Region: Moronou
- Department: M'Batto

Population (2014)
  - Total: 29,267
- Time zone: UTC+0 (GMT)

Tiémélékro is a town in south-central Ivory Coast. It is a sub-prefecture and commune of M'Batto Department in Moronou Region, Lacs District.

In 2014, the population of the sub-prefecture of Tiémélékro was 29,267.

== Villages ==
The 21 villages of the sub-prefecture of Tiémélékro and their population in 2014 are:

1. Adibrobo (938)
2. Ahouanou 1 (730)
3. Ahouanou 2 (410)
4. Amoikro (624)
5. Bédiakro (587)
6. Diangobo (1 403)
7. Diékabo (961)
8. Djamalabo (543)
9. Ettien-Tiémélékro (227)
10. Frondobo (749)
11. Kongokro (366)
12. Kouadiotékro (1 352)
13. Ménou (1 649)
14. N'gohinou (3 218)
15. Niamien-Mengué (2 041)
16. Sandiébounga (634)
17. Sérébissou (2 824)
18. Télébo (263)
19. Tiémélékro (8 375)
20. Tomidanou (1 291)
21. Yobouébo (82)
