= Bocanda Department =

Coordinates: 7°4′N 4°30′W

Bocanda Department Département de Bocanda
- Department
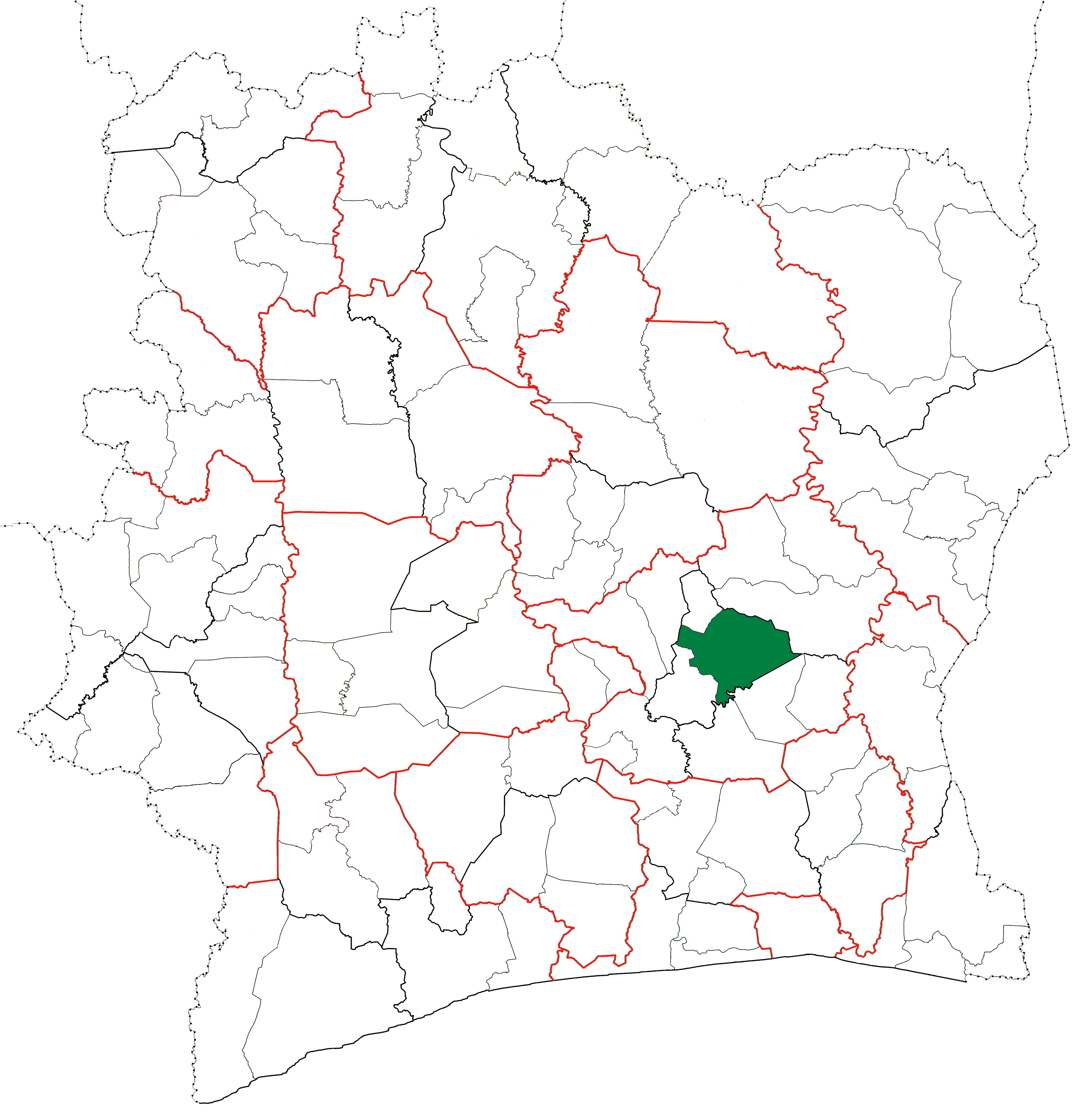
- Location in Ivory Coast. Bocanda Department has had these boundaries since 2012.
- Country: Ivory Coast
- District: Lacs
- Region: N'Zi
- 1998: Established as a second-level subdivision via a division of Dimbokro Dept
- 2011: Converted to a third-level subdivision
- 2012: Divided to create Kouassi-Kouassikro Dept
- Departmental seat: Bocanda

Government
  - Prefect: Gabin Amankou Kassi

Area
  - Total: 2,540 km^{2} (980 sq mi)

Population (2021 census)
  - Total: 121,469
  - Density: 47.8/km^{2} (124/sq mi)
- Time zone: UTC+0 (GMT)

Bocanda Department is a department of N'Zi Region in Lacs District, Ivory Coast. In 2021, its population was 121,469 and its seat is the settlement of Bocanda. The sub-prefectures of the department are Bengassou, Bocanda, Kouadioblékro, and N'Zécrézessou.

== History ==
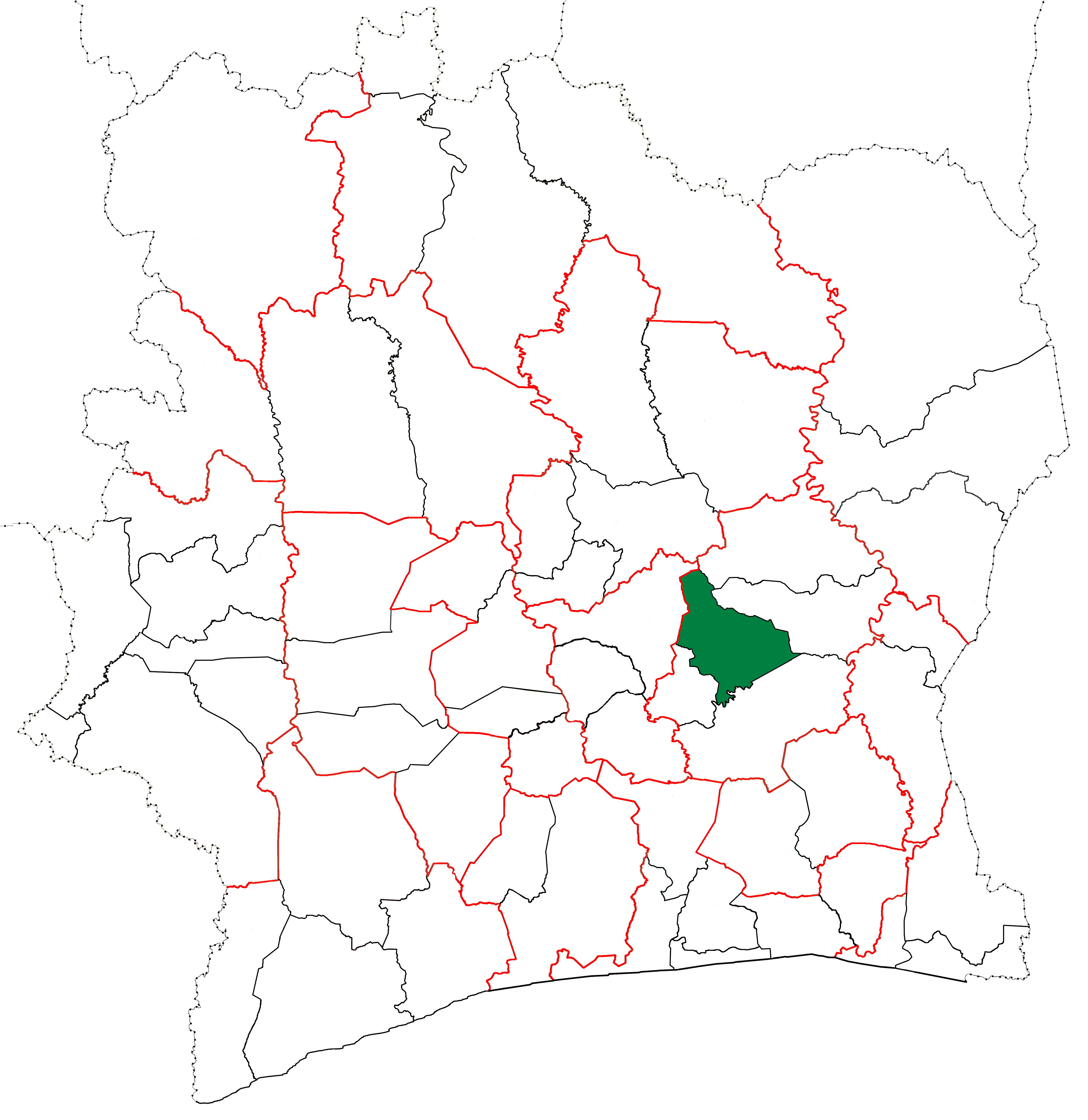
Bocanda Department upon its creation in 1998. It kept these boundaries until 2013, but other subdivision boundary changes began to be made in 2000.

Bocanda Department was created in 1998 as a second-level subdivision via a split-off from Dimbokro Department. At its creation, it was part of N'Zi-Comoé Region.

In 2011, districts were introduced as new first-level subdivisions of Ivory Coast. At the same time, regions were reorganised and became second-level subdivisions and all departments were converted into third-level subdivisions. At this time, Bocanda Department became part of N'Zi Region in Lacs District.

In 2012, Kouassi-Kouassikro sub-prefecture was split from Bocanda Department and divided into two sub-prefectures to create Kouassi-Kouassikro Department.
