= Pascal Affi N'Guessan =

Prime Minister of the Ivory Coast from 2000 to 2003

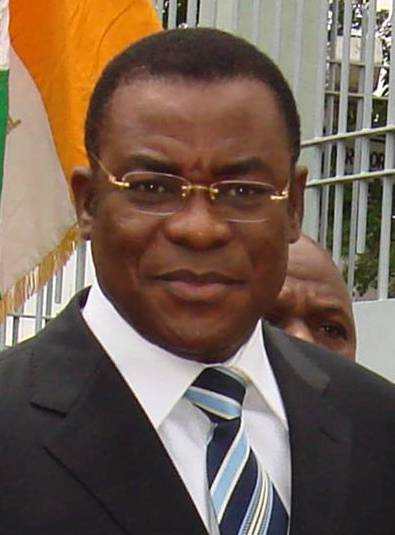
- N'Guessan in 2018

5th Prime Minister of the Ivory Coast
- In office 27 October 2000 – 10 February 2003
- President: Laurent Gbagbo
- Preceded by: Seydou Diarra
- Succeeded by: Seydou Diarra

President of the Ivorian Popular Front
- Incumbent
- Assumed office 22 July 2001
- Preceded by: Laurent Gbagbo

Minister of Planning and Development
- In office 27 October 2000 – 10 February 2003
- President: Laurent Gbagbo
- Prime Minister: Himself
- Preceded by: Seydou Diarra
- Succeeded by: Paul Antoine Bohoun Bouabré

Minister of Economy, Industry and Finance
- In office 24 December 1999 – 27 October 2000
- President: Laurent Gbagbo
- Prime Minister: Seydou Diarra
- Preceded by: Daniel Kablan Duncan
- Succeeded by: Paul Antoine Bohoun Bouabré

Personal details
- Born: 1 January 1953 (age 73) Bouadikro, Bongouanou, Ivory Coast
- Party: Ivorian Popular Front
- Education: Université Félix Houphouët-Boigny; Supélec

Pascal Affi N'Guessan (born 1 January 1953) is an Ivorian politician who served as Prime Minister of Ivory Coast from 2000 to 2003. The leader of the Ivorian Popular Front (FPI), he previously served as Minister of Economy, Industry and Finance from 1999 to 2000.

== Biography ==
N'Guessan was born in Bouadikro in the sub-prefecture of Bongouanou. In 1986, he joined the FPI. He was Mayor of Bongouanou from 1990 to 1996 and vice-president of the Union of Towns and Communes of Côte d'Ivoire (UVICOCI) from 1990 to 1995.

== Political career ==
N'Guessan joined the Secretariat-General of the FPI in 1990, and in 1994 he became Deputy Secretary-General. In January 2000, after a military coup in December 1999, he became Minister of Industry and Tourism under military leader Robert Gueï, serving in that position until October 2000. N'Guessan was the campaign director for FPI candidate Laurent Gbagbo in the October 2000 presidential election, and after Gbagbo's victory he was appointed prime minister.

Gbagbo was constitutionally barred from being party leader after he became president, and at the FPI's Third Extraordinary Congress, held from 20 to 22 July 2001, N'Guessan was elected as President of the FPI, receiving 94.55% of the vote. He was elected as a vice-president of the Socialist International at its 22nd Congress, held from 27 to 29 October 2003 in São Paulo, Brazil.

Following the overthrow of the Gbagbo regime in April 2011 by forces loyal to Alassane Ouattara backed by French and UN forces, N'Guessan was arrested and held at a detention centre in Bouna, north-east Ivory Coast.

On 8 August 2015, N'Guessan was designated as the FPI's presidential candidate for the October 2015 presidential election. He denounced the incarceration of Gbagbo by the International Criminal Court and political conditions under Ouattara: "Peace isn't only the silence of weapons. Can we say that Ivory Coast is in peace when President Gbagbo is in The Hague? With hundreds of political prisoners in jail, Ivory Coast is not in peace." Some hardliners in the FPI did not want to participate in elections as long as Gbagbo remained imprisoned, but others felt the party needed to remain engaged in the electoral process.

In the December 2016 parliamentary election, N'Guessan was elected to the National Assembly as an FPI candidate in Bongouanou Department, receiving 59% of the vote.

He was arrested during the night of 6 to 7 November, shortly after the 2020 Ivorian presidential election. He was allegedly arrested for forming a rival government to that of President Alassane Ouattara.

In October 2021, N'Guessan announced his candidacy for the 2025 presidential election.

In November 2024, Pascal Affi N'Guessan was re-elected as president of the Ivorian Popular Front with 99% of the vote.

Preceded by Seydou Diarra	Prime Minister of Côte d'Ivoire; 2000-2003	Succeeded by Seydou Diarra
