= Bongouanou Department =

Coordinates: 6°39′N 4°12′W

Bongouanou Department Département de Bongouanou
- Department
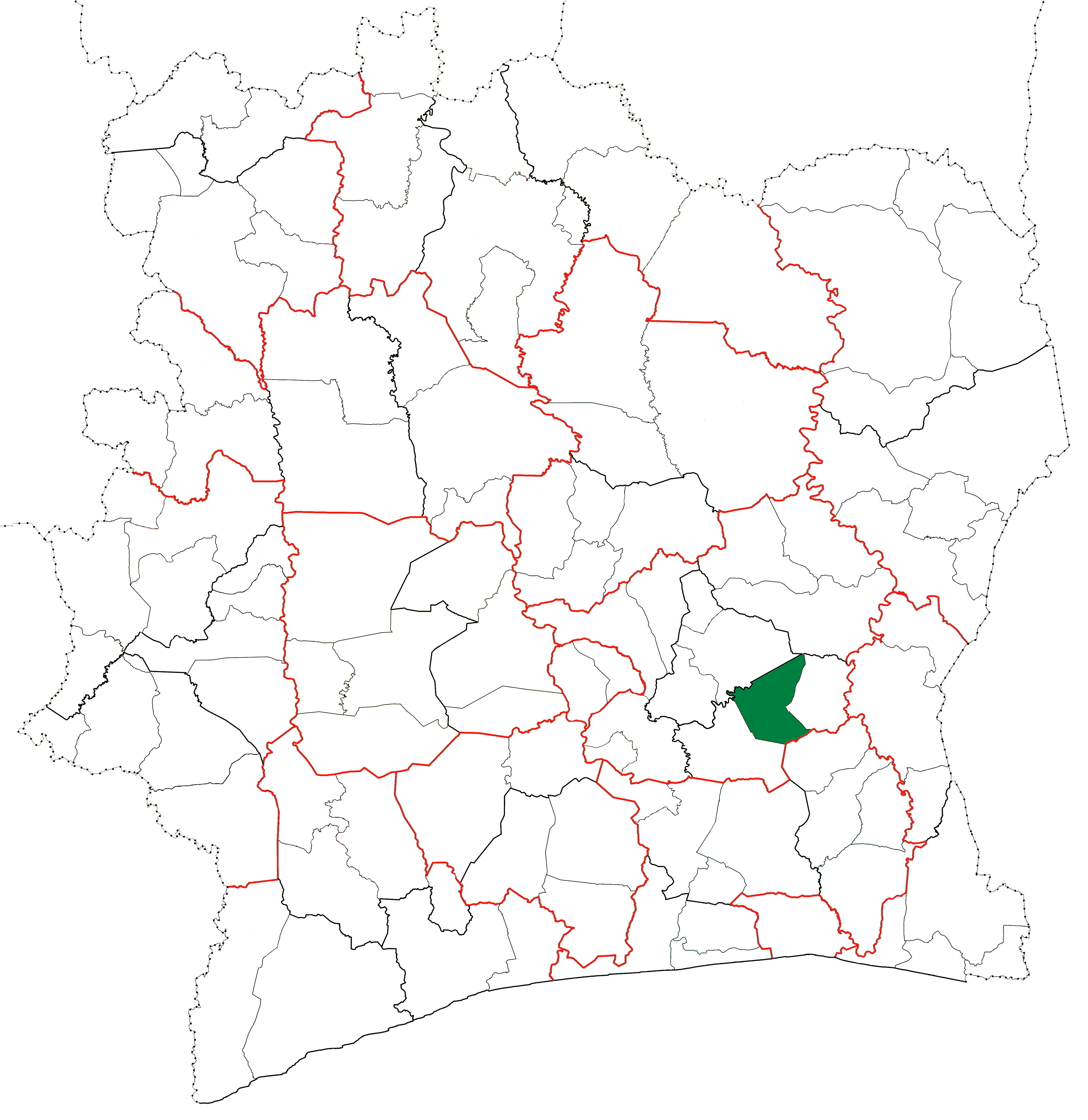
- Location in Ivory Coast. Bongouanou Department has had these boundaries since 2009.
- Country: Ivory Coast
- District: Lacs
- Region: Moronou
- 1980: Established as a first-level subdivision via a division of Dimbokro Dept
- 1997: Converted to a second-level subdivision
- 2009: Divided to create Arrah and M'Batto Depts
- 2011: Converted to a third-level subdivision
- 2012: Transferred from N'Zi Region to new Moronou Region
- Departmental seat: Bongouanou

Government
  - Prefect: Nemlin Houande Henriette Epse Diahi Néssero

Area
  - Total: 1,620 km^{2} (630 sq mi)

Population (2021 census)
  - Total: 193,158
  - Density: 119/km^{2} (309/sq mi)
- Time zone: UTC+0 (GMT)

Bongouanou Department is a department of Moronou Region in Lacs District, Ivory Coast. In 2021, its population was 193,158 and its seat is the settlement of Bongouanou. The sub-prefectures of the department are Andé, Assié-Koumassi, Bongouanou, and N'Guessankro.

== History ==
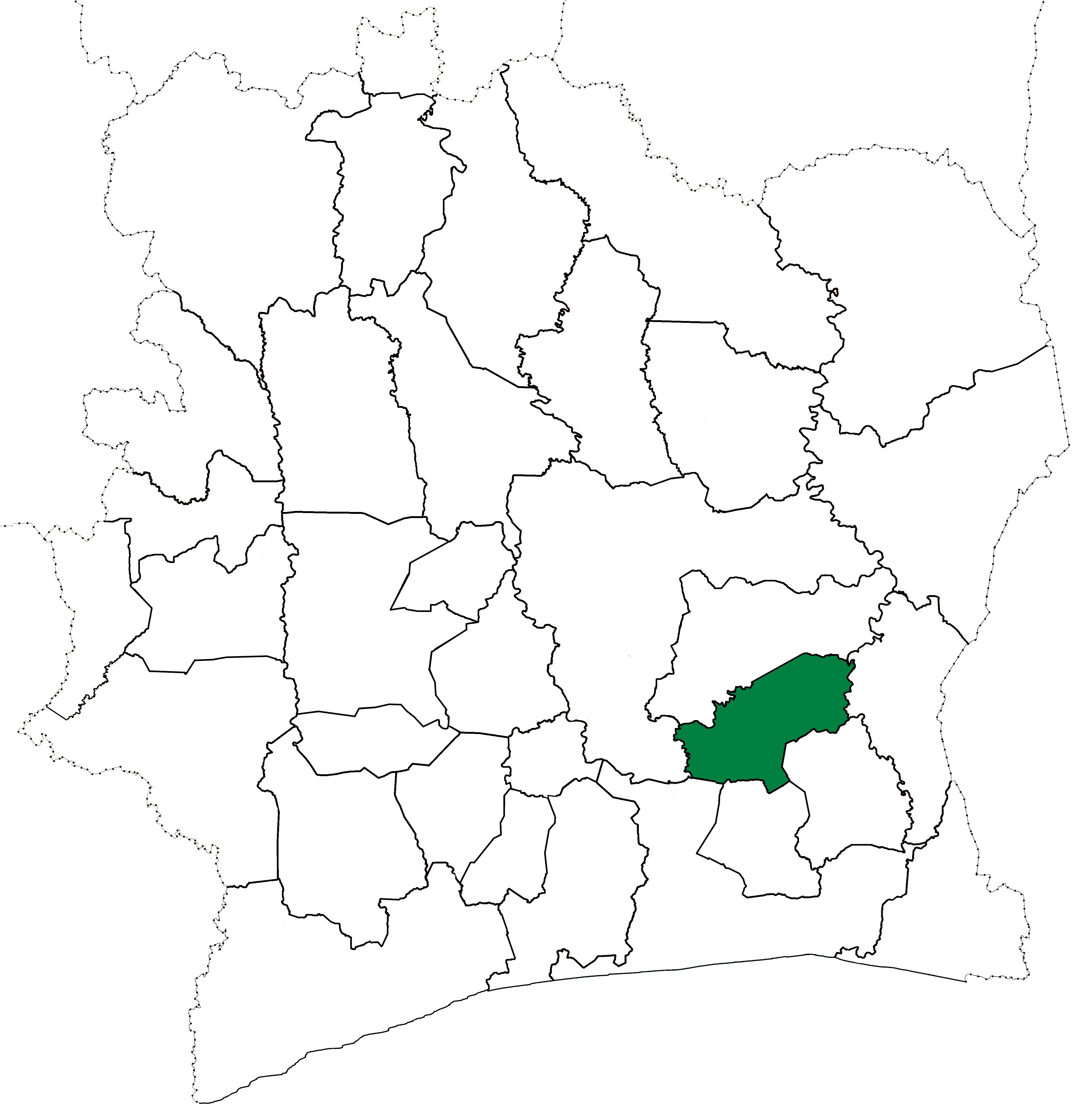
Bongouanou Department upon its creation in 1980. It kept these boundaries until 2009, but other subdivision boundary changes began to be made in 1988.

Bongouanou Department was created in 1980 as a split-off from Dimbokro Department. Using current boundaries as a reference, from 1980 to 2009 the department occupied the same territory as Moronou Region.

In 1997, regions were introduced as new first-level subdivisions of Ivory Coast; as a result, all departments were converted into second-level subdivisions. Bongouanou Department was included in N'Zi-Comoé Region.

In 2009, Bongouanou Department was split into three in order to create Arrah Department and M'Batto Department

In 2011, districts were introduced as new first-level subdivisions of Ivory Coast. At the same time, regions were reorganised and became second-level subdivisions and all departments were converted into third-level subdivisions. At this time, Bongouanou Department became part of N'Zi Region in Lacs District. In 2012, it was joined with Arrah and M'Batto Departments to form the new Moronou Region.
