= M'Batto Department =

Coordinates: 6°28′N 4°22′W

M'Batto Department Département de M'Batto
- Department
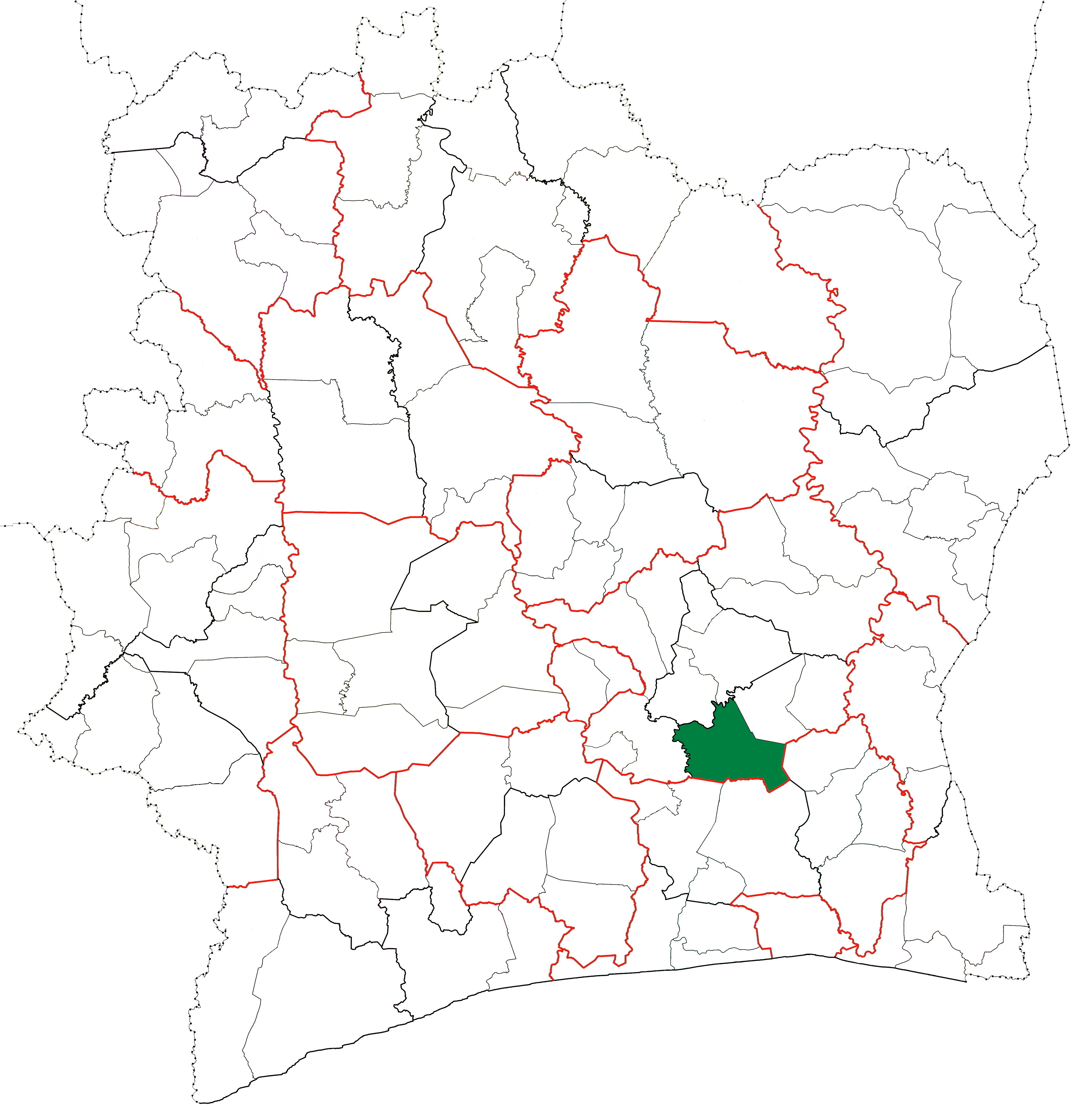
- Location in Ivory Coast. M'Batto Department has retained the same boundaries since its creation in 2009.
- Country: Ivory Coast
- District: Lacs
- Region: Moronou
- 2009: Established as a second-level subdivision via a division of Bongouanou Dept
- 2011: Converted to a third-level subdivision
- 2012: Transferred from N'Zi Region to new Moronou Region
- Departmental seat: M'Batto

Government
  - Prefect: Benoît Tiéhi

Area
  - Total: 2,420 km^{2} (930 sq mi)

Population (2021 census)
  - Total: 142,750
  - Density: 59.0/km^{2} (153/sq mi)
- Time zone: UTC+0 (GMT)

M'Batto Department is a department of Moronou Region in Lacs District, Ivory Coast. In 2021, its population was 142,750 and its seat is the settlement of M'Batto. The sub-prefectures of the department are Anoumaba, Assahara, M'Batto, and Tiémélékro.

== History ==
M'Batto Department was created in 2009 as a second-level subdivision via a split-off from Bongouanou Department. At its creation, it was part of N'Zi-Comoé Region.

In 2011, districts were introduced as new first-level subdivisions of Ivory Coast. At the same time, regions were reorganised and became second-level subdivisions and all departments were converted into third-level subdivisions. At this time, M'Batto Department became part of N'Zi Region in Lacs District. In 2012, it was joined with two other departments to form the new Moronou Region.
