= N'Zi Region =

Coordinates: 6°39′N 4°42′W

N'Zi Region Région du N'Zi
- Region
- Seal

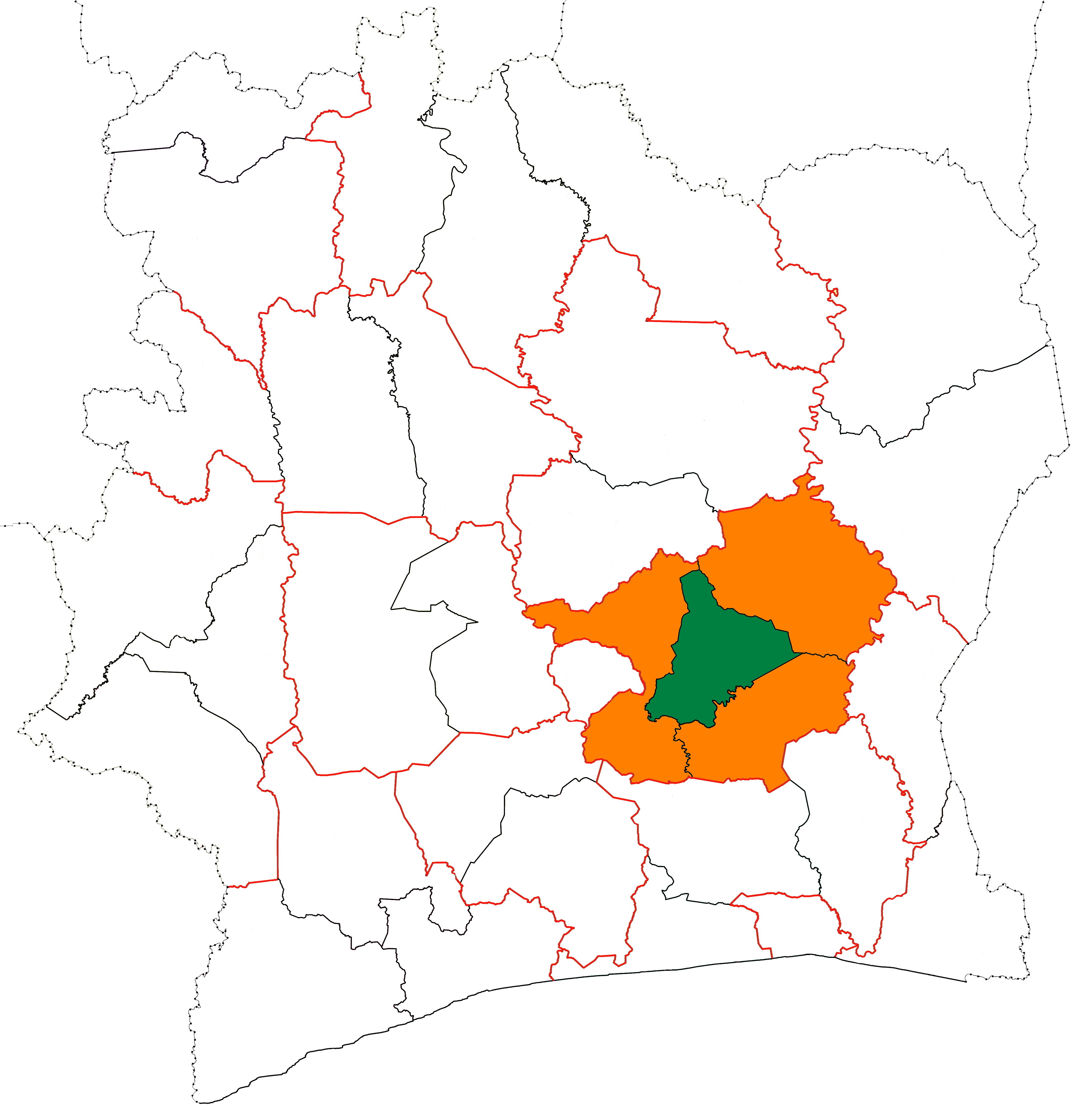
- Location of N'Zi Region (green) in Ivory Coast and in Lacs District
- Country: Ivory Coast
- District: Lacs
- 2011: Established
- 2012: Divided to create Moronou Region
- Regional seat: Dimbokro

Government
  - Prefect: Jacques N'Guessan Obouo
  - Council President: Koffi Bernard N'Guessan

Area
  - Total: 4,710 km^{2} (1,820 sq mi)

Population (2021 census)
  - Total: 254,623
  - Density: 54.1/km^{2} (140/sq mi)
- Time zone: UTC+0 (GMT)
- Website: crnzi.ci

N'Zi Region is one of the 31 regions of Ivory Coast. Since its establishment in 2011, it has been one of the regions in Lacs District. The seat of the region is Dimbokro and the region's population in the 2021 census was 254,623. N'Zi is the only region is the country that does not border another district—it is entirely surrounded by other regions of Lacs District.

N'Zi Region is currently divided into three departments: Bocanda, Dimbokro, and Kouassi-Kouassikro.

== History ==
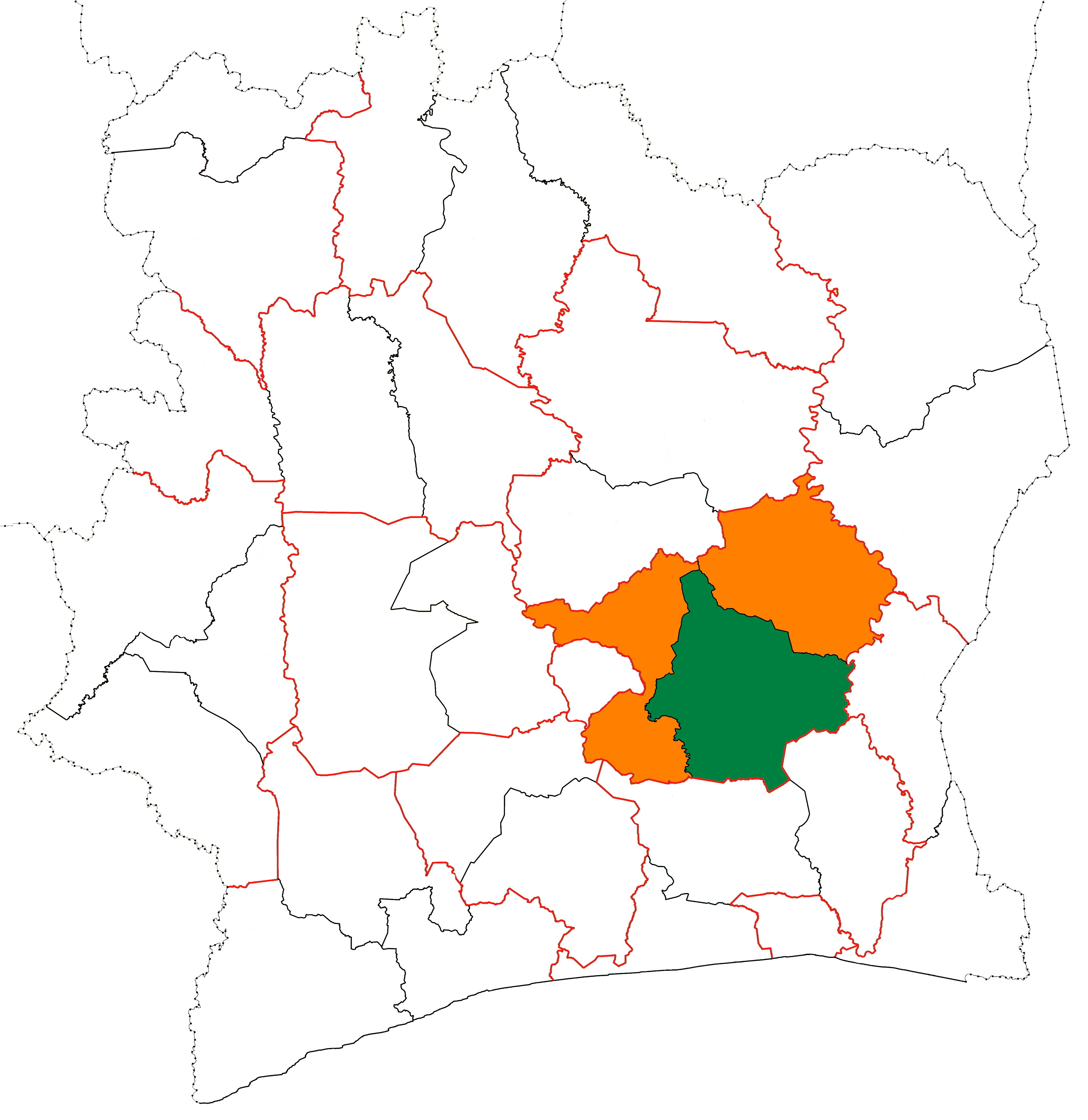
N'Zi Region (green) upon its creation in 2011. N'Zi retained these boundaries until 2012, when it was divided to create Moronou Region.

In 2012, N'Zi Region was divided to create Moronou Region. Arrah, Bongouanou, and M'Batto Departments were removed from N'Zi and became the departments of Moronou.
