= Moronou Region =

Coordinates: 6°39′N 4°12′W

Moronou Region Région du Moronou
- Region
- Seal

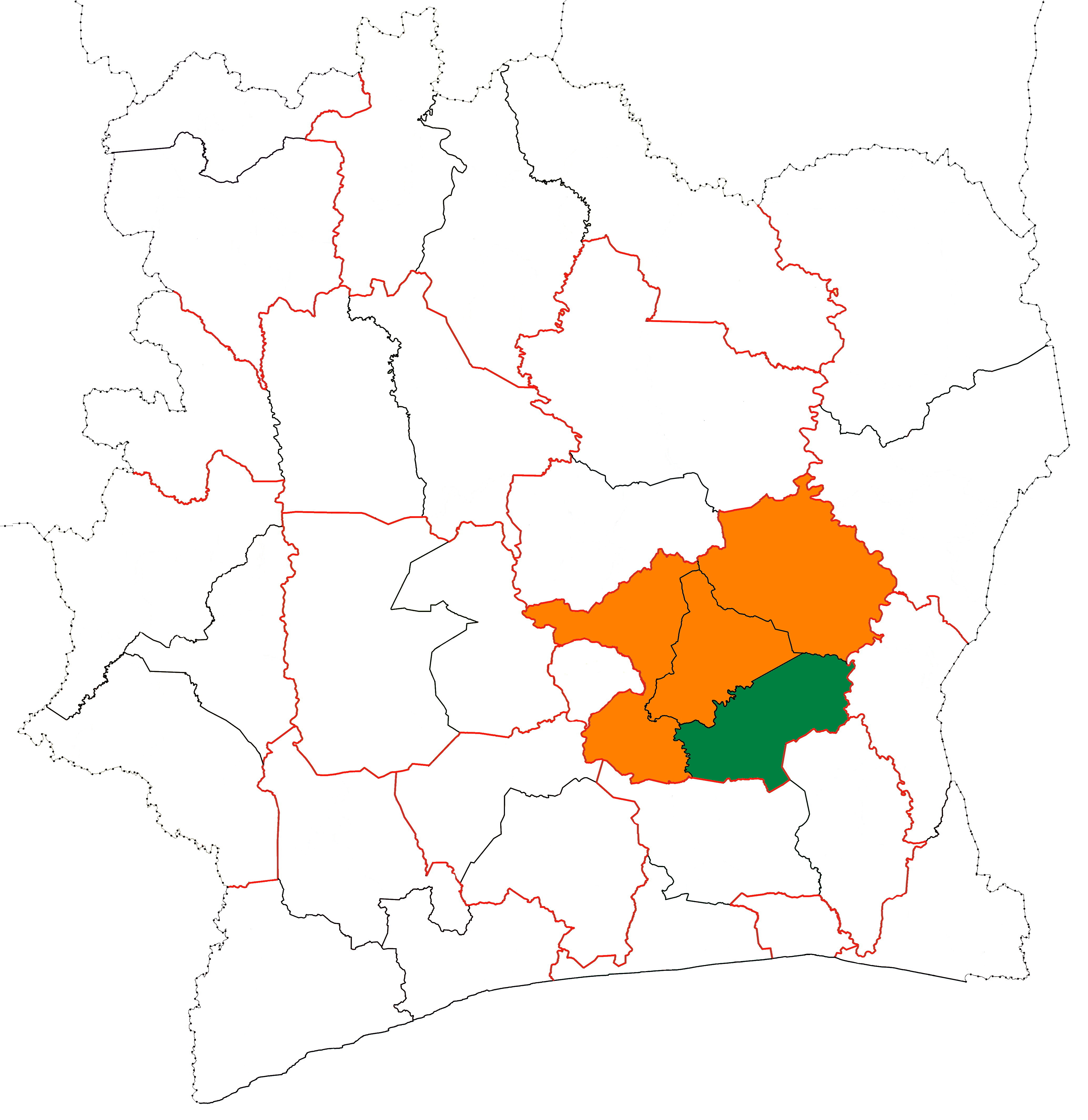
- Location of Moronou Region (green) in Ivory Coast and in Lacs District
- Country: Ivory Coast
- District: Lacs
- 2012: Established via division of N'Zi Region
- Regional seat: Bongouanou

Government
  - Prefect: Nemlin Houande Henriette Epse Diahi Néssero
  - Council President: Pascal Affi N'Guessan

Area
  - Total: 5,580 km^{2} (2,150 sq mi)

Population (2021 census)
  - Total: 439,755
  - Density: 78.8/km^{2} (204/sq mi)
- Time zone: UTC+0 (GMT)

Moronou Region is one of the 31 regions of Ivory Coast. Since its creation in 2012, it has been one of four regions in Lacs District. The seat of the region is Bongouanou and the region's population in the 2021 census was 439,755.

Moronou is currently divided into three departments: Arrah, Bongouanou, and M'Batto.

Moronou is the most recently created region of Ivory Coast. It was formed in 2012 after the other 30 regions had been organised in 2011. Moronou was created by splitting off three departments from N'Zi Region.

== History ==
The Kingdom of Moronou was founded by the Anyi people in the 18th century.

== Regional Council of Moronou ==
=== Election results ===
2013 Ivory Coast Regional Elections: Moronou
Party	Candidate	Votes	%
Independent	Véronique Aka	20,459	46.18
PDCI–RDA	Ahoua N'Doli	13,973	31.54
Independent	Assoumou Mea	6,349	14.33
Independent	Akpoue Brou Jean	3,518	7.94

2018 Ivory Coast Regional Elections: Moronou
Party	Candidate	Votes	%
FPI	Pascal Affi N'Guessan	26,027	43.15
PDCI–RDA	Véronique Aka	25,703	42.61
Independent	Siméon Ané Boni	7,601	12.60
