= Lacs District =

District of Ivory Coast

Coordinates: 6°39′N 4°42′W

Lacs District District des Lacs
- District
- Country: Ivory Coast
- Established: 2011
- Capital: Dimbokro

Area
  - Total: 26,100 km^{2} (10,100 sq mi)

Population (2021 census)
  - Total: 1,488,531
  - Density: 57.0/km^{2} (148/sq mi)
- HDI (2022): 0.542 low · 7th of 14

Lacs District (French: District des Lacs; pronounced [lak], "Lakes") is one of fourteen administrative districts of Ivory Coast. The district is located in the central part of the country. The capital of the district is Dimbokro.

== Creation ==
Lacs District was created in a 2011 administrative reorganisation of the subdivisions of Ivory Coast. The territory of the district was composed by merging the former regions of N'Zi-Comoé and Lacs and removing the area of the Yamoussoukro Autonomous District.

== Administrative divisions ==
Lacs District is currently subdivided into four regions and the following departments:

- Bélier Region (region seat in Yamoussoukro, outside the district)
  - Didiévi Department
  - Djékanou Department
  - Tiébissou Department
  - Toumodi Department
- Iffou Region (region seat in Daoukro)
  - Daoukro Department
  - M'Bahiakro Department
  - Prikro Department
- Moronou Region (region seat in Bongouanou)
  - Arrah Department
  - Bongouanou Department
  - M'Batto Department
- N'zi Region (region seat also in Dimbokro)
  - Bocanda Department
  - Dimbokro Department
  - Kouassi-Kouassikro Department

Moronou Region was created in 2012 as a split-off from N'Zi Region.

== Population ==
According to the 2021 census, Lacs District has a population of 1,488,531.

=== Religion ===
Religion in Lacs (2021 census)
Religion	Percent
Christianity	51.9%
Islam	21.8%
None	19.8%
Traditional	2.2%
Other	4.3%

According to the 2021 census, Christianity forms a slight majority in Lacs (51.9%), followed by Islam (21.8%) and those with no religion (19.8%). A smaller share of residents adhere to traditional religions or other faiths.
