= United Nations Security Council Resolution 2000 =

UN Security Council Resolution 2000
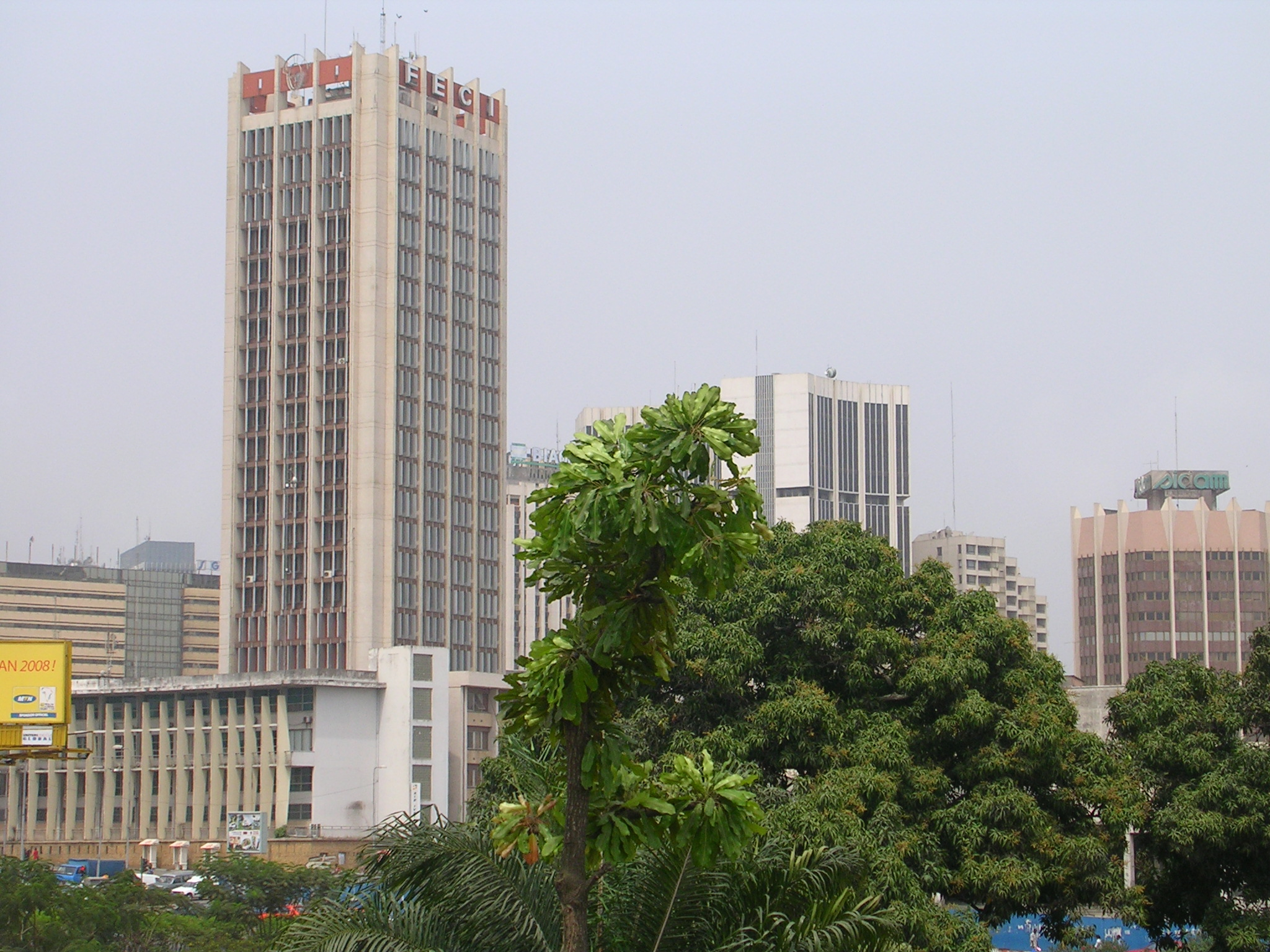
- Centre of the capital Abidjan
- Date: 27 July 2011
- Meeting no.: 6,591
- Code: S/RES/2000 (Document)
- Subject: The situation in Côte d'Ivoire
- Voting summary: 15 voted for; None voted against; None abstained
- Result: Adopted

Security Council composition
- Permanent members: China; France; Russia; United Kingdom; United States
- Non-permanent members: Bosnia–Herzegovina; Brazil; Colombia; Germany; Gabon; India; Lebanon; Nigeria; Portugal; South Africa

United Nations Security Council Resolution 2000, adopted unanimously on July 27, 2011, after recalling previous resolutions on the situation in Côte d'Ivoire (Ivory Coast), including resolutions 1933 (2010), 1942 (2010), 1951 (2010), 1962 (2010), 1967 (2011), 1968 (2011), 1975 (2011), 1980 (2011), 1981 (2011) and 1992 (2011), and Resolution 1938 (2010) on the situation in Liberia, the Council extended the mandate of the United Nations Operation in Côte d'Ivoire (UNOCI) until July 31, 2012.

The decision to extend UNOCI's mandate was taken in light of the political crisis in 2010–11.

== Resolution ==
=== Observations ===
The preamble of the resolution noted that the International Criminal Court wished to open an investigation into possible war crimes and crimes against humanity in Côte d'Ivoire since November 28, 2010. Furthermore, the establishment of the Forces républicaines de Côte d'Ivoire (FRCI) replacing the Forces de sécurité et de défense de Côte d'Ivoire (FDSCI) was acknowledged, in addition to the establishment of a Dialogue, Truth and Reconciliation Commission.

Meanwhile, Council members were aware that there was a high risk of violence against the civilian population, notably by former members of the Republican Guard, militias, mercenaries, escaped prisoners and others. In this context, all violations of human rights and international humanitarian law were condemned.

=== Acts ===
Acting under Chapter VII of the United Nations Charter, the mandate of UNOCI–at its current size of 9,792 troops, 1,350 police and customs officers–was extended until the end of July 2012, along with that of the supporting French forces. The number of police personnel was increased by 205 advisors. The Council stated that such measures were necessary for the "stabilisation of Côte d'Ivoire".

The resolution then address the mandate of UNOCI, which included references to:

- the protection of civilians;
- addressing security and border threats;
- monitoring the arms embargo against the country;
- collecting weapons;
- assisting with the disarmament, demobilisation and reintegration programme;
- reform of the security and rule of law institutions;
- promoting human rights;
- supporting humanitarian assistance;
- supporting elections;
- public information;
- extending the authority of the state throughout the country;
- implementation of the peace process;
- protecting United Nations personnel.

UNOCI was given "all necessary means" to carry out its mandate.

The remainder of the resolution called for further reform and to ensure that the detention of former President Laurent Gbagbo and others was in line with international law. Finally, the Secretary-General Ban Ki-moon was requested to provide reports on the situation in Côte d'Ivoire.

== See also ==
- 2010–11 Ivorian crisis
- First Ivorian Civil War
- Ivorian parliamentary election, 2011
- Ivorian presidential election, 2010
- List of United Nations Security Council Resolutions 1901 to 2000 (2009 – 2011)
- Opération Licorne
- Second Ivorian Civil War
