= United Nations Security Council Resolution 1992 =

UN Security Council Resolution 1992
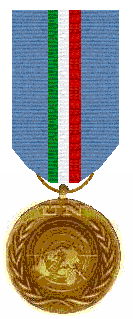
- UNOCI medal
- Date: 29 June 2011
- Meeting no.: 6,570
- Code: S/RES/1992 (Document)
- Subject: The situation in Côte d'Ivoire
- Voting summary: 15 voted for; None voted against; None abstained
- Result: Adopted

Security Council composition
- Permanent members: China; France; Russia; United Kingdom; United States
- Non-permanent members: Bosnia–Herzegovina; Brazil; Colombia; Germany; Gabon; India; Lebanon; Nigeria; Portugal; South Africa

United Nations Security Council Resolution 1992, adopted unanimously on June 29, 2011, after recalling previous resolutions on the situation in Côte d'Ivoire (Ivory Coast), including resolutions 1933 (2010), 1942 (2010), 1951 (2010), 1962 (2010), 1967 (2011), 1968 (2011), 1975 (2011), 1980 (2011) and 1981 (2011), the Council extended the temporary re-deployment of United Nations troops and equipment from the United Nations Mission in Liberia (UNMIL) to the United Nations Operation in Côte d'Ivoire (UNOCI) until September 30, 2011.

== Resolution ==
=== Observations ===
In the preamble of the resolution, the Council recalled co-operation agreements between United Nations peacekeeping missions in Resolution 1609 (2005) and Resolution 1938 (2010) and the role played by troops from UNMIL in the country.

Council members welcomed joint operations along the Liberia-Côte d'Ivoire border by both peacekeeping operations.

=== Acts ===
The Council, acting under Chapter VII of the United Nations Charter, renewed the temporary deployment of UNMIL troops until September 30, 2010. The temporary deployment consisted of three infantry companies, one aviation unit and three armed helicopters with crews. Meanwhile, the resolution also extended the temporary increase of 2,000 additional personnel to UNOCI until July 31, 2011.

Finally, the Secretary-General Ban Ki-moon was to report by September 15, 2011 on inter-mission co-operation.

== See also ==
- 2010–2011 Ivorian crisis
- First Ivorian Civil War
- Ivorian parliamentary election, 2011
- Ivorian presidential election, 2010
- List of United Nations Security Council Resolutions 1901 to 2000 (2009 – 2011)
- Second Ivorian Civil War
