= United Nations Security Council Resolution 1981 =

UN Security Council Resolution 1981
- UNOCI medal
- Date: 13 May 2011
- Meeting no.: 6,535
- Code: S/RES/1981 (Document)
- Subject: The situation in Côte d'Ivoire
- Voting summary: 15 voted for; None voted against; None abstained
- Result: Adopted

Security Council composition
- Permanent members: China; France; Russia; United Kingdom; United States
- Non-permanent members: Bosnia–Herzegovina; Brazil; Colombia; Germany; Gabon; India; Lebanon; Nigeria; Portugal; South Africa

United Nations Security Council Resolution 1981, adopted unanimously on May 13, 2011, after recalling previous resolutions on the situation in Côte d'Ivoire (Ivory Coast), including resolutions 1933 (2010), 1942 (2010), 1946 (2010), 1951 (2010), 1962 (2010), 1967 (2011), 1968 (2011), 1975 (2011) and 1980 (2011), the Council extended the mandate of the United Nations Operation in Côte d'Ivoire (UNOCI) until July 31, 2011 and extended the temporary re-deployment of United Nations troops from Liberia until June 30, 2011.

The temporary deployment of units from Liberia would leave Côte d'Ivoire a month earlier than planned.

== Resolution ==
=== Observations ===
In the preamble of the resolution, the Council recalled co-operation agreements between United Nations peacekeeping missions in Resolution 1609 (2005) and Resolution 1938 (2010) and its intention to deploy more troops from the United Nations Mission in Liberia (UNMIL) to UNOCI on a temporary basis if necessary.

=== Acts ===
The Council, acting under Chapter VII of the United Nations Charter, extended the mandate of UNOCI was renewed until July 31, 2011 and the temporary deployment of UNMIL troops was also extended until June 30, 2010. The temporary deployment consisted of three infantry companies, one aviation unit and three armed helicopters with crews.

Finally, the Secretary-General Ban Ki-moon was to report by the same date on his assessment of the UNOCI mission.

== See also ==
- 2010–2011 Ivorian crisis
- First Ivorian Civil War
- Ivorian parliamentary election, 2011
- Ivorian presidential election, 2010
- List of United Nations Security Council Resolutions 1901 to 2000 (2009–2011)
- Second Ivorian Civil War
