= United Nations Security Council Resolution 1968 =

UN Security Council Resolution 1968
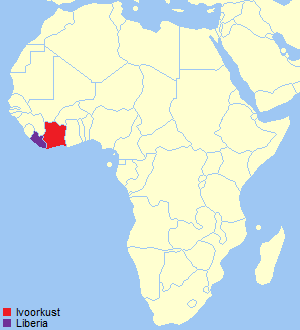
- Ivory Coast (red) and Liberia (purple)
- Date: 16 February 2011
- Meeting no.: 6,482
- Code: S/RES/1968 (Document)
- Subject: The situation in Côte d'Ivoire
- Voting summary: 15 voted for; None voted against; None abstained
- Result: Adopted

Security Council composition
- Permanent members: China; France; Russia; United Kingdom; United States
- Non-permanent members: Bosnia–Herzegovina; Brazil; Colombia; Germany; Gabon; India; Lebanon; Nigeria; Portugal; South Africa

United Nations Security Council Resolution 1968, adopted unanimously on February 16, 2011, after recalling previous resolutions on the situation in Côte d'Ivoire (Ivory Coast), including resolutions 1933 (2010), 1942 (2010), 1946 (2010), 1951 (2010), 1962 (2010) and 1967 (2011), the Council extended the deployment of troops from the United Nations Mission in Liberia (UNMIL) to the United Nations Operation in Côte d'Ivoire (UNOCI) for an additional three months.

The Council recalled inter-mission co-operation agreements outlined in resolutions 1609 (2005) and 1938 (2010). At the same time, it also reiterated that it could authorise the Secretary-General Ban Ki-moon to send additional troops if necessary.

Acting under Chapter VII of the United Nations Charter, the Council authorised the temporary redeployment from UNMIL to UNOCI of three infantry companies, one aviation unit and five helicopters for a further three months. It also urged support from police and troop-contributing countries in that regard.

The resolution was adopted amid the political crisis in Côte d'Ivoire, with Laurent Gbagbo and Alassane Ouattara both being inaugurated as President.

== See also ==
- 2010–2011 Ivorian crisis
- Ivorian Civil War
- Ivorian parliamentary election, 2011
- Ivorian presidential election, 2010
- List of United Nations Security Council Resolutions 1901 to 2000 (2009–2011)
