= United Nations Security Council Resolution 1975 =

UN Security Council Resolution 1975
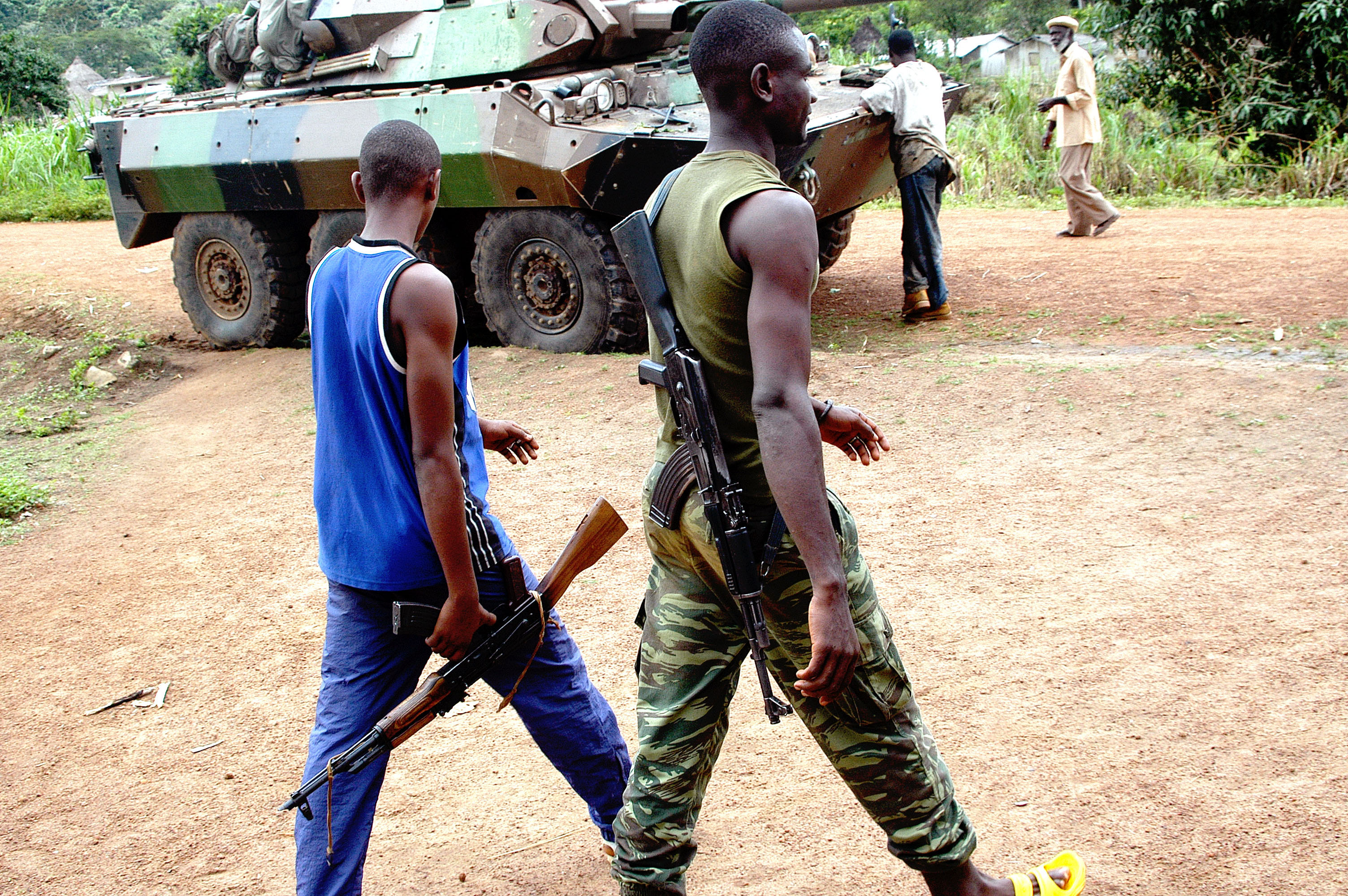
- Rebels in Côte d'Ivoire with AMX 10 RC
- Date: 30 March 2011
- Meeting no.: 6,508
- Code: S/RES/1975 (Document)
- Subject: The situation in Côte d'Ivoire
- Voting summary: 15 voted for; None voted against; None abstained
- Result: Adopted

Security Council composition
- Permanent members: China; France; Russia; United Kingdom; United States
- Non-permanent members: Bosnia–Herzegovina; Brazil; Colombia; Germany; Gabon; India; Lebanon; Nigeria; Portugal; South Africa

United Nations Security Council Resolution 1975, adopted unanimously on March 30, 2011, after recalling previous resolutions on the situation in Côte d'Ivoire (Ivory Coast), including resolutions 1572 (2004), 1893 (2009), 1911 (2010), 1924 (2010), 1933 (2010), 1942 (2010), 1946 (2010), 1951 (2010), 1962 (2010), 1967 (2011) and 1968 (2011), the Council demanded that Laurent Gbagbo step down as President (allowing internationally recognised President Alassane Ouattara to take power) and imposed sanctions on him and his close associates.

The resolution was sponsored by France and Nigeria.

== Resolution ==
=== Observations ===
In the preamble of the resolution, the Council wished for a peaceful, durable and democratic resolution to the crisis in Côte d'Ivoire. It commended the efforts of the African Union and Economic Community of West African States (ECOWAS) to resolve the crisis, and reaffirmed the international recognition given to Alassane Ouattara as President of Côte d'Ivoire.

There was concern at the rapidly deteriorating situation in the country and its possible relapse into a civil war. The Council condemned all provocative actions and violations of human rights and international humanitarian law by any party and called for restraint and the peaceful resolution of their differences. All such violations had to be investigated and those responsible be brought to justice, with the Council considering that attacks on civilians could constitute a crime against humanity.

=== Acts ===
Acting under Chapter VII of the United Nations Charter, the Council urged all Ivorian parties to respect the will of the people and the election of Alassane Ouattara as President of Côte d'Ivoire, as recognised by ECOWAS, the African Union and the rest of the international community. It also demanded an immediate end to violence against civilians. Furthermore, the Ivorian parties were urged to pursue the political solution offered by the African Union, and Laurent Gbagbo was criticised for not accepting the solution and urged to step down.

The resolution condemned attacks by defence forces, militias and mercenaries against United Nations peacekeepers, and urged Laurent Gbagbo's forces and supporters to fully co-operate with the United Nations Operation in Côte d'Ivoire (UNOCI). Furthermore, attacks against civilians were strongly condemned and the Council reiterated that UNOCI could use "all necessary measures" in its mandate to protect civilians under imminent threat of attack.

All Ivorian parties were urged to co-operate with UNOCI and supporting French forces as part of Opération Licorne, by guaranteeing their safety and freedom of movement of Côte d'Ivoire, as well as co-operating with an independent inquiry put in place by the United Nations Human Rights Council. Ivorian state media, including Radiodiffusion Television Ivoirienne, was condemned for inciting violence and restrictions on freedom of expression were urged to be lifted.

There was concern at the increase in the number of refugees and internally displaced persons, particularly in Liberia, and demands that Laurent Gbagbo lift the siege against the hotel where Alassane Ouattara was blockaded and protected by UNOCI troops.

==== Sanctioned individuals ====
Finally, the Council placed financial and travel sanctions on the following individuals for obstructing the peace process:

- Laurent Gbagbo (former President of Côte d'Ivoire);
- Simone Gbagbo (Chairperson of the Parliamentary Group of the Ivorian Popular Front);
- Désiré Tagro (Secretary-General of the presidency of Laurent Gbagbo);
- Pascal Affi N'Guessan (Chairman of the Ivorian Popular Front);
- Alcide Djédjé (close advisor to Laurent Gbagbo).

== See also ==
- 2010–2011 Ivorian crisis
- Ivorian Civil War
- Ivorian presidential election, 2010
- List of United Nations Security Council Resolutions 1901 to 2000 (2009–2011)
