= United Nations Security Council Resolution 1980 =

UN Security Council Resolution 1980
- Flag of Côte d'Ivoire
- Date: 28 April 2011
- Meeting no.: 6,525
- Code: S/RES/1980 (Document)
- Subject: The situation in Côte d’Ivoire
- Voting summary: 15 voted for; None voted against; None abstained
- Result: Adopted

Security Council composition
- Permanent members: China; France; Russia; United Kingdom; United States
- Non-permanent members: Bosnia–Herzegovina; Brazil; Colombia; Germany; Gabon; India; Lebanon; Nigeria; Portugal; South Africa

United Nations Security Council Resolution 1980, adopted unanimously on April 28, 2011, after recalling previous resolutions on the situation in Côte d'Ivoire (Ivory Coast), including resolutions 1880 (2009), 1893 (2009), 1911 (2010), 1933 (2010), 1946 (2010), 1962 (2010) and 1975 (2011), the Council extended an arms embargo, ban on the trade of diamonds and targeted financial and travel sanctions on Ivorian officials until April 30, 2012.

Côte d'Ivoire's ambassador to the United Nations welcomed the adoption of the resolution to bring about "the end of the state of belligerence, from which Cote d'Ivoire has suffered over the past for months."

== Resolution ==
=== Observations ===
The Security Council reiterated that previous resolutions authorising sanctions were taken to contribute to the stability of Côte d'Ivoire and support its peace process. It welcomed the fact that Alassane Ouattara had assumed all the responsibilities of Head of State and condemned all violations of human rights and international humanitarian law.

=== Acts ===
Acting under Chapter VII of the United Nations Charter, the arms embargo, diamond trade ban and financial and travel sanctions against selected Ivorian officials were renewed until April 30, 2012. The Council noted that the removal of the measures was conditional upon the holding of elections, the implementation of important parts of the peace process, the protection of human rights and the stability of the country. The measures would be reviewed by October 31, 2011.

The resolution urged illegal combatants to lay down their arms immediately, which would be collected by peacekeepers from the United Nations Operation in Côte d'Ivoire (UNOCI) and Ivorian government. There was also concern at the presence of mercenaries in Côte d'Ivoire, particularly from neighbouring countries; both Côte d'Ivoire and Liberia were urged to address the problem.

Finally, the Security Council extended the mandate of an expert group monitoring the implementation of sanctions against the country until April 30, 2012.

== See also ==
- 2010–2011 Ivorian crisis
- First Ivorian Civil War
- Ivorian presidential election, 2010
- List of United Nations Security Council Resolutions 1901 to 2000 (2009–2011)
- Second Ivorian Civil War
