= United Nations Security Council Resolution 1967 =

UN Security Council Resolution 1967
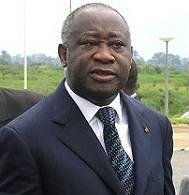
- Laurent Gbagbo
- Date: 19 January 2011
- Meeting no.: 6,469
- Code: S/RES/1967 (Document)
- Subject: The situation in Côte d'Ivoire
- Voting summary: 15 voted for; None voted against; None abstained
- Result: Adopted

Security Council composition
- Permanent members: China; France; Russia; United Kingdom; United States
- Non-permanent members: Bosnia–Herzegovina; Brazil; Colombia; Germany; Gabon; India; Lebanon; Nigeria; Portugal; South Africa

United Nations Security Council Resolution 1967, adopted unanimously on January 19, 2011, after recalling previous resolutions on the situation in Côte d'Ivoire (Ivory Coast), including resolutions 1933 (2010), 1942 (2010), 1946 (2010), 1951 (2010) and 1962 (2010), the Council increased the number of forces in the United Nations Operation in Côte d'Ivoire (UNOCI) by 2,000. It was the first Security Council resolution adopted in 2011.

The resolution would bolster the United Nations peacekeeping forces to 12,000.

== Resolution ==
=== Observations ===
In the preamble of the resolution, the Council recalled that the Secretary-General Ban Ki-moon had recommended the deployment of 2,000 additional peacekeepers on a temporary basis until June 30, 2011, in addition to those authorised in Resolution 1942. The troops may be redeployed between the United Nations Mission in Liberia (UNMIL) and UNOCI, in accordance with Resolution 1609 (2005).

Meanwhile, there was concern at the human rights situation in Côte d'Ivoire and ongoing violence.

=== Acts ===
Acting under Chapter VII of the United Nations Charter, the Council authorised an additional 2,000 troops for UNOCI to remain in the country, along with those authorised in Resolution 1942, until June 30, 2011. Three infantry companies and an aviation unit from UNMIL were authorised to remain in Côte d'Ivoire for a further four weeks if necessary, while three armed helicopters were to be transferred from UNMIL to UNOCI for the same period. The resolution also authorised the deployment of 60 additional police to deal with unarmed crowds. All temporary arrangements would be reviewed by the Secretary-General by March 31, 2011.

The Council demanded that all parties respect the safety and freedom of movement of UNOCI, other United Nations personnel and supporting French forces. Furthermore, it demanded that, without prejudice to freedom of expression, that state media including Radiodiffusion Télévision Ivoirienne, cease propagating false information about the United Nations and incitement to hatred and violence. The Council reiterated the threat of sanctions for those that impeded the work of UNOCI.

== See also ==
- 2010–2011 Ivorian crisis
- Ivorian Civil War
- Ivorian parliamentary election, 2011
- Ivorian presidential election, 2010
- List of United Nations Security Council Resolutions 1901 to 2000 (2009–2011)
