= United Nations Security Council Resolution 1962 =

UN Security Council Resolution 1962
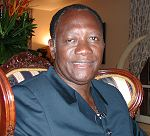
- Alassane Ouattara
- Date: 20 December 2010
- Meeting no.: 6,458
- Code: S/RES/1962 (Document)
- Subject: The situation in Côte d'Ivoire
- Voting summary: 15 voted for; None voted against; None abstained
- Result: Adopted

Security Council composition
- Permanent members: China; France; Russia; United Kingdom; United States
- Non-permanent members: Austria; Bosnia–Herzegovina; Brazil; Gabon; Japan; Lebanon; Mexico; Nigeria; Turkey; Uganda

United Nations Security Council Resolution 1962, adopted unanimously on December 20, 2010, after recalling previous resolutions on the situation in Côte d'Ivoire (Ivory Coast), including resolutions 1893 (2009), 1911 (2010), 1924 (2010), 1933 (2010), 1942 (2010), 1946 (2010) and 1951 (2010), the Council extended the mandate of the United Nations Operation in Côte d'Ivoire (UNOCI) until June 30, 2011 and urged all Ivorian parties to respect the outcome of the presidential election and the recognition of Alassane Ouattara as president.

The mandate of UNOCI was extended despite demands from Laurent Gbagbo to leave the country.

== Resolution ==
=== Observations ===
In the preamble of the resolution, the Council recalled that two rounds of the presidential election were held in Côte d'Ivoire in October and November 2010 and condemned attempts to usurp the will of the people and undermine the electoral process. There was concern at the escalation of violence and all parties were urged to show restraint. The Council welcomed the suspension of Côte d'Ivoire and imposition of sanctions by the Economic Community of West African States (ECOWAS) and African Union until the democratically elected Alassane Ouattara became President.

=== Acts ===
The Council, acting under Chapter VII of the United Nations Charter, called upon Ivorian parties to respect the will of the people results of the election, given the recognition given to Ouattara by ECOWAS and the African Union as President-elect of Côte d'Ivoire. The Secretary-General Ban Ki-moon was asked to facilitate dialogue between the Ivorian parties.

Meanwhile, the mandate of UNOCI was renewed until June 30, 2011 with a total strength of 8,650 personnel. 500 additional personnel would also be deployed, until March 31, 2011, and an additional unit from the United Nations Mission in Liberia (UNMIL) would remain in Côte d'Ivoire for four additional weeks.

Finally, the mandate of French supporting forces was extended until June 30, 2011, and the Secretary-General asked to closely monitor the situation.

== See also ==
- Ivorian Civil War
- Ivorian parliamentary election, 2011
- Ivorian presidential election, 2010
- List of United Nations Security Council Resolutions 1901 to 2000 (2009–2011)
