= United Nations Security Council Resolution 1924 =

UN Security Council Resolution 1924
- House of Deputies in the capital Yamoussoukro
- Date: 27 May 2010
- Meeting no.: 6,323
- Code: S/RES/1924 (Document)
- Subject: The situation in Côte d'Ivoire
- Voting summary: 15 voted for; None voted against; None abstained
- Result: Adopted

Security Council composition
- Permanent members: China; France; Russia; United Kingdom; United States
- Non-permanent members: Austria; Bosnia–Herzegovina; Brazil; Gabon; Japan; Lebanon; Mexico; Nigeria; Turkey; Uganda

United Nations Security Council Resolution 1924, adopted unanimously on May 27, 2010, after reaffirming resolutions 1893 (2009) and 1911 (2010) on the situation in Côte d'Ivoire and Resolution 1885 (2009) on Liberia, the Council extended the mandate of the United Nations Operation in Côte d'Ivoire (UNOCI) until June 30, 2010, pending further recommendations for its revision.

The Security Council noted that time was needed to examine recommendations in the report of the Secretary-General Ban Ki-moon on the situation in the country, which expressed disappointment at setbacks in the Ivorian peace process and suggested increasing UNOCI personnel in higher risk areas to offer support for the elections. Elections have been delayed in the country since 2005; the Secretary-General stating that despite "the temptation to yield to frustration and give up" in the country he did not want to let the people of Côte d'Ivoire down.

The resolution determined that the situation in Côte d'Ivoire constituted a threat to international peace and security in the region and, acting under Chapter VII of the United Nations Charter, extended UNOCI's mandate (determined in Resolution 1739 (2007)) until June 30, 2010. The mandate of 900-strong French force supporting UNOCI was also extended to the same date.

== See also ==
- Ivorian Civil War
- Ivorian parliamentary election, 2010
- Ivorian presidential election, 2010
- List of United Nations Security Council Resolutions 1901 to 2000 (2009–2011)
