= M'Baye Babacar Cissé =

Senegalese diplomat (born 1954)

M’Baye Babacar Cissé (born in 1954) of Senegal is Deputy Special Representative for the United Nations Operation in Côte d’Ivoire (UNOCI). He is also the United Nations Resident Coordinator, Humanitarian Coordinator and United Nations Development Programme (UNDP) Resident Representative in the country. He was appointed to this position by the United Nations Secretary-General on 4 October 2013.

== Career ==
Prior to this appointment, he was Deputy Assistant Administrator and Deputy Regional Director, Regional Bureau for Africa at UNDP. With UNDP, he also served as Country Director in the Democratic Republic of the Congo and Resident Coordinator in Burkina Faso. He joined the United Nations in 1980 and has taken assignment in a number of countries, including Rwanda, Benin, Madagascar and Senegal.

== Personal ==
Cissé graduated from the University of Paris IX Dauphine, France with a master's degree in finance and a diploma in management.

He is married and has two children.
