= Kenya–Liberia relations =

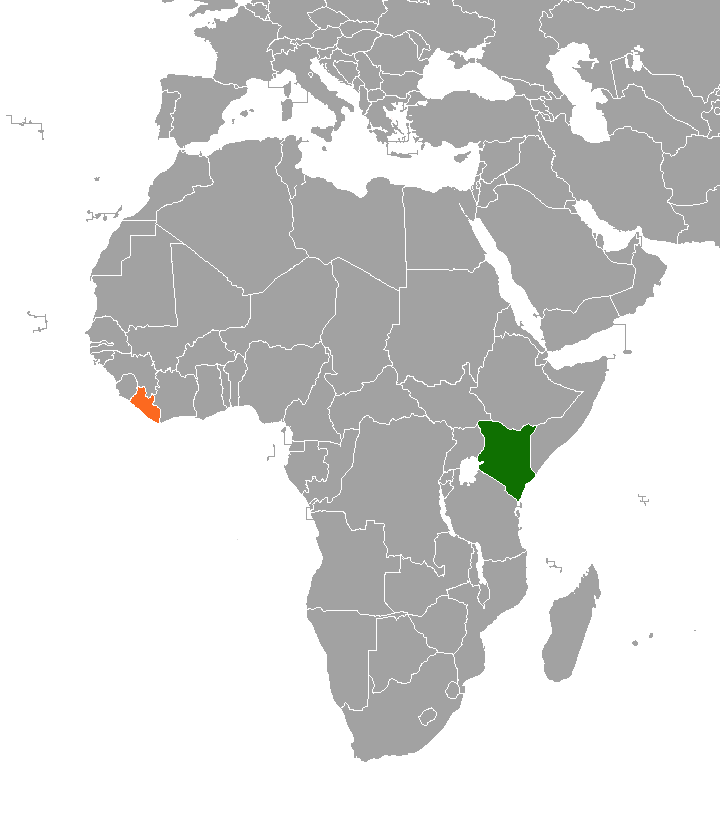

- Kenya: Liberia

Kenya–Liberia relations are bilateral relations between Kenya and Liberia.

== Cooperation ==
Both countries enjoy cordial relations. The first Ambassador of Kenya accredited to Liberia was appointed in 1974, he was known as Raphael Kiilu. In 1976, Liberia was key in solving the Kenya–Uganda border dispute.

Kenya is one of the African Union member states that contributed troops to the United Nations Mission in Liberia (UNMIL). UNMIL's mission was to stabilise Liberia and restructure security in Liberia. The mission is still ongoing as of 2015.

Liberian President Ellen Johnson Sirleaf visited Nairobi in December 2015 for a state visit and to attend the 10th Ministerial Conference of the WTO. She met and held talks with President Uhuru Kenyatta and both leaders agreed to establish a commission that will promote trade and diplomatic relations between both nations. President Sirleaf also thanked Kenya for support to eradicate ebola during the ebola crisis.

A Memorandum of Understanding on Political Consultations were signed during Sirleaf's visit.

Both countries have signed a Bilateral Air Service Agreement (BASA) that's enabled Kenya Airways make three flights per week between Nairobi and Monrovia.

== Ebola virus epidemic ==
During the ebola virus epidemic, Kenya donated US$1 million to Guinea, Liberia and Sierra Leone. However Kenya had also banned travellers from all three countries during the ebola crisis. The ban also applied to travellers who had travelled through any of the three countries.

The national carrier, Kenya Airways, had also suspended flights to the West African nations.

In January 2015, Kenya sent 170 health workers to Sierra Leone and Liberia assist the Ebola-stricken countries.

== Trade ==
Annual trade is considered to be worth US$1 million- US$1.5 million.

Main goods that Kenya exports to Liberia are Iron products/non-alloy steel, household equipment, data processing machines and electric power machinery.

Kenya's main imports from Liberia include; Petroleum oils and oils obtained from bituminous minerals other than crude.

== Diplomatic missions ==
Kenya's high commission in Nigeria is accredited to Liberia.
