= United Nations Security Council Resolution 1938 =

UN Security Council Resolution 1938
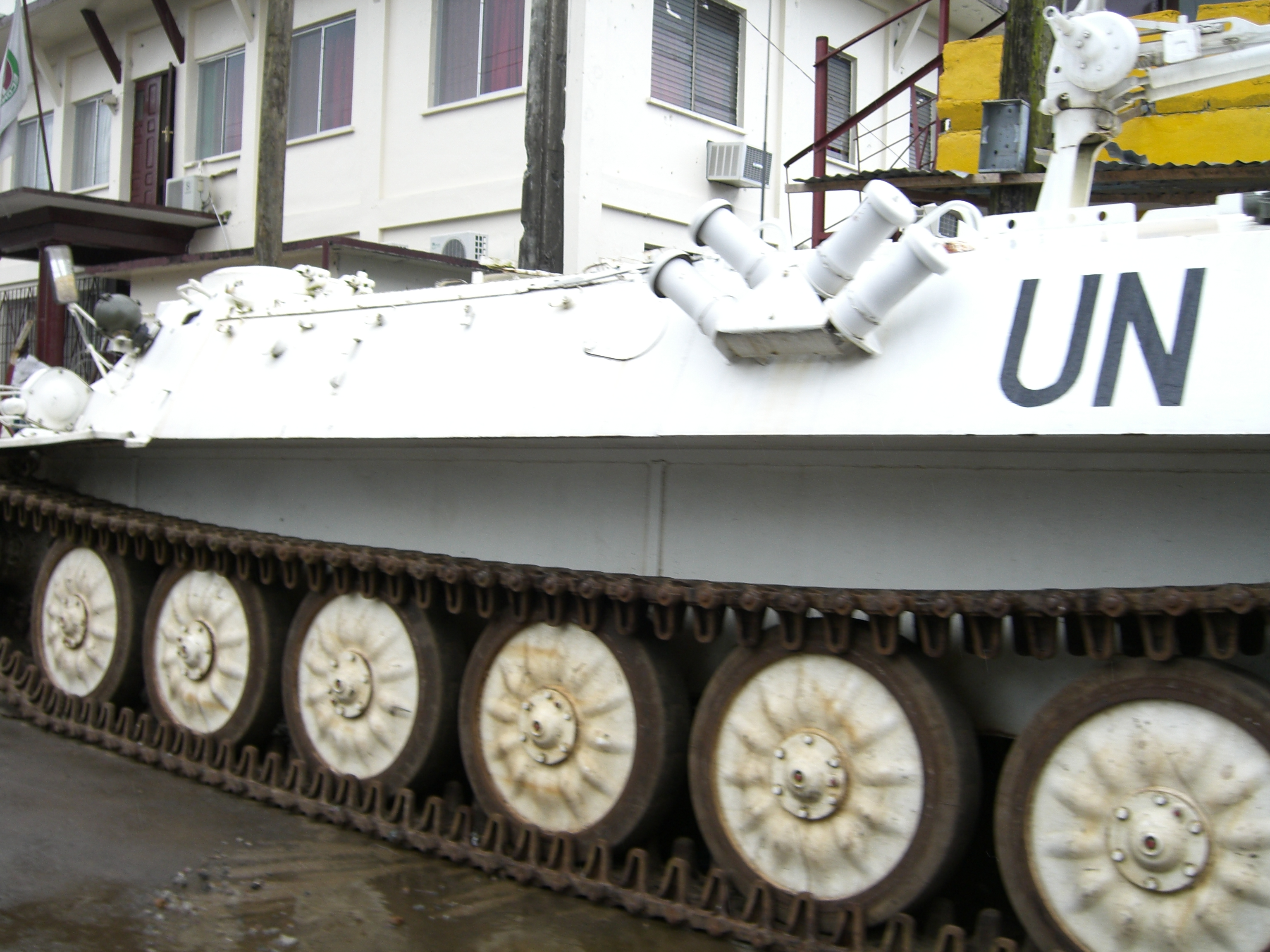
- UNMIL tank in Liberia
- Date: 15 September 2010
- Meeting no.: 6,383
- Code: S/RES/1938 (Document)
- Subject: The situation in Liberia
- Voting summary: 15 voted for; None voted against; None abstained
- Result: Adopted

Security Council composition
- Permanent members: China; France; Russia; United Kingdom; United States
- Non-permanent members: Austria; Bosnia–Herzegovina; Brazil; Gabon; Japan; Lebanon; Mexico; Nigeria; Turkey; Uganda

United Nations Security Council Resolution 1938, adopted unanimously on September 15, 2010, after recalling previous resolutions on the situation in Liberia, including resolutions 1509 (2003), 1626 (2005), 1836 (2005) and 1885 (2009), the Council extended the mandate of the United Nations Mission in Liberia (UNMIL) for a further twelve months until September 30, 2011 and required it to provide electoral assistance.

== Resolution ==
=== Observations ===
In the preamble of the resolution, the Council welcomed efforts of the Liberian government with regard to economic recovery, national reconciliation, combating corruption and promoting good governance. It noted a report from the Truth and Reconciliation Commission as part of a process to move towards national reconciliation and address the root causes of the Liberian conflict. The Council stated that well-functioning government institutions were essential for lasting stability in Liberia and the region.

Meanwhile, the resolution drew attention to the drawdown of the UNMIL mission and the transfer of responsibilities to the Liberian authorities. It acknowledged some progress on reform and recognised further challenges.

=== Acts ===
Acting under Chapter VII of the United Nations Charter, the Council extended UNMIL's mandate and authorised it to assist in preparations for the 2011 general elections. The Liberian authorities were urged to ensure that any outstanding issues were to be addressed to facilitate adequate preparations for the elections. It endorsed the recommendation of the Secretary-General Ban Ki-moon that the conduct of free and fair elections was essential for the drawdown of UNMIL.

The resolution encouraged both UNMIL and the Liberian government to make progress with regard to the transition of responsibilities from the former to the latter, and reaffirmed its decision to redeploy troops if necessary in accordance with Resolution 1609 (2005). The Peacebuilding Commission was request to report on its latest mission to the country and on reform of the security sector, rule of law and national reconciliation.

Finally, the Secretary-General was asked to report on the situation in Liberia and continue monitoring the capabilities of the Liberian National Police and progress with key benchmarks.

== See also ==
- List of United Nations Security Council Resolutions 1901 to 2000 (2009–2011)
- Second Liberian Civil War
