= United Nations Security Council Resolution 1836 =

UN Security Council Resolution 1836
- Date: 29 September 2008
- Meeting no.: 5,985
- Code: S/RES/1836 (Document)
- Subject: The situation in Liberia
- Voting summary: 15 voted for; None voted against; None abstained
- Result: Adopted

Security Council composition
- Permanent members: China; France; Russia; United Kingdom; United States
- Non-permanent members: Burkina Faso; Belgium; Costa Rica; Croatia; Indonesia; Italy; Libya; Panama; South Africa; Vietnam

United Nations Security Council Resolution 1836 was unanimously adopted on 29 September 2008.

== Resolution ==
The Security Council today decided to extend the United Nations Mission in Liberia (UNMIL) for one more year, until 30 September 2009, while adjusting its authorized deployment.

Through its unanimous adoption of resolution 1836 (2008), the body endorsed the Secretary-General’s recommendation of a reduction of 1,460 military personnel and the streamlining of the current four sectors into two, to be carried out between October 2008 and March 2009.

It also endorsed the immediate increase of 240 police, in order to provide expertise in specialized fields, operational support to regular policing and reaction to urgent incidents. Within the overall ceiling, it agreed with the Secretary-General’s plans for internal adjustments in the composition of police components, including an increase in the number of formed police units.

The Council requested the Secretary-General to continue to monitor progress in the peacebuilding benchmarks detailed in his last reports. On the basis of that progress, it asked him to recommend by 15 February 2009 any further adjustments in UNMIL’s deployment, and to include in his report, in consultation with the Government of Liberia, long-range scenarios for a phased drawdown and withdrawal of the Mission’s troops.

In his reports, the Secretary-General was asked to pay particular attention to the building of the Liberian security sector and to make recommendations on adjustments needed to UNMIL’s operations and training in that regard.

Prior to the adoption of the resolution, the President of the Council welcomed the new Permanent Representative of China, who pledged his cooperation with other members and looked forward to China’s presidency next month.

== See also ==
- List of United Nations Security Council Resolutions 1801 to 1900 (2008–2009)
