= Refugees from Ivory Coast =

== Ivorian Refugee Crisis ==
=== Causes of Refugee Crisis ===
Ivory Coast has experienced significant refugee crises in the past twenty years. Much of the early contributors to these crises have resulted from ethnic and civil conflict. In 1993, Ivory Coast's first president Felix Houphouët-Boigny died in office resulting in his successor, Henri Konan Bedié, taking power. What followed this transition of power was a time of growing ethnic tensions between the mostly-Muslim north of the country and the mostly-Christian south. Raised tensions led to a military coup on December 24, 1999, which was then followed by the removal of the leader of the military coup, Robert Guei. The election of a new leader, Laurent Gbagbo, did not decrease tensions and so in September 2002, a costly civil war began that has led to the forced movement of tens of thousands of Ivorians. This conflict increasingly became defined through the high levels of involvement of civilian-based militias. Territories under some of these militias suffered significant civilian targeted violence furthering the forced movements of many Ivorians.

==== Ethnic Tensions ====
The two candidates for the 2010 Ivory Coast election represented two ethnic groups. Importantly the major electoral controversy of this election came in the form of discredited votes. The overwhelming majority of discredited votes came from the mostly Muslim north of the country which had already been suffering economy from controversial cocoa policies.

==== Atrocities and Crimes of the 2011 Ivorian Crisis ====
Though the civil war started in 2002 shortly came to an end further troubles that would increase the amount of forced migration of Ivorians would soon follow In 2010, President Laurent Gbago refused to give up his position after he lost the presidential election to Alassane Ouattara. This dispute led to the 2011 Ivorian Crisis which further dispelled many Ivorians. The ensuing violence led to at least 3,000 civilian deaths. Ivory Coast's sociopolitical environment at the time had factors that encouraged this violence. High levels of armed violence and humanitarian rights occurred with violations by Ivorian armed forces coming in the form of the destroying of property, rape, and large scale executions. These factors coupled with a weakened divided government led to hundreds of thousands of Ivorians seeking shelter in other areas.

==== Economic Factors ====
Further continuing the Ivorian refugee crisis, was the continued decrease of the Ivorian cocoa sector. As one of the largest economic sectors of the country, cocoa farming was and still is essential work for many Ivorians. However, increased deforestation and inconsistent climates had started to cause problems in the early 2000s and these issues have only increased in severity leading to lowered sector productivity. These developments were driven by unbalanced land rent laws sanctioned by the Ivorian government

== International Aid During Refugee Crisis ==
=== Involvement of International Peacekeeping Forces ===
In response to both the 2002 Ivorian Civil War and the 2011 Ivorian Crisis, United Nations peacekeeping forces were quickly sent to Ivory Coast in an effort to protect citizens. Furthermore, French forces joined the United Nations peacekeeping mission. Initially these forces were neutral, yet when the United Nations formally recognized Alassane Ouattara as the rightfully elected president, the peacekeeping forces turned towards aiding Ouattara's military. This move brought controversy in the international community with countries such as Russia and South Africa publicly labelling the move as an overstep in authority.

== Ivorian Refugees in Foreign Countries ==
=== Humanitarian Impacts ===
In 2008, it was measured that over 45,000 Ivorians had been forced to internally move away from violence. By 2011, that number increased to over 300,000 people who had been forced to move inside Ivory Coast. Before 2011, over 30,000 Ivorian refugees had relocated to neighboring West-African countries such as Liberia, Togo, and Ghana. This number skyrocketed further in throughout 2011, where it is estimated that over 150,000 Ivorians sought refuge in Liberia. Overall, it is estimated that at least 160,000 Ivorians fled to nearby West-African countries.

=== Personal Cost ===
Research into the personal impact caused by trauma due to the Ivorian refugee crisis has shown insights into the personal aspects of humanitarian crises. Ivorian refugees in Togo have been found to have clinical post-traumatic stress disorder (PTSD) at very high rates. In a study of 87 refugees 86% of respondents qualified as clinically having PTSD.

The process of assimilation into a foreign society is one that has been found to be challenging for refugees. Immigrants often seen as culturally, ethnically, or religiously different have reported more difficult assimilation experiences. Conflict between local traders/industry leaders and incoming refugees has been observed in countries such as Nigeria. While the dispersement of Ivorian refugees has included a wide array of countries, the majority of Ivorian refugees in the last 20 years have fled to the neighboring country of Liberia. Analysis of the assimilation of Ivorian refugees into Liberian has been investigated. In Liberia, a country that had itself undergone significant civil conflict in the 1990s, residents often were more welcoming to foreign refugees if they had themselves been refugees previously. The influences of war increased Liberian sympathy for ethnically similar refugees. However, the 2011 Ivorian crisis also increased levels of out of group sympathy by Liberians.

== Future Implications ==
The restructuring of Ivory Coast's government has sought to increase legitimacy. However, this push for increased legitimacy has come without an equal push for improved social dynamics. Instead, it has led to a country that is increasingly undemocratic in its institutions. In the aftermath of the 2002 civil war, the government of Ivory Coast attempted to implement a Disarmament, Demobilization, and Reintegration(DDR) program aiming to secure the country's political and social stability. This DDR program quickly took the form of a politically motivated group that aimed to further certain agendas. This past failure of a reintegration process led to increased isolation of Ivorian refugees in neighboring countries. More recently, following the 2011 Ivorian Crisis, increased levels of political arrests (including over 200 during 2017–2018) and rights restrictions have again led to a postwar state that promotes an unwelcoming environment to thousands of Ivorian refugees. Increasing levels of protection by decreasing these politically motivated arrests and attacks for Ivorians refugees is a major factor in getting more Ivorians to repatriate.

In 2012, the International Organization for Migration (IOM) initiated a weekly program with the goal of repatriation for Ivorian refugees. The operation assisted in repatriating 15,000 refugees from Liberia. However, by the end of the operation there were still nearly 80,000 Ivorian refugees estimated to still be in Liberia. In 2021, the UNHCR estimated that a there remained around 91,000 Ivorian refugees across the world with a majority (51,000) in West Africa and a significant minority (22,000) in Europe. The UNHCR also estimated that around 60% of Ivorian refugees who had fled the country during times of crisis had decided to repatriate.
