= United Nations Security Council Resolution 1946 =

UN Security Council Resolution 1946
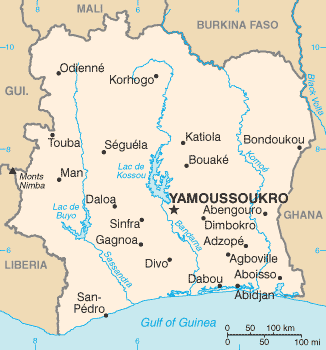
- Côte d'Ivoire
- Date: 15 October 2010
- Meeting no.: 6,402
- Code: S/RES/1946 (Document)
- Subject: The situation in Côte d'Ivoire
- Voting summary: 15 voted for; None voted against; None abstained
- Result: Adopted

Security Council composition
- Permanent members: China; France; Russia; United Kingdom; United States
- Non-permanent members: Austria; Bosnia–Herzegovina; Brazil; Gabon; Japan; Lebanon; Mexico; Nigeria; Turkey; Uganda

United Nations Security Council Resolution 1946, adopted unanimously on October 15, 2010, after recalling previous resolutions on the situation in Côte d'Ivoire (Ivory Coast), including resolutions 1880 (2009), 1893 (2009), 1911 (2010) and 1933 (2010), the Council extended sanctions against the country, including an arms embargo and ban on the trading of diamonds, for a further six months.

The resolution was drafted by France.

== Resolution ==
=== Observations ===
The Security Council stressed that measures imposed in resolutions 1572 (2004) and 1643 (2005) were aimed at supporting the peace process in Côte d'Ivoire, particularly in light of planned presidential elections on October 31, 2010. It urged the Ivorian stakeholders to ensure that the elections went ahead as scheduled, and were free and fair.

The Council noted that while the overall human rights situation had improved in the country, there were still various abuses reported against civilians, including acts of sexual violence. It determined that the situation in Côte d'Ivoire continued to pose a threat to international peace and security.

=== Acts ===
Acting under Chapter VII of the United Nations Charter, the Council renewed sanctions against the country relating to arms, diamonds, financial and travel until April 30, 2011, along with the mandate of the expert panel monitoring their implementation. The measures would be reviewed in light of progress achieved in the electoral and peace process. All Ivorian parties to the Ouagadougou Political Agreement were urged to fully implement the aforementioned measures and provide unhindered access to the expert panel monitoring the sanctions, with the assistance of the United Nations Operation in Côte d'Ivoire (UNOCI). Furthermore, the Council decided that the arms embargo would not apply to non-lethal equipment for use by the Ivorian security forces for proportionate and appropriate purposes. It reaffirmed that measures would be imposed against persons who threatened the peace process, attacked or obstructed UNOCI or supporting French personnel, violate human rights or international humanitarian law or incited hatred and violence; there was also concern that some media outlets were inciting violence.

The resolution asked the Secretary-General Ban Ki-moon and French forces to inform the Council of weapons supplies to Côte d'Ivoire. Meanwhile, the Kimberley Process was instructed to report on production and illicit export of diamonds from Côte d'Ivoire. All Ivorian parties and others were asked to co-operate and to ensure the safety and freedom of movement of the expert group.

== See also ==
- Ivorian Civil War
- Ivorian parliamentary election, 2010
- Ivorian presidential election, 2010
- List of United Nations Security Council Resolutions 1901 to 2000 (2009–2011)
- United Nations Operation in Côte d'Ivoire
