= United Nations Security Council Resolution 1509 =

UN Security Council Resolution 1509
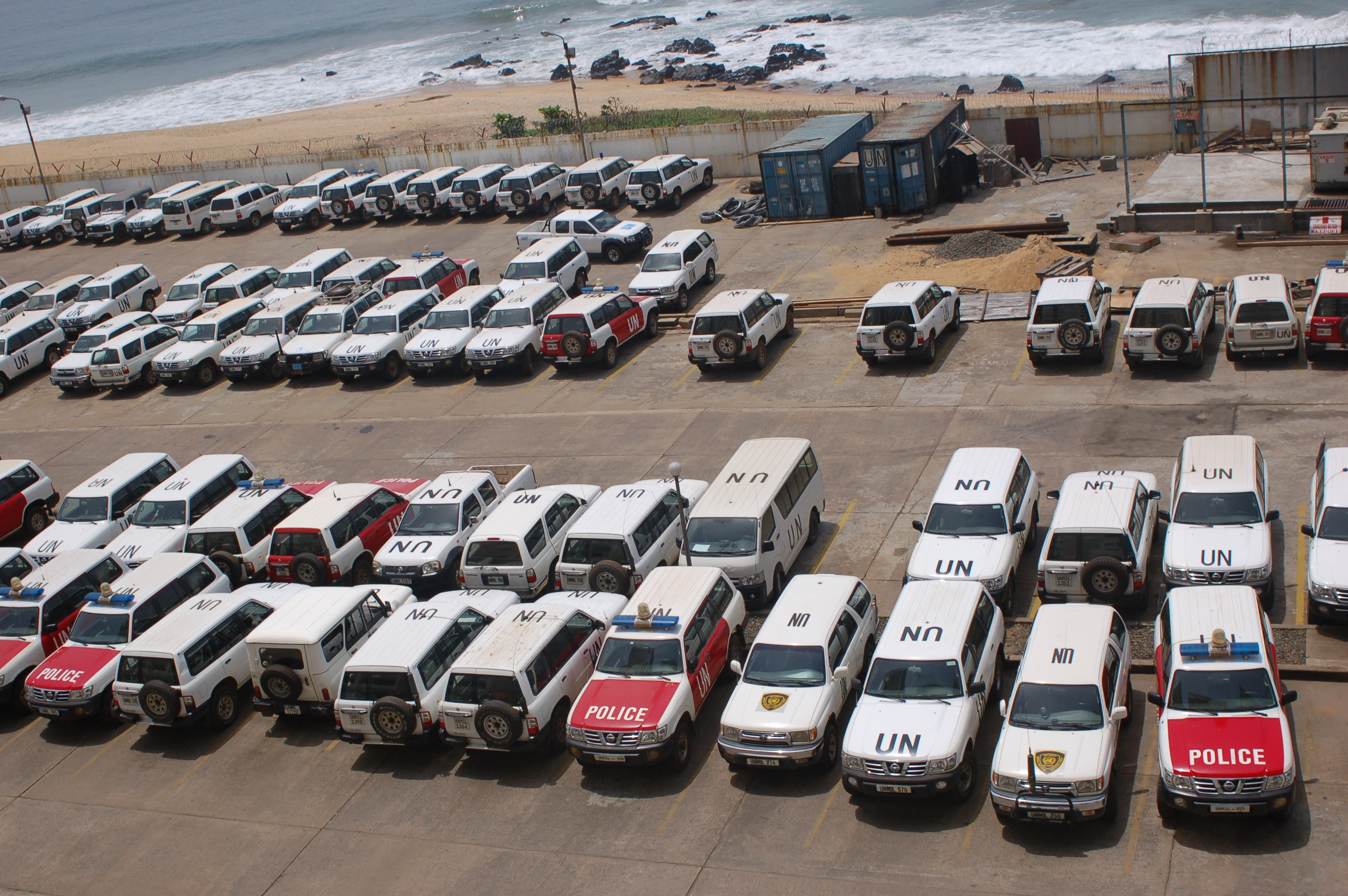
- UNMIL cars in Liberia
- Date: 19 September 2003
- Meeting no.: 4,830
- Code: S/RES/1509 (Document)
- Subject: The situation in Liberia
- Voting summary: 15 voted for; None voted against; None abstained
- Result: Adopted

Security Council composition
- Permanent members: China; France; Russia; United Kingdom; United States
- Non-permanent members: Angola; Bulgaria; Chile; Cameroon; Germany; Guinea; Mexico; Pakistan; Spain; Syria

United Nations Security Council resolution 1509, adopted unanimously on 19 September 2003, after recalling all previous resolutions on the situation in Liberia, including Resolution 1497 (2003), the council established the 15,000-strong United Nations Mission in Liberia (UNMIL) to assist in implementing a ceasefire and peace agreement.

Prior to the resolution's adoption, the council was told that many peacekeepers would be needed to end the "cycle of brutality, violence, corruption and instability." UNMIL was to replace a previous United National authorised West African force in the country from 1 October 2003.

== Resolution ==
=== Observations ===
In the preamble of the resolution, the council expressed concern at the consequences of the prolonged civil war on the civilian population throughout Liberia and stressed the need for humanitarian assistance. It deplored all violations of human rights, including sexual violence against women and children and the use of child soldiers. At the same, it was concerned at the limited access of humanitarian workers to people in need and emphasised the need to safeguard their safety. Once established, the new transitional government had to ensure respect for human rights and the rule of law and an independent judiciary.

The efforts of the Economic Community of West African States (ECOWAS), its mission in Liberia (ECOMIL) and African Union in the country were praised. The Council noted that lasting stability in Liberia would depend on peace in the subregion, and supported the ceasefire agreement signed on 17 June 2003 and Comprehensive Peace Agreement signed on 18 August 2003, further stating that the parties themselves would be responsible for their implementation.

The preamble of the resolution also welcomed the resignation and departure of former president Charles Taylor and the peaceful transfer of power. It recalled that a long-term framework was required to relieve the ECOMIL forces in Liberia, and determined that the situation in Liberia constituted a threat to international peace and security in the region and to West Africa.

=== Acts ===
Acting under Chapter VII of the United Nations Charter, the council established UNMIL for an initial period of twelve months. It would consist of 15,000 military personnel including 250 military observers, 160 staff and 1,115 police. The operation was to be led by the Special Representative of the Secretary-General to Liberia, Jacques Klein. It was given a comprehensive mandate in areas relating to supporting the ceasefire agreement, protecting United Nations personnel and facilities, supporting humanitarian assistance, supporting security reform and implementing the peace process which included elections in 2005.

The resolution demanded the end of hostilities throughout Liberia, the fulfilment of obligations by all parties concerned and co-operation with UNMIL. The Liberian government was asked to conclude a Status of Forces Agreement with the Secretary-General Kofi Annan within 30 days and all Liberian parties had to ensure unimpeded access to the civilian population by humanitarian organisations. The Council recognised the importance of the protection of children in accordance with Resolution 1379 (2001) and related resolutions and further demanded an end to the use of child soldiers. A gender perspective was also highlighted, in accordance with Resolution 1325 (2000) concerning women and girls. Meanwhile, the arms embargo against the country would not apply to UNMIL personnel.

All states were called upon to cease support for military groups in neighbouring countries, while the transitional government in Liberia was requested to restore diplomatic relations with nearby states and the international community. The international community was asked to consider future assistance to Liberia concerning economic development. The council stressed the need for the establishment of United Nations radio stations to inform the Liberian public on the role of UNMIL and the peace process. Referring to the disarmament, demobilisation, reintegration and repatriation programme, the resolution called upon the transitional government, the Liberians United for Reconciliation and Democracy and Movement for Democracy in Liberia to co-operate with UNMIL in the implementation of the process.

Finally, the Secretary-General was instructed to provide regular updates on the situation in Liberia, including a report every 90 days, to the council.

== See also ==
- List of United Nations Security Council Resolutions 1501 to 1600 (2003–2005)
- Second Liberian Civil War
