= Philippe Mangou =

Ivorian military commander (born 1952)

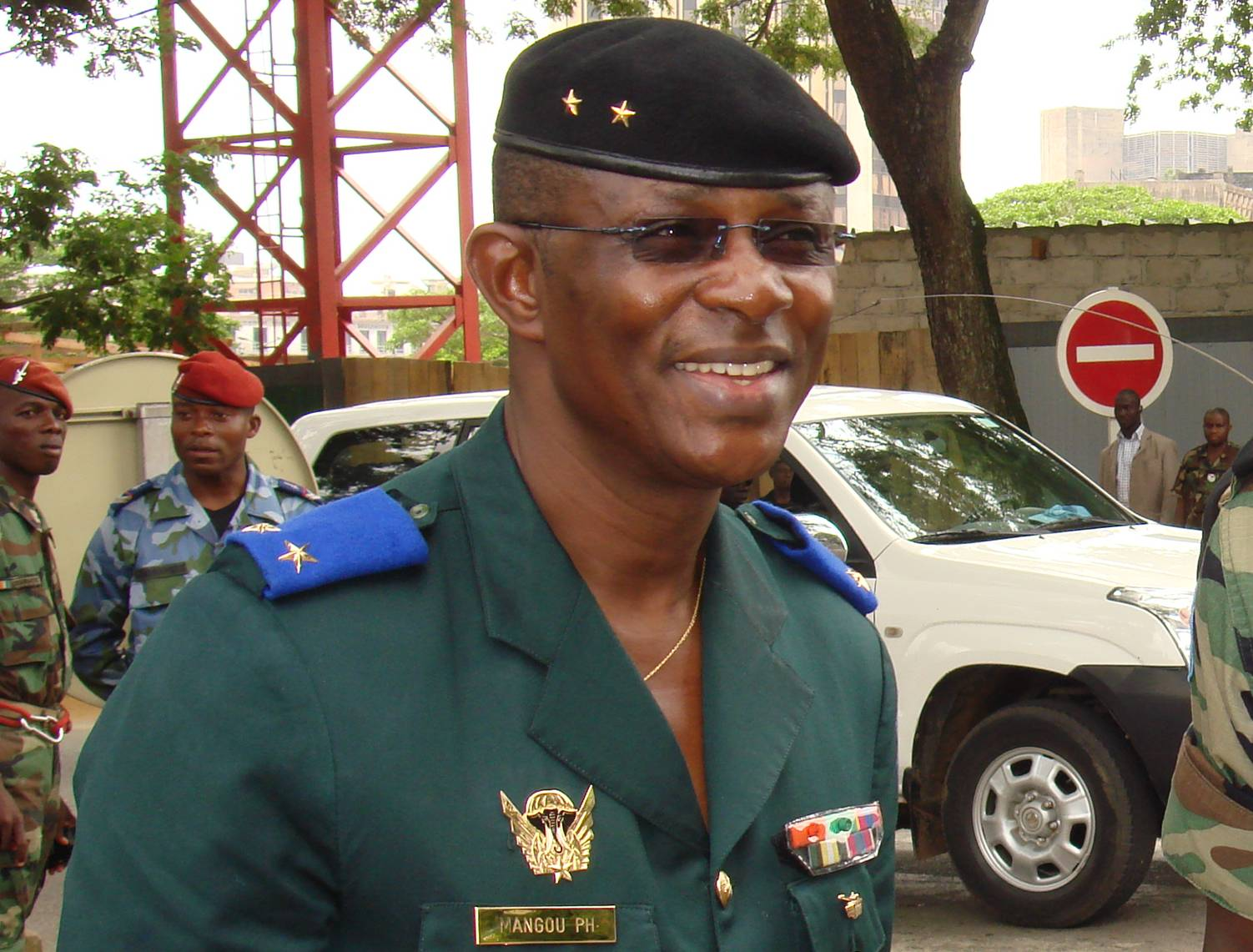
- Philippe Mangou in 2008
- Born: 26 January 1952 (age 74); Abidjan
- Military career
- Allegiance: Laurent Gbagbo
- Service years: since 1978
- Rank: Général de corps d'armée
- Commands: armed forces of Ivory Coast

Philippe Mangou (born 26 January 1952) was the head of the armed forces of Ivory Coast from 2004 until the 2010–2011 Ivorian crisis. In 2012, he started a diplomatic career.

== Biography ==
He studied law at the University of Cocody-Abidjan.

=== Military career (1979-2011) ===
In November 2004, Laurent Gbagbo made him Chef d'État Major des Armées (Chief of the Defence Staff, the ninth in the history of the country), succeeding Mathias Doue.

Long loyal to Gbagbo, Mangou sought refuge in the residence of the South African ambassador on 31 March 2011, as Alassane Ouattara's forces entered Abidjan.

On 4 April 2011, however, Mangou left the South African ambassador's residence in Abidjan and rejoined the government forces. On Ouattara's TV station, Serges Alla, a journalist claimed: "Mangou was forced to leave the South African embassy because some of his relatives were made hostage by diehard supporters of Gbagbo, and Gbagbo militiamen were putting pressure on him, saying they would bomb his village if he doesn't show himself or doesn't return to the Gbagbo army."

=== Diplomatic career (since 2011) ===
After his military career, he became a diplomat in 2012. He was the ambassador of Ivory Coast to Gabon between 2012 and 2019, then to Germany from 2019 to 2024, during his mandate in Germany, his diplomatic scope of practice is extended in 2023 to the Czech Republic and to Poland.
