= United Nations Security Council Resolution 1497 =

UN Security Council Resolution 1497
- Liberia in the African Union
- Date: 1 August 2003
- Meeting no.: 4,803
- Code: S/RES/1497 (Document)
- Subject: The situation in Liberia
- Voting summary: 12 voted for; None voted against; 3 abstained
- Result: Adopted

Security Council composition
- Permanent members: China; France; Russia; United Kingdom; United States
- Non-permanent members: Angola; Bulgaria; Chile; Cameroon; Germany; Guinea; Mexico; Pakistan; Spain; Syria

United Nations Security Council resolution 1497, adopted on 1 August 2003, after expressing concern at the Liberia, the Council authorised a multinational force to intervene in the civil war to support the implementation of a ceasefire agreement using "all necessary measures".

The resolution was adopted by 12 votes to none against and three abstentions from France, Germany and Mexico; the three countries supported the intervention but were opposed to demands from the United States in the resolution that exempted soldiers from countries not party to the Rome Statute of the International Criminal Court (ICC) from its jurisdiction.

== Resolution ==
=== Observations ===
The security council stressed the need to create a secure environment with respect for human rights, humanitarian workers and the well-being for civilians, including children. It recalled the obligation of the Liberian parties to the ceasefire agreement signed in Accra, Ghana on 17 June 2003 and of demands contained in Resolution 1343 (2001) to prevent armed groups from using the territory of states to attack others and destabilise the border regions between Guinea, Liberia and Sierra Leone.

Determining the situation in Liberia to be a threat to international peace and security, the council commended the Economic Community of West African States (ECOWAS) for its efforts and recalled the Secretary-General Kofi Annan's request to deploy an international force in Liberia. Since the request there were disputes over the funding of the mission and who would participate.

=== Acts ===
Acting under Chapter VII of the United Nations Charter, the Council authorised the establishment of a multinational force in Liberia to support the implementation of the 17 June ceasefire agreement. At the same time, it would maintain security following the departure of President Charles Taylor and the installation of a successor authority; create conditions for disarmament, demobilisation and reintegration activities and the delivery of humanitarian aid; and prepare for the deployment of a long-term peacekeeping force (later known as the United Nations Mission in Liberia) by 1 October 2003.

The United Nations Mission in Sierra Leone (UNAMSIL) was asked to give logistical support for a limited 30-day period to ECOWAS elements of the multinational force in Liberia without compromising its mandate in Sierra Leone. States participating in the multinational force could use all necessary measures to fulfill its mandate and all states were asked to contribute to the operation. Meanwhile, soldiers of countries participating in the multinational force that were not party to the ICC were exempted from its jurisdiction. An arms embargo imposed on Liberia would not apply to equipment destined for use by the force, while all states in the region were asked to refrain from actions that could destabilise the borders between Côte d'Ivoire, Guinea, Liberia and Sierra Leone.

The resolution called upon all countries and Liberian parties to co-operate with the multinational force and to ensure the safety and freedom of movement of both the force and humanitarian personnel. The Liberians United for Reconciliation and Democracy and Movement for Democracy in Liberia were urged to uphold the 17 June ceasefire agreement, end violence, agree to an inclusive political framework for a transitional government and refrain from seizing power by force.

The measures in the resolution would be reviewed within 30 days and requested the secretary-general, through his Special Representative, to report periodically on the situation in Liberia to the council.

== See also ==
- List of United Nations Security Council Resolutions 1401 to 1500 (2002–2003)
- Second Liberian Civil War
- Siege of Monrovia
