= United Nations Security Council Resolution 1951 =

UN Security Council Resolution 1951
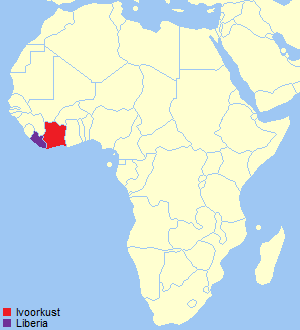
- Côte d'Ivoire (red) and Liberia (purple)
- Date: 24 November 2010
- Meeting no.: 6,431
- Code: S/RES/1951 (Document)
- Subject: The situation in Côte d'Ivoire
- Voting summary: 15 voted for; None voted against; None abstained
- Result: Adopted

Security Council composition
- Permanent members: China; France; Russia; United Kingdom; United States
- Non-permanent members: Austria; Bosnia–Herzegovina; Brazil; Gabon; Japan; Lebanon; Mexico; Nigeria; Turkey; Uganda

United Nations Security Council Resolution 1951, adopted unanimously on November 24, 2010, after recalling previous resolutions on the situation in Côte d'Ivoire (Ivory Coast) and the subregion, the Council authorised a temporary re-deployment of support from the United Nations Mission in Liberia (UNMIL) to the United Nations Operation in Côte d'Ivoire (UNOCI) for a period of four weeks.

The Council had received a letter from the Secretary-General Ban Ki-moon regarding a run-off of the presidential election on November 28, 2010. It recalled provisions in Resolution 1609 (2005) that provided for co-operation between peacekeeping missions of the United Nations.

While acknowledging the need to support UNMIL in the fulfilment of its mandate in Liberia and the threat posed by the situation in Côte d'Ivoire to the subregion, the Council, acting under Chapter VII of the United Nations Charter, authorised a temporary re-deployment of two military helicopters and three infantry companies from UNMIL to UNOCI to provide security for the election for a period of no more than four weeks. The deployment was in addition to an extra 500 troops that were sent to assist with security during the election period.

== See also ==
- Ivorian Civil War
- Ivorian parliamentary election, 2010
- Ivorian presidential election, 2010
- List of United Nations Security Council Resolutions 1901 to 2000 (2009–2011)
