= United Nations Security Council Resolution 1880 =

UN Security Council Resolution 1880
- Date: 30 July 2009
- Meeting no.: 6,174
- Code: S/RES/1880 (Document)
- Subject: The situation in Côte d'Ivoire
- Voting summary: 15 voted for; None voted against; None abstained
- Result: Adopted

Security Council composition
- Permanent members: China; France; Russia; United Kingdom; United States
- Non-permanent members: Austria; Burkina Faso; Costa Rica; Croatia; Japan; Libya; Mexico; Turkey; Uganda; Vietnam

United Nations Security Council Resolution 1880 was unanimously adopted on 30 July 2009.

== Resolution ==
The Security Council today extended the mandate of the United Nations Operation in Côte d'Ivoire (UNOCI), and its authorization of the French forces which support the Operation, until 31 January 2010, in support of the long-postponed presidential elections in that West African country.

By the terms of resolution 1880 (2009), which was unanimously adopted today under Chapter VII of the United Nations Charter, the mission was requested, within its existing resources and mandate, to support the parties in the implementation of the remaining tasks under the Ouagadougou Political Agreement and its Supplementary Agreements, in particular those “that are essential to the holding of a free, fair, open and transparent presidential election of 29 November 2009”.

[Under the Ouagadougou Agreement’s Fourth Supplement, four critical reunification-related issues are to be accomplished by September, or two months ahead of the election: the transfer of authority from Zone Commanders to Prefects; the centralization of the Treasury; the profiling of Forces Nouvelles army elements for army police, gendarmerie and former combatants; and their reintegration, as well as payments.]

By the text adopted today, UNOCI was also asked to continue to support the disarmament, demobilization and reintegration programme and the disarmament and dismantling of militias, and to provide technical and logistical support to the Independent Electoral Commission, so that the elections could be held in a secure environment. Among other things, the Operation would also continue to contribute to the promotion of human rights in Côte d'Ivoire, help to investigate human rights violations with a view to ending impunity, assist the Government in restoring a civilian policing presence throughout the country and provide advice on the restructuring of the internal security services and re-establishment of the judicial authority and the rule of law throughout the country.

== See also ==
- List of United Nations Security Council Resolutions 1801 to 1900 (2008–2009)
