= United Nations Security Council Resolution 1885 =

UN Security Council Resolution 1885
- Date: 15 September 2009
- Meeting no.: 6,188
- Code: S/RES/1885 (Document)
- Subject: The situation in Liberia
- Voting summary: 15 voted for; None voted against; None abstained
- Result: Adopted

Security Council composition
- Permanent members: China; France; Russia; United Kingdom; United States
- Non-permanent members: Austria; Burkina Faso; Costa Rica; Croatia; Japan; Libya; Mexico; Turkey; Uganda; Vietnam

United Nations Security Council Resolution 1885 was unanimously adopted on 15 September 2009.

== Resolution ==
Noting with concern the threats to subregional stability, in particular posed by drug trafficking, organized crime and illicit arms, and reiterating the continuing need for support by the United Nations Mission in Liberia (UNMIL) for the security of the Special Court for Sierra Leone, the Security Council today extended the Mission’s mandate until 30 September 2010.

Unanimously adopting resolution 1885 (2009) and acting under Chapter VII of the United Nations Charter, the Council authorized UNMIL to assist the Liberian Government with the 2011 general presidential and legislative elections, endorsing the Secretary-General’s recommendation that the conduct of free and fair, conflict-free elections be a core benchmark for UNMIL’s future drawdown.

The Council requested the Secretary-General to develop a strategic integrated plan to coordinate activity towards the achievement of benchmarks, emphasizing the need for coherence between, and integration of, peacemaking, peacekeeping, peacebuilding and development to achieve an effective response to post-conflict situations.

The Council further endorsed the Secretary-General’s recommendation to implement the third stage of UNMIL’s drawdown, from October 2009 to May 2010, repatriating 2,029 military personnel, leaving the Mission’s military strength at 8,202 personnel – including 250 at the Special Court for Sierra Leone – and keeping its police component at its current authorized strength.

Reaffirming its intention to authorize the Secretary-General to redeploy troops, as may be needed, between UNMIL and the United Nations Operation in Côte d'Ivoire (UNOCI) on a temporary basis, the Council called on troop-contributing countries to support those efforts.

== See also ==
- List of United Nations Security Council Resolutions 1801 to 1900 (2008–2009)
