= United Nations Security Council Resolution 1911 =

United Nations Security Council resolution

UN Security Council Resolution 1911
- Côte d’Ivoire
- Date: 28 January 2010
- Meeting no.: 6,267
- Code: S/RES/1911 (Document)
- Subject: The situation in Côte d'Ivoire
- Voting summary: 15 voted for; None voted against; None abstained
- Result: Adopted

Security Council composition
- Permanent members: China; France; Russia; United Kingdom; United States
- Non-permanent members: Austria; Bosnia–Herzegovina; Brazil; Gabon; Japan; Lebanon; Mexico; Nigeria; Turkey; Uganda

United Nations Security Council Resolution 1911, adopted unanimously on January 28, 2010, after reaffirming resolutions 1880 (2009) and 1893 (2009), and reiterating its determination to bring about a credible election process in Côte d'Ivoire, the Council approved a four-month extension of the United Nations Operation in Côte d'Ivoire (UNOCI) until the end of May 2010, and a temporary increase in the size of the operation from 7,450 to 7,950 personnel.

The Council also allowed a temporary increase and extension of French peacekeeping forces in the country, including peacekeepers from nearby Burkina Faso to be added to the UNOCI to improve security before the 2010 election process.

The resolution also requested the Secretary-General Ban Ki-moon to report back on the situation in the form of an update in mid-March 2010 and a full report by April 2010.

== See also ==
- Ivorian Civil War
- Ivorian parliamentary election, 2010
- Ivorian presidential election, 2010
- List of United Nations Security Council Resolutions 1901 to 2000 (2009–2011)
