= United Nations Security Council Resolution 1933 =

UN Security Council Resolution 1933
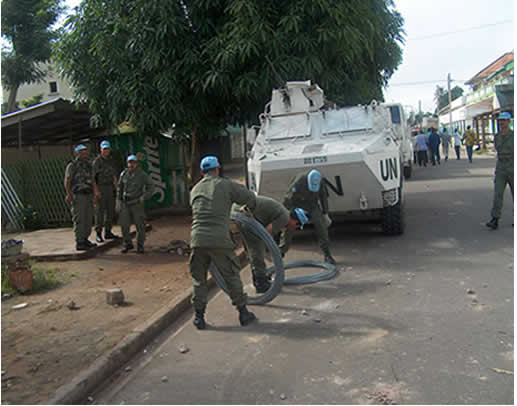
- UNOCI personnel in Côte d'Ivoire
- Date: 30 June 2010
- Meeting no.: 6,350
- Code: S/RES/1933 (Document)
- Subject: The situation in Côte d'Ivoire
- Voting summary: 15 voted for; None voted against; None abstained
- Result: Adopted

Security Council composition
- Permanent members: China; France; Russia; United Kingdom; United States
- Non-permanent members: Austria; Bosnia–Herzegovina; Brazil; Gabon; Japan; Lebanon; Mexico; Nigeria; Turkey; Uganda

United Nations Security Council Resolution 1933, adopted unanimously on June 30, 2010, after reaffirming resolutions 1893 (2009), 1911 (2010) and 1924 (2010) on the situation in Côte d'Ivoire (Ivory Coast) and Resolution 1885 (2009) on the situation in Liberia, the Council extended the mandate of the United Nations Operation in Côte d'Ivoire (UNOCI) and supporting French forces until December 31, 2010, and expanded UNOCI's mandate with provisions to strengthen its capacity to consolidate stability in the country.

== Resolution ==
=== Observations ===
In the preamble of Resolution 1933, the Security Council recalled that it had endorsed the Ouagadougou Political Agreement signed between Ivorian President Laurent Gbagbo and Prime Minister Guillaume Soro in 2007 and follow-up agreements. It appreciated the efforts of the President of Burkina Faso Blaise Compaoré as mediator and supporter of the peace process in Côte d'Ivoire and of the Economic Community of West African States (ECOWAS) for its efforts.

The Council stressed the need for a strategic approach to peacekeeping deployments in which a substantial engagement would lead to durable peace when all parties abided by the obligations. Attempts to destabilise the peace process were strongly condemned, and there was concern at continued violations of human rights and international humanitarian law in parts of the country despite attempts to improve the situation.

=== Acts ===
Acting under Chapter VII of the United Nations Charter, the Council expressed concern at the continued delay of elections in Côte d'Ivoire, urging Ivorian stakeholders to publish the final voters list without delay that was crucial for holding free, fair and transparent elections. It reiterated that the Special Representative of the Secretary-General had a role in the certification of the electoral process and of the involvement of Ivorian society in the process with full respect for human rights. Political parties had to comply with a code of good conduct and it was important that the population had access to diverse information through the media.

The international community was urged to provide assistance to the electoral process in Côte d'Ivoire by the provision of election observers and technical assistance. The Ivorian people were called upon to refrain from calls for hatred, violence or intolerance, and noted that the Secretary-General Ban Ki-moon called for sanctions against those in media who publicly incited violence and political tensions in his report. Ivorian parties were urged to make progress with regard to disarmament, identification and reunification operations and the issue of displaced persons. All reported human rights violations, particularly sexual violence, was condemned by the Council.

UNOCI was issued with a newly expanded and comprehensive mandate to effectively support parties to the Ouagadougou Political Agreement. The new mandate included provisions relating to monitoring armed groups; protecting civilians; monitoring the arms embargo; public information; human rights; humanitarian assistance; support for the elections; identification operations; disarmament, demobilisation and reintegration of former militia and storage of weapons; redeployment of Ivorian state administration throughout the country; security sector reform; mediation; and the protection of United Nations personnel. It was further authorised to carry out all necessary means to enforce its mandate.

All Ivorian parties were urged to guarantee the safety, security and freedom of movement for UNOCI and supporting French forces. The resolution decided that UNOCI would comprise a total of 8,650, which included 7,392 military and 1,250 police personnel. The Security Council expressed its intention to temporarily increase the number of UNOCI personnel by up to 500 before and after the elections. The supporting French forces also had their mandate extended until December 31, 2010 by which a review of UNOCI would have taken place by the Council.

Finally, the Secretary-General was requested to report on all aspects of the situation in Côte d'Ivoire, particularly with regard to the protection and promotion of human rights and international humanitarian law. He was asked to monitor compliance by UNOCI with the United Nations zero-tolerance policy on sexual exploitation, report on the achievement of benchmarks in the political process and inform the Council of the final publication of the voters list by October 22, 2010.

== See also ==
- Ivorian Civil War
- Ivorian parliamentary election, 2010
- Ivorian presidential election, 2010
- List of United Nations Security Council Resolutions 1901 to 2000 (2009–2011)
