= United Nations Security Council Resolution 1942 =

UN Security Council Resolution 1942
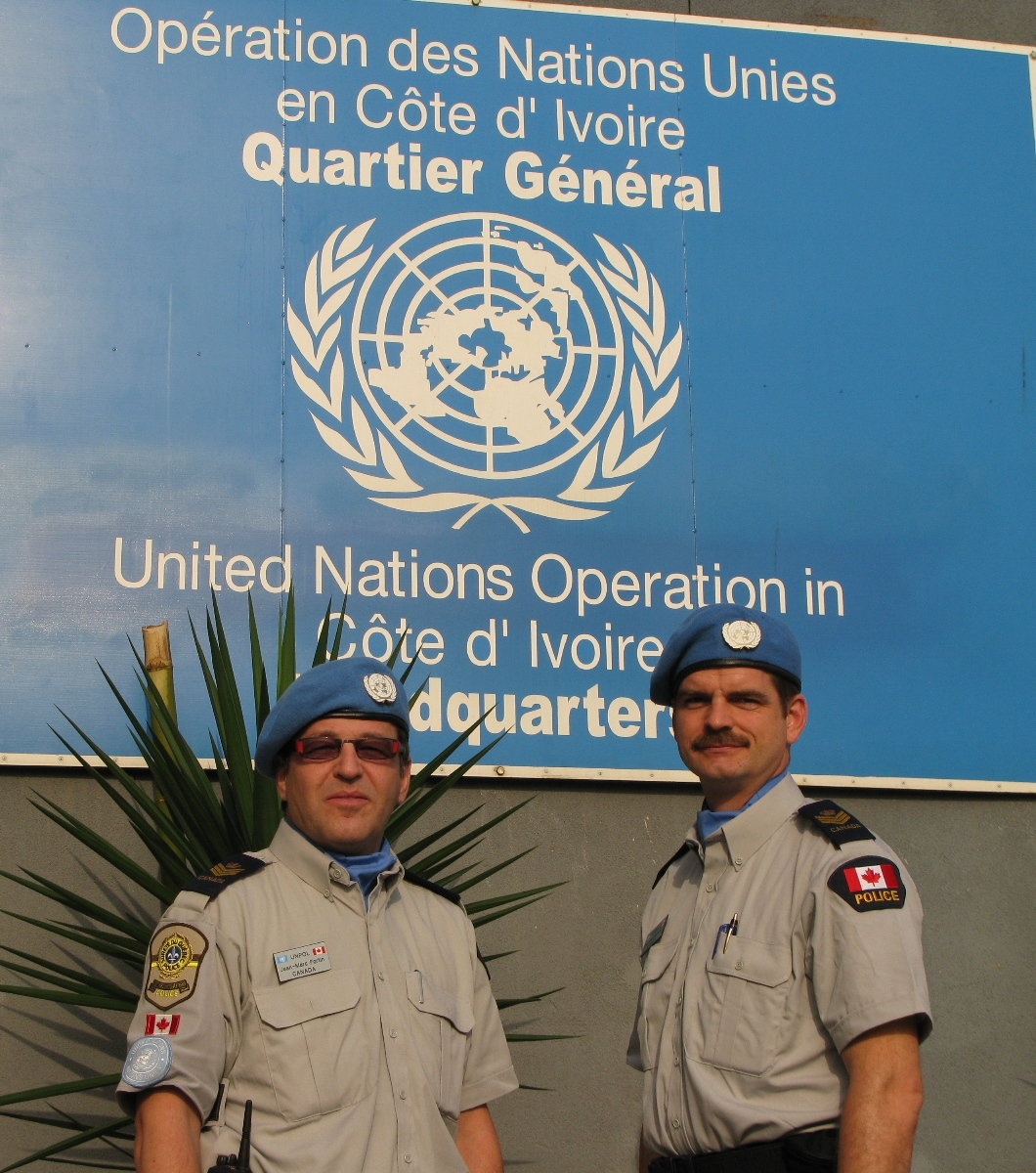
- ONUCI police officers
- Date: 29 September 2010
- Meeting no.: 6,393
- Code: S/RES/1942 (Document)
- Subject: The situation in Côte d'Ivoire
- Voting summary: 15 voted for; None voted against; None abstained
- Result: Adopted

Security Council composition
- Permanent members: China; France; Russia; United Kingdom; United States
- Non-permanent members: Austria; Bosnia–Herzegovina; Brazil; Gabon; Japan; Lebanon; Mexico; Nigeria; Turkey; Uganda

United Nations Security Council Resolution 1942, adopted unanimously on September 29, 2010, after recalling Resolution 1933 (2010) on the situation in Côte d'Ivoire (Ivory Coast), the Council increased the military and police contingents of the United Nations Operation in Côte d'Ivoire (UNOCI).

The Security Council recalled its decision to consider temporarily raising the limit on the number of military and police personnel before and after the elections to a total of no more than 500 additional personnel. The Secretary-General Ban Ki-moon had recommended an increase from 8,650 to 9,150, and that a final voters list was agreed by Ivorian parties on September 6, 2010.

Acting under Chapter VII of the United Nations Charter, the Council authorised an increase of UNOCI military and police personnel by 500, from 8,650 to 9,150, for an immediate deployment for a period of up to six months.

== See also ==
- Ivorian Civil War
- Ivorian parliamentary election, 2010
- Ivorian presidential election, 2010
- List of United Nations Security Council Resolutions 1901 to 2000 (2009–2011)
