= United Nations Security Council Resolution 1609 =

UN Security Council Resolution 1609
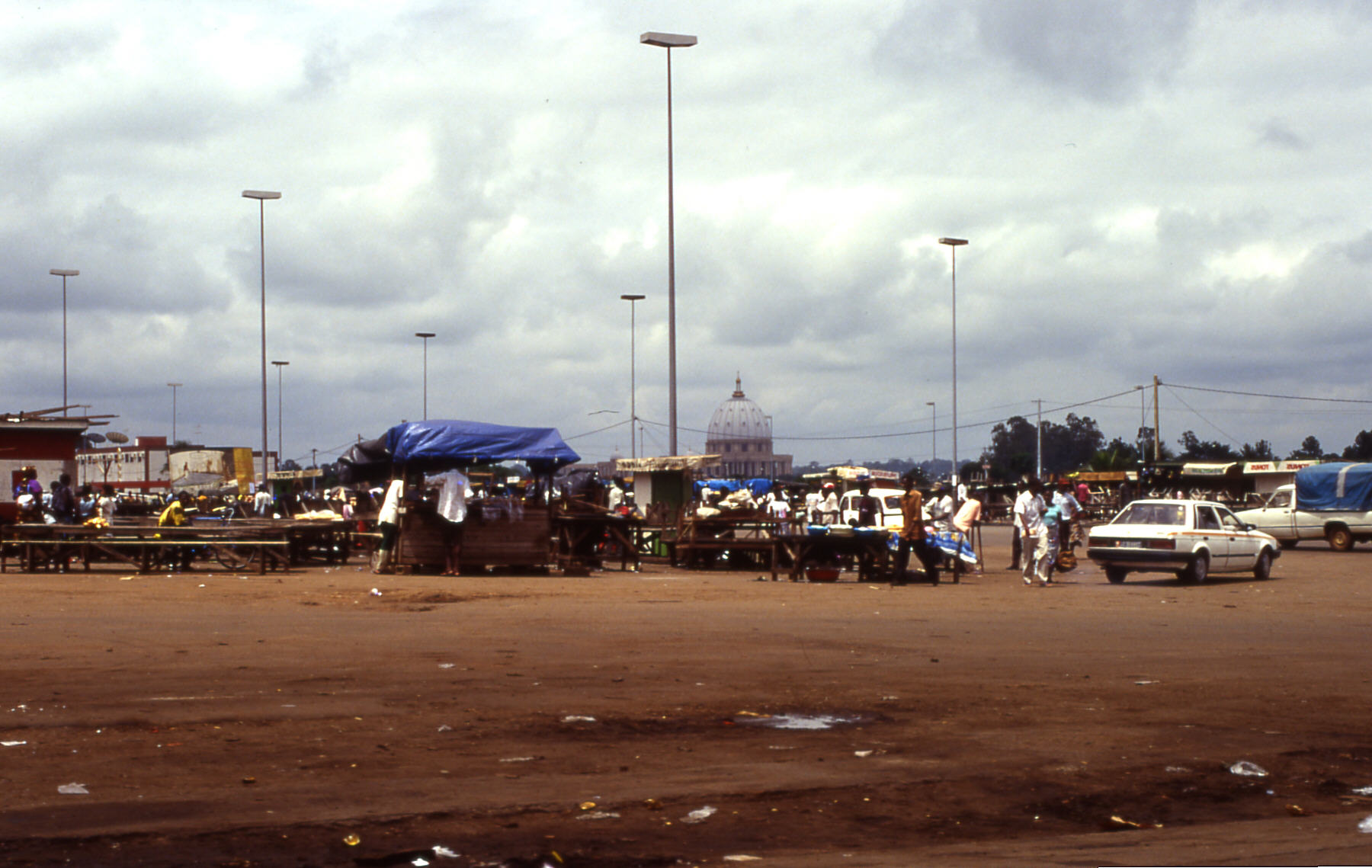
- Yamoussoukro, capital of Côte d'Ivoire
- Date: 24 June 2005
- Meeting no.: 5,213
- Code: S/RES/1609 (Document)
- Subject: The situation in Côte d'Ivoire
- Voting summary: 15 voted for; None voted against; None abstained
- Result: Adopted

Security Council composition
- Permanent members: China; France; Russia; United Kingdom; United States
- Non-permanent members: Algeria; Argentina; Benin; Brazil; Denmark; Greece; Japan; Philippines; Romania; Tanzania

United Nations Security Council Resolution 1609 was adopted unanimously on 24 June 2005. After recalling previous resolutions on the situation in Côte d'Ivoire (Ivory Coast), the council extended the mandate of the United Nations Operation in Côte d'Ivoire (UNOCI) and supporting French forces for a further seven months until 24 January 2006.

== Resolution ==
=== Observations ===
The security council reaffirmed its support for the Linas-Marcoussis Agreement and its full implementation. It commended the African Union, Economic Community of West African States (ECOWAS) and French forces for their efforts to promote a peaceful settlement in Côte d'Ivoire, but noted existing challenges to the stability of the country and its threat to international peace and security in the region, particularly at events in the west of the country.

The council also reviewed a report on cross-border operations between the United Nations Mission in Sierra Leone (UNAMSIL), the United Nations Mission in Liberia (UNMIL) and UNOCI.

=== Acts ===
Acting under Chapter VII of the United Nations Charter, the council extended the mandate of UNOCI and supporting French forces for seven months. UNOCI was given tasks in the following areas:

- Monitoring of the cessation of hostilities and movements of armed groups;
- Disarmament, demobilisation, reintegration, repatriation and resettlement of ex-combatants;
- Disarmament and dismantling of militias;
- Protection of United Nations personnel, institutions and civilians;
- Monitoring of the arms embargo imposed in Resolution 1572 (2004);
- Support for humanitarian assistance;
- Support for the redeployment of State administration;
- Support for the organization of open, free, fair and transparent elections;
- Assistance in the field of human rights, public information and law and order.

The strength of UNOCI was increased by 850 military and 725 police personnel. In addition, the secretary-general was authorised to implement measures contained in his report on inter-mission co-operation and possible cross-border operations. The resolution detailed arrangements for the redeployment of troops among the three peacekeeping operations.

Finally, the council authorised supporting French forces to use any means necessary to support UNOCI.

== See also ==
- Ivorian Civil War
- List of United Nations Security Council Resolutions 1601 to 1700 (2005–2006)
- United Nations Operation in Côte d'Ivoire
