= United Nations Security Council Resolution 1893 =

UN Security Council Resolution 1893
- Date: 29 October 2009
- Meeting no.: 6,209
- Code: S/RES/1893 (Document)
- Subject: The situation in Côte d'Ivoire
- Voting summary: 15 voted for; None voted against; None abstained
- Result: Adopted

Security Council composition
- Permanent members: China; France; Russia; United Kingdom; United States
- Non-permanent members: Austria; Burkina Faso; Costa Rica; Croatia; Japan; Libya; Mexico; Turkey; Uganda; Vietnam

United Nations Security Council Resolution 1893 was unanimously adopted on 29 October 2009.

== Resolution ==
Noting with concern continuing human rights violations against civilians in Côte d'Ivoire, including numerous acts of sexual violence, the Security Council this morning renewed for another year its arms embargo and diamond trade ban in Côte d'Ivoire, as well as targeted sanctions restricting the travel of individuals that threatened the peace process in the West African country.

By the unanimous adoption of resolution 1893 (2009), the Council said it would review those measures, which were due to expire on 31 October, in the light of progress made in the holding of free and fair presidential elections and of other progress achieved in implementing key steps of the Ouagadougou Agreement, which ended the conflict that had divided Côte d'Ivoire between a rebel-held north and Government-controlled south since 2002.

The Council demanded that all Ivorian parties provide unhindered access to the Group of Experts established to monitor the sanctions, and extended the mandate of that Group for another year and requested that Group to include in its reports information on persons who deny it access to weapons, ammunition and related materiel.

The Council reiterated that any threat to the electoral process or any serious obstacle to the freedom of movement of United Nations Operation in Côte d'Ivoire (UNOCI) or the French forces which support it as well as any obstruction to the Secretary-General’s Special Representative or the Facilitator would constitute a threat to the peace and national reconciliation process.

The Council stressed that it was ready to impose targeted measures against persons who are determined to be a threat to the national reconciliation process in Côte d'Ivoire, as well as those threatening human rights there.

== See also ==
- List of United Nations Security Council Resolutions 1801 to 1900 (2008–2009)
