= Second Ivorian Civil War =

Civil War in Ivory Coast from November 2010 to April 2011

- Part of the Ivorian Civil Wars
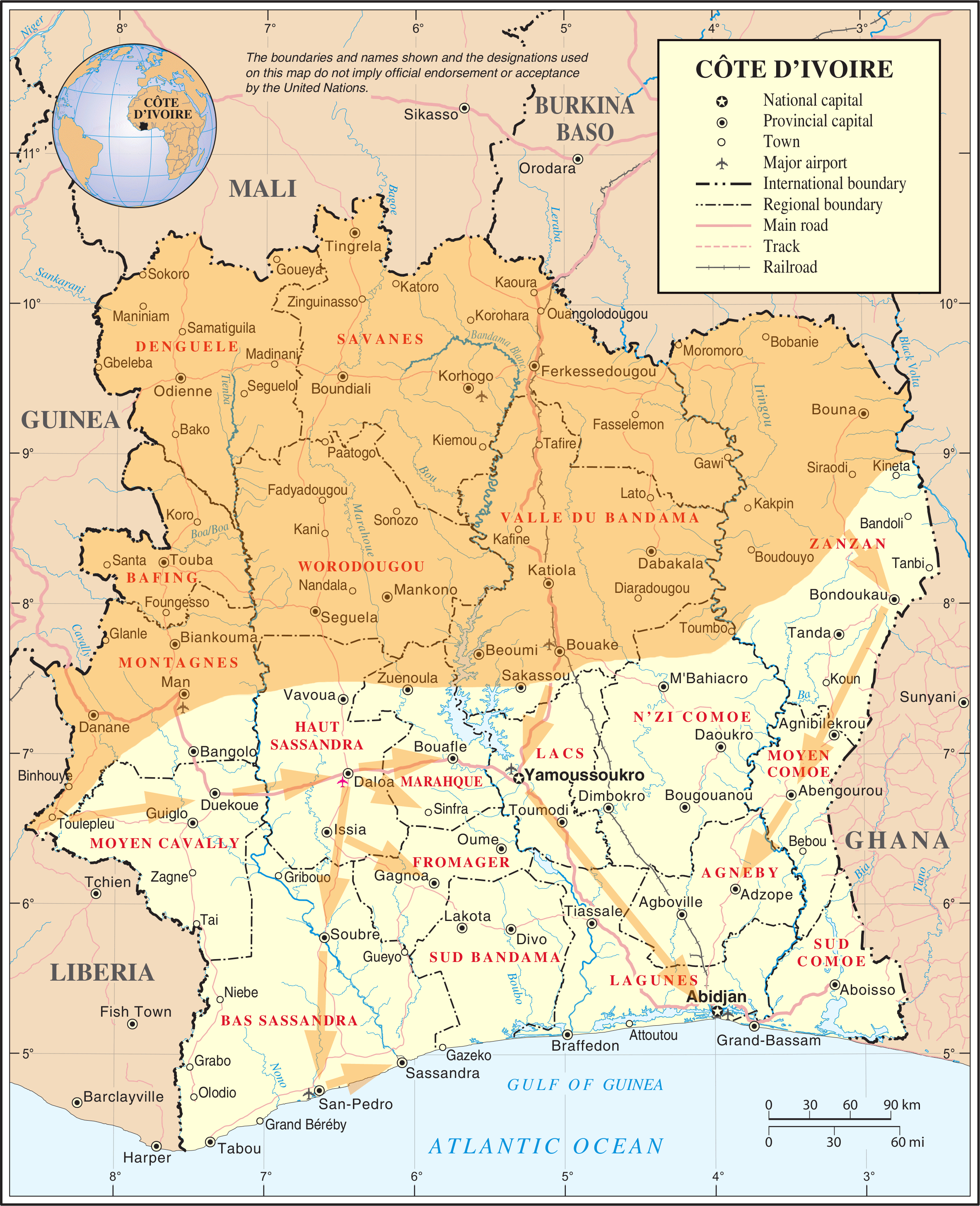
- Map of the March 2011 Republican Forces (RFCI) offensive. Territory held by the RFCI prior to March 2011 is shown in orange.
Date	28 November 2010 – 11 April 2011 (4 months and 2 weeks)
Location	Ivory Coast
Result	Ouattara/UN/French victory: Gbagbo capture

Belligerents
Military of Ivory Coast (Liberia) Liberian mercenaries COJEP; FPI	(Ivory Coast) FNCI (Liberia) Liberian mercenaries (Ivory Coast) RDR (United Nations) UNOCI; France; Ukraine

Commanders and leaders
(Ivory Coast) Laurent Gbagbo (surrendered) (Ivory Coast) Gilbert Aké (Captured after war's end) (Ivory Coast) Michel Amani	(Ivory Coast) Alassane Ouattara (Ivory Coast) Guillaume Soro (Liberia) Benjamin Yeaten (United Nations) (South Korea) Choi Young-jin (France) Nicolas Sarkozy (Ukraine) Viktor Yanukovych

Strength
Unknown	Unknown (New Forces); 10,000 (United Nations)

Casualties and losses
44–61 security forces killed (before March)	50+ killed (RDR); 2 killed (FNCI); 2 killed (UNOCI) (before March)
- 3,000 killed overall

The Second Ivorian Civil War broke out in March 2011 when the crisis in Ivory Coast escalated into full-scale military conflict between forces loyal to Laurent Gbagbo, the President of Ivory Coast since 2000, and supporters of the internationally recognised president-elect Alassane Ouattara.

After months of unsuccessful negotiations and sporadic violence between supporters of the two sides, the crisis entered a critical stage as Ouattara's forces seized control of most of the country with the help of the UN, with Gbagbo entrenched in Abidjan, the country's largest city. International organizations have reported numerous instances of human rights violations by both sides, in particular in the city of Duékoué where Ouattara's forces killed hundreds of people. Around 3,000 people were killed in the conflict. UN and French forces took military action, with the stated objective to protect their forces and civilians. France's forces arrested Gbagbo at his residence on 11 April 2011.

== Background ==
A civil war was fought in Ivory Coast between 2002 and 2004 between the incumbent President Laurent Gbagbo and the rebel Forces Nouvelles de Côte d'Ivoire (New Forces), representing Muslim northerners who felt that they were being discriminated against by the politically dominant and mostly Christian southerners.

In 2002 France sent its troops to Ivory Coast (Opération Licorne) as peacekeepers. In February 2004 the United Nations established the United Nations Operation in Côte d'Ivoire (UNOCI) "to facilitate the implementation by the Ivorian parties of the peace agreement signed by them in January 2003". Most of the fighting ended by late 2004, with the country split between a rebel-held north and a government-held south. In March 2007 the two sides signed an agreement to hold fresh elections, though they ended up being delayed until 2010, five years after Gbagbo's term of office was supposed to have expired.

After northern candidate Alassane Ouattara was declared the victor of the 2010 Ivorian presidential election by the country's Independent Electoral Commission (CEI), the President of the Constitutional Council – an ally of Gbagbo – declared the results to be invalid and that Gbagbo was the winner. Both Gbagbo and Ouattara claimed victory and took the presidential oath of office.

The international community, including the United Nations, the African Union, the Economic Community of West African States (ECOWAS), the European Union, the United States, and former colonial power France affirmed their support for Ouattara, who was "almost universally acknowledged to have defeated [Gbagbo] at the ballot box," and called for Gbagbo to step down. On 18 December, Gbagbo ordered all UN peacekeepers to leave the country. The UN refused and the UN Security Council extended the mandate of the UN Mission in Ivory Coast until 30 June 2011. However, negotiations to resolve the dispute failed to achieve any satisfactory outcome. Hundreds of people were killed in escalating violence between pro-Gbagbo and pro-Ouattara partisans and at least a million people fled, mostly from Abidjan.

== Conflict ==
After the disputed election, sporadic outbreaks of violence took place, particularly in Abidjan, where supporters of Ouattara clashed repeatedly with government forces and militias. Gbagbo's forces were said to be responsible for a campaign of assassinations, beatings and abductions directed against Ouattara's supporters.

The violence escalated through March 2011 with a number of incidents in Abidjan in which dozens of people were reported killed. In one of the deadliest single incidents, up to 30 people were killed on 17 March in a rocket attack on a pro-Ouattara suburb of Abidjan. The UN issued a statement saying that the shelling was "an act, perpetrated against civilians, [that] could constitute a crime against humanity." 52 people were killed in further violence in Abidjan Between 21 and 26 March.

Fighting also broke out in western Ivory Coast at the end of February 2011. On 25 February, the New Forces captured the towns of Zouan Hounien and Binhouye near the border with Liberia and took control of nearby Toulepleu on 7 March. The town of Doké fell on 12 March as the New Forces pushed on towards Bloléquin, which they took on 21 March after heavy fighting.

On 28 March, the New Forces – now renamed the Republican Forces of Côte d'Ivoire (RFCI) – launched a full-scale offensive across the country. Ouattara issued a statement declaring: "All the peaceful routes to lead Laurent Gbagbo to admit his defeat have been exhausted." The towns of Duékoué and Daloa in the west of the country were captured by the RFCI, as were Bondoukou and Abengourou near the border with Ghana in the east. On 30 March, Ivory Coast's political capital Yamoussoukro and the western town of Soubré were taken without resistance. The port city of San Pédro, the world's largest cocoa exporting port, fell to the RFCI in the early hours of 31 March as did the nearby coastal town of Sassandra. On the same day Ivory Coast's borders with neighbouring countries were ordered to be sealed by Ouattara's forces.

On 30 March United Nations Security Council Resolution 1975 was issued which, in particular, urged all Ivorian parties to respect the will of the people and the election of Alassane Ouattara as President of Ivory Coast, as recognised by ECOWAS, the African Union and the rest of the international community and reiterated that UNOCI could use "all necessary measures" in its mandate to protect civilians under imminent threat of attack.

The fighting was reported to have caused heavy damage in some contested towns, from which the inhabitants were said to have fled en masse. Large numbers of people were said to have found dead after Ouattara's forces took control of the central Ivorian towns; in Duékoué alone, over 800 people were reported to have been killed, according to the International Committee of the Red Cross, though responsibility for the massacres was unclear. Ouattara's government stated that numerous mass graves had been found in "Toulepleu, Bloléquin and Guiglo, whose authors are none other than the loyal forces, mercenaries and militias of Laurent Gbagbo." However, the United Nations blamed the RFCI for many of the deaths.

=== Battle of Abidjan ===
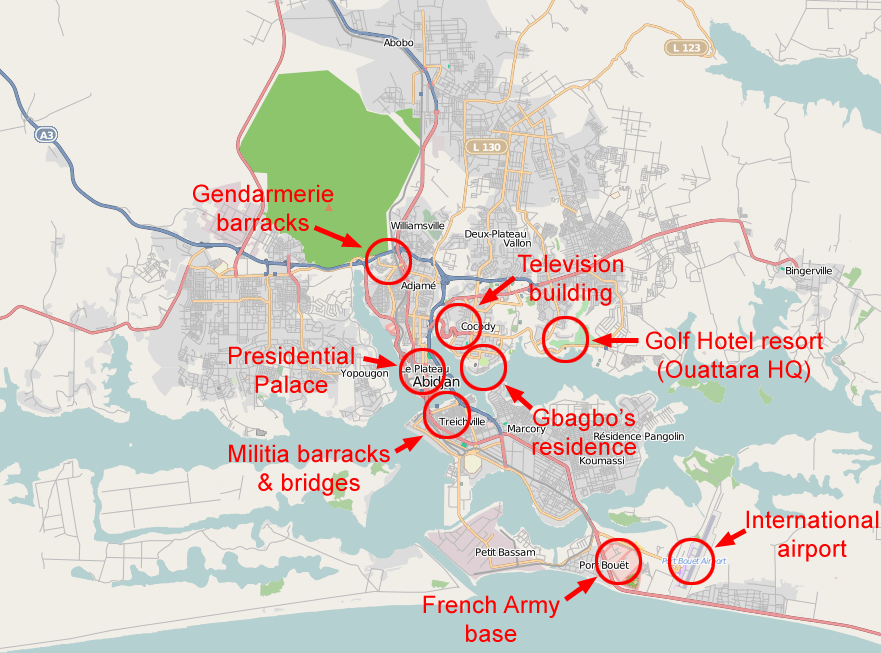
Map of Abidjan, the commercial capital of Ivory Coast, with key locations marked

In Abidjan, heavy fighting broke out on 31 March as pro-Ouattara forces advanced on the city from several directions. Residents reported seeing the RFCI forces entering the city in "a convoy of 2,000–3,000 people on foot and then dozens of cars without their headlights on." Ouattara declared a three-day curfew in Abidjan from 2100 GMT to 0600 GMT.

The United Nations peacekeepers took control of Abidjan's airport when Gbagbo's forces abandoned it, and Gbagbo's elite forces were reported to be surrounding the presidential residence. United Nations and French forces were also reported to be carrying out protective security operations in the city. The UN peacekeeping mission said its headquarters were fired on by Gbagbo's special forces on 31 March, and returned fire in an exchange lasting about three hours. UN convoys have also come under attack by Gbagbo loyalists four times since 31 March, with three peacekeepers injured in one of the attacks. The peacekeepers had exchanged fire with Gbagbo loyalists in several parts of the city. Around 500 foreign nationals took refuge at the French base at Port-Bouët, near the airport.

Ouattara appealed to Gbagbo's men to lay down their arms, promising that Gbagbo himself would come to no harm, and issued a statement: "There is still time to join your brothers. The country is calling you." Many of them defected or gave up without a fight, including the army chief of staff General Phillippe Mangou, who took refuge in the South African ambassador's house, and the head of the military police, General Tiape Kassarate, who defected to Ouattara's side. Despite belligerent language from Gbagbo's side, most of his forces appear to have decided not to fight – a decision attributed by some commentators to "the historically unwarrior-like nature of the Ivorian army" and the effect of sanctions on Gbagbo's ability to pay his forces. Military sources said that an estimated 50,000 members of the gendarmerie and armed forces had deserted, with only some 2,000 Gbagbo loyalists remaining behind to fight.

The fighting in Abidjan has been concentrated in two areas in the suburb of Cocody – around the state television building, which went off the air on the evening of 31 March, and around the residence of Laurent Gbagbo, where pro-Gbagbo Republican Guard members and armed students were said to be putting up strong resistance. Gunfire and shelling was also reported around the presidential palace in the central Plateau district of the city. Fighting also broke out in the Treichville district, where Gbagbo's Republican Guard was defending the city's main bridges, and around the gendarmerie base at Agban.

On 2 April heavy fighting was around the Agban military base and the presidential palace. State television station RTI appeared to be back under the control of Gbagbo supporters after being briefly taken off air. Many residents of Abidjan reported that supplies of food were becoming limited, with the violence making it dangerous to leave buildings to buy more.

Also on 2 April, UN Secretary General Ban Ki-moon told the BBC that "[a]t this time, I strongly urge Mr Gbagbo to step down and transfer power to the legitimately elected president... Mr Ouattara."

On 4 April, non-military United Nations personnel began to be evacuated from Abidjan and hundreds of additional French troops landed in the Abidjan airport. UN and French helicopters also began firing on pro-Gbagbo military installations, a French military spokesman said the attacks were aimed at heavy artillery and armoured vehicles. Eyewitnesses reported seeing two UN Mi-24P attack helicopters firing missiles at the Akouédo military camp in Abidjan. UN helicopters were flown by Ukrainian Ground Forces crews seconded to the United Nations. The attacks sparked protests by a Gbagbo spokesperson, who said that such actions were "illegal, illegitimate and unacceptable." UN Secretary-General Ban Ki-moon defended the actions, however, saying that "the [UN] mission has taken this action in self-defence and to protect civilians." He noted that Gbagbo's forces had fired on United Nations patrols and attacked the organization's headquarters in Abidjan "with heavy-caliber sniper fire as well as mortars and rocket-propelled grenades", wounding four peacekeepers.

On 4 April General Phillippe Mangou left the South African ambassador's residence in Abidjan and rejoined the government forces. On Ouattara's TV station, Serges Alla, a journalist claimed: "Mangou was forced to leave the South African embassy because some of his relatives were made hostage by diehard supporters of Gbagbo, and Gbagbo militiamen were putting pressure on him, saying they would bomb his village if he doesn't show himself or doesn't return to the Gbagbo army."

Early on 5 April 2011, Ouattara forces announced that they had captured the presidential palace. The same day General Philippe Mangou, the military chief of Laurent Gbagbo, called for a ceasefire.

Following calls for ceasefire by Gbagbo's military officials, it was reported that fighting has ceased in Abidjan. Special UN representative Choi Young-jin stated that all Gbagbo's top generals had defected and that "the war is over". Gbagbo had been negotiating a surrender; French Foreign Minister Alain Juppe said that they were close to convincing Gbagbo to leave power. The ECOWAS bloc promised a "safe and dignified exit" for Gbagbo and his family if he conceded the election, handing power over to Ouattara. However, forces loyal to Ouattara moved to seize Gbagbo at his residence in Abidjan on 6 April 2011, after the negotiations failed.

French forces were said to have destroyed several military vehicles belonging to troops loyal to Laurent Gbagbo during a helicopter-borne mission that rescued Japan's ambassador, Yoshifumi Okamura, during heavy fighting in Abidjan during the morning of 7 April.

On 8 April pro-Ouattara forces continued to besiege Gbagbo in his residence. Ouattara said a blockade had been set up around the perimeter to make the district safe for residents. He said his forces would wait for Gbagbo to run out of food and water. However, Paris-based adviser Toussaint Alain to Gbagbo said that Gbagbo would not surrender. Also on this day, Gbagbo forces using heavy weaponry such as rockets, grenade launchers and tanks were reported to have resumed fighting in Abidjan, taking control of the Plateau and Cocody areas of the city.

On 9 April, pro-Gbagbo forces were reported to have fired on the Golf Hotel, where Ouattara was located. The attackers reportedly used both sniper rifles and mortars; in response, UN peacekeepers fired on them. Gbagbo's forces were reported to have pushed Ouattara's forces back, retaking control of the Plateau and Cocody districts of Abidjan.

The following day, United Nations and French forces carried out further air strikes against Gbagbo's remaining heavy weapons, using Mi-24 and Aérospatiale Gazelle attack helicopters. The attack was reported to have caused heavy damage to the presidential palace.

=== Arrest of Gbagbo ===
On 11 April, Ouattara's forces stormed Gbagbo's residence and arrested him. The final assault was assisted by French forces using helicopters and armoured vehicles, although the actual capture was made by Ouattara's troops. There have been persistent rumors that French special forces blew up a wall blocking a tunnel between the French Embassy and Gbagbo's residence in Abidjan; Ivorian forces loyal to Ouattara then rushed through the tunnel into the house and arrest him. Gbagbo, his wife, son and about 50 members of his entourage were captured unharmed and were taken to the Golf Hotel, Ouattara's headquarters, where they were placed under United Nations guard.

== Killing of civilians ==
=== Duékoué massacre ===
Unknown attackers wielding machetes and various guns were reported to have killed over 1,000 civilians in a neighbourhood of the town of Duékoué, which was largely controlled by forces fighting to install the internationally recognized president according to the Catholic charity Caritas. The U.N. mission in Ivory Coast said it has a team investigating the alleged mass killings in the west of the town. The U.N. said forces of both Ouattara and Gbagbo were involved in the killings. On the 4th Caritas repeated its claims that 800 to 1,000 had been killed in the Duékoué massacre. The nation's general descent into violence had frightened both the foreigners and Caritas aid workers.

According to Guillaume N'Gefa, spokesman for the UN mission in Ivory Coast, 330 people had been killed in Duékoué as Ouattara's forces took over the town, More than 100 of them were killed by Gbagbo's troops. However, N'Gefa said the majority were executed by dozos, traditional hunters who support Ouattara.

N'Gefa said a UN team was still investigating and those figures were likely to rise. Earlier the International Committee of the Red Cross (ICRC) said at least 800 died, while Caritas put the figure at more than 1,000. ICRC staff who visited Duékoué said the scale and brutality of the killings were shocking. Tens of thousands had fled Duékoué since 28 March.

On 7 April Rupert Colville, spokesman for the UN High Commissioner for Human Rights, said its team had found 15 new bodies, bringing the total number of known dead in a 28–29 March incident to 244. Victims mostly or all of Guere ethnicity, traditional Gbagbo supporters. Some seem to have been burnt alive and some corpses were thrown down a well.

In addition to the issue of the presidency, the root cause of the massacre was believed to be over cocoa land and farming rights. The Guere are the traditional land-owners of the region; but migrant workers perform much of the manual labor on cocoa plantations. The two have a historic dispute over the rights to the farmland.

=== Blolequin and Guiglo massacres ===
On 7 April Rupert Colville said that 40 bodies were found in Blolequin, where perpetrators were said to have been Liberian militias, who spared the Guere after separating them out from other groups. In Guiglo 60 bodies were found, including a number of West Africans.

== International reaction ==
- On 8 March, Leymah Gbowee issued a statement of support for the peaceful protests of the Christian and Muslim women in the Ivory Coast and compared them to the women of Liberia.
- Nigerian Foreign Minister Henry Odein Ajumogobia accused the international community of "contradictions" by imposing a no-fly zone over Libya and focusing on the 2011 Libyan civil war, but failing to take action to protect civilians in the Ivory Coast.
- On 23 March, at the ECOWAS Summit, Goodluck Jonathan, President of Nigeria urged the United Nations to pass a resolution to take decisive action, saying instability posed a threat to security in West Africa.
- On 23 March, the "One Thousand Women March" was organized by peace activists in West Africa. They wore white T-shirts and represented countries across West Africa including Ivory Coast, Ghana, Liberia, Nigeria, Sierra Leone and Togo. They issued a press release and presented a position statement to the ECOWAS Heads of State.
- On 30 March, the United Nations Security Council Resolution 1975 was adopted unanimously, demanding that Laurent Gbagbo step down as president and allow internationally recognised President Alassane Ouattara to take power. The resolution imposed sanctions on Gbagbo and his close associates. The resolution was sponsored by France and Nigeria.
- Ivory Coast received more attention and obtained more consensus by the United Nations Security Council than any other country from 2009 to 2011.

=== Criticism ===
- Russian Foreign Minister Sergei Lavrov said that Russia intended to look into the legitimacy of the use of force by UN peacekeepers. The position of the Russian government was that any foreign interference would only lead to increasing violence.

== Refugees ==
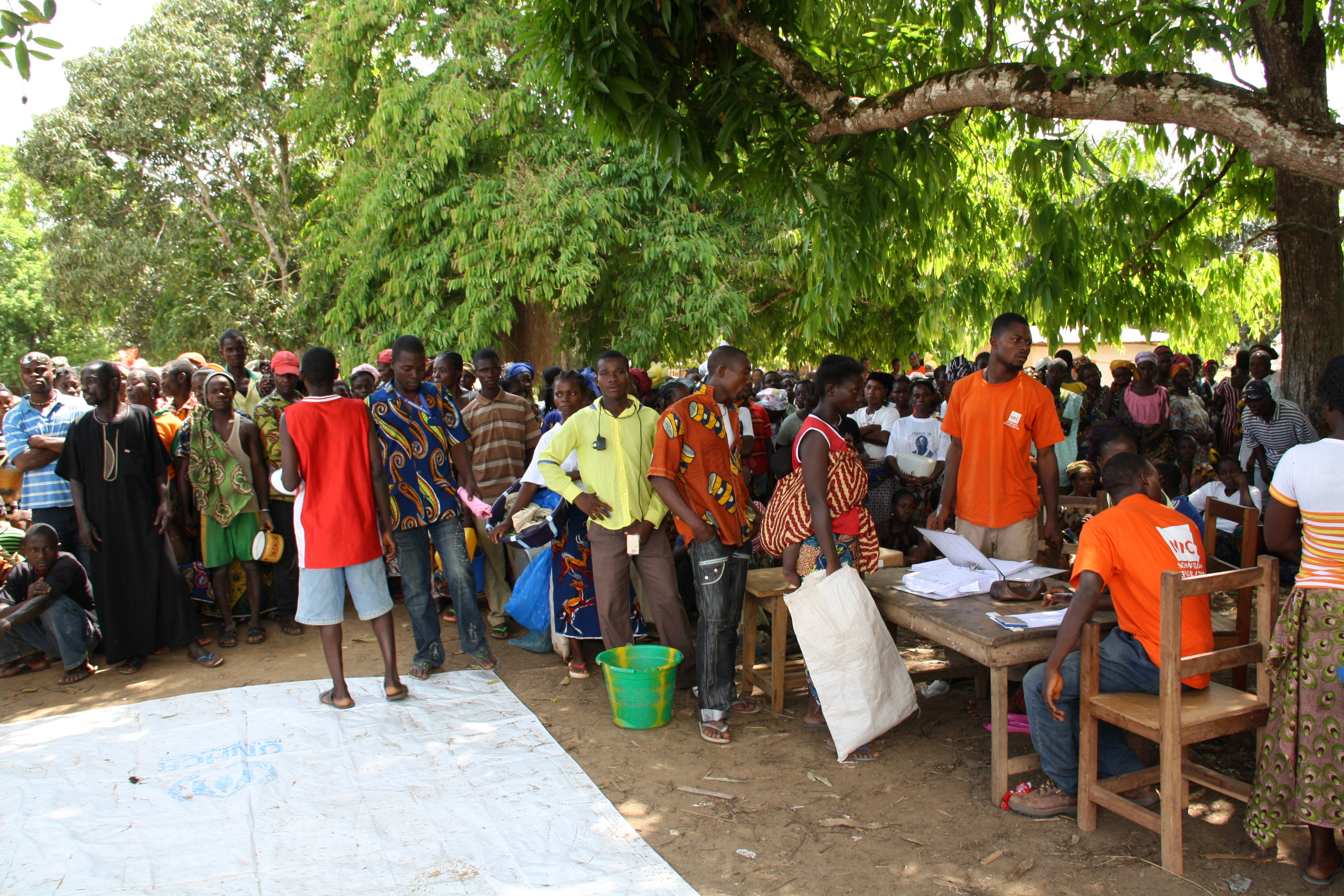
Displaced Ivorians queue for food at a UNHCR distribution site in Liberia

According to the United Nations, due to the continuing violence more than 100,000 people fled the country to neighbouring Liberia. At Old Pohan, a Liberian settlement next to the thickets that extend to the border, refugees greatly outnumbered the local population, and more were arriving all the time. President of Liberia Ellen Johnson Sirleaf said in an interview that "it’s a serious threat to the stability of Liberia and, I might say, to the stability of all neighboring countries". Seeking to move the Ivorians away from border settlements, the United Nations has opened a camp about 25 miles inside Liberia. Refugees are also starting to cross in significant numbers into Ghana.

According to UK shadow international development minister Mark Lazarowicz, the UN aid programmes for Ivory Coast and Liberia are "grossly underfunded".

Although many thousands of Ivorians remain in Liberia, convoys of Ivorian refugees – each convoy containing a few hundred people – have begun heading home, frequently finding their communities still in tatters from the conflict. Ivorian officials have blamed deadly attacks launched from Liberia that targeted Ivorian border towns in 2012 on former militia fighters that remain loyal to Gbagbo and now live in refugee camps in Liberia.

In addition to refugees in Liberia, a significant number of displaced Ivorians stayed in camps throughout western Ivory Coast. The largest was in the Catholic Mission in Duékoué, where at one point church officials estimated 28,000 displaced were staying each night. The displaced persons ultimately were relocated from the Catholic Mission to the Nahibly camp on the outskirts of Duékoué. The camp was burned down by attackers in July 2012, killing 7 and chasing about 5,000 people from their temporary homes.

== Mercenaries ==
General Gueu Michel, the commander of Ouattara's forces in western Ivory Coast, said that Liberian mercenaries were fighting on the side of Laurent Gbagbo. Liberian and United Nations officials said the general was correct to suspect Liberian mercenaries of crossing into Ivory Coast to help Gbagbo stay in power. Harrison S. Karnwea Sr., Liberia's interior minister said, however, that both sides were recruiting Liberian mercenaries.

== Impact on foreign nationals ==
By 2 April 1,400 French and other foreign nationals (900 of whom were Lebanese citizens) entered the French peacekeepers' camp close to the Abidjan Airport. The Lebanese president, U.N. officials and French commanders provided assistance to facilitate the departure of the Lebanese, French and African nationals who wish to leave the Ivory Coast. The French army formally took over the running of Abidjan airport on the 4th in order to evacuate foreign citizens living in the Ivory Coast. Evacuations took place on the 5th and 6th.

== Fiscal effects ==
Ivory Coast's now defaulted $2,300,000,000 debt bond rose 1.2 points on the 6th to a new four-month high, a possible sign of increased investor confidence that Ouattara would take office and resume payments.

== See also ==
- Impact of the Arab Spring

== Bibliography ==
- Themnér, Anders (2015). "Former Military Networks and the Micro-Politics of Violence and Statebuilding in Liberia". Comparative Politics. 47 (1). New York City: Graduate Center, CUNY: 334–353. doi:10.5129/001041515814709284.
