= United Nations Mission in Liberia =

Peacekeeping operation in West Africa

- Abbreviation: UNMIL
- Formation: 19 September 2003
- Type: Peacekeeping Mission
- Legal status: Mandate is completed on 30.03.2018
- Headquarters: Monrovia, Liberia
- Head: Farid Zarif
- Parent organization: United Nations Security Council
- Website: unmil.unmissions.org

The United Nations Mission in Liberia (UNMIL) was a United Nations peacekeeping operation established in September 2003 to monitor a ceasefire agreement in Liberia following the resignation of President Charles Taylor and the conclusion of the Second Liberian Civil War (1999–2003). At its peak it consisted of up to 15,000 UN military personnel and 1,115 police officers, along with civilian political advisors and aid workers.

UNMIL superseded the United Nations Observer Mission in Liberia (UNOMIL), which had been established in 1993 to support the peacekeeping efforts of the Economic Community of West African States (ECOWAS) during the First Liberian Civil War (1989–1996). Two years of relative peace ended with another civil war, triggered by conflict between rebel groups and Taylor's administration. Large scale fighting ended following the Accra Peace Agreement in August 2003, and UNMIL was subsequently formed to implement the terms of the agreement and help establish a new transitional government.

Through a unanimous resolution of the UN Security Council (UNSC), UNMIL was initially given a one-year mandate that included providing security, protecting UN personnel and facilities, supporting humanitarian assistance, promoting security reform, and implementing the peace process, which included elections in 2005. The mission would be regularly extended for another fifteen years, during which it successfully facilitated two free and fair elections, maintained security, and helped rebuild infrastructure and political institutions, often in close cooperation with local civil society groups.

In light of the improving political and security situation, in 2015, the UNSC resolved to gradually wind down UNMIL in preparation for the Liberian government to take full responsibility for peace and security. By June 2016, UNMIL's mandate was officially transferred to local authorities, with the force reduced to 1,240 U.N. military and 606 police personnel only in case of emergency; the peacekeeping mission formally withdrew on 30 March 2018. By that time, a total of 126,000 military, 16,000 police and 23,000 civilian staff had been deployed as part of the operation.

UNMIL is largely considered to have been effective, credited with restoring long-lasting democracy, political stability, and rule of law in Liberia. Though marred by some controversies, including instances of abuse and transactional sex engaged by some peacekeepers, the mission's overall result has been described as one of the U.N.'s biggest achievements.

== Background ==
Civil war in Liberia claimed the lives of more than 150,000 people - mostly civilians - and led to a complete breakdown of law and order. It displaced tens of thousands of people, both internally and beyond the borders, resulting in some 850,000 refugees in the neighboring countries. Fighting began in late 1989, and by early 1990, several hundred deaths had already occurred in confrontations between government forces and fighters who claimed membership in an opposition group, the National Patriotic Front of Liberia (NPFL), led by a former government official, Mr. Charles Taylor.

From the outset of the conflict, a subregional organization, the Economic Community of West African States (ECOWAS), undertook various initiatives aimed at a peaceful settlement. The United Nations supported ECOWAS in its efforts to end a civil war. These efforts included establishing, in 1990, an ECOWAS's military observer force, the Military Observer Group (ECOMOG). The Security Council in 1992 imposed an arms embargo on Liberia, and the Secretary-General appointed a Special Representative to assist in talks between ECOWAS and the warring parties.

After ECOWAS brokered a peace agreement in Cotonou, Benin, in 1993, the Security Council established the United Nations Observer Mission in Liberia (UNOMIL) under Security Council Resolution 866. Its task was to support ECOMOG in implementing the Cotonou peace agreement - especially compliance with and impartial implementation of the agreement by all parties. UNOMIL was the first United Nations peacekeeping mission undertaken in cooperation with a peacekeeping operation already established by another organization.

Delays in the implementation of the peace agreement and resumed fighting among Liberian factions made it impossible to hold elections in February/March 1994, as scheduled. In the following months, a number of supplementary peace agreements, amending and clarifying the Cotonou agreement, were negotiated. With the ceasefire in force, the United Nations successfully observed the conduct of the elections in July 1997. Mr. Charles Taylor was elected president. Following his inauguration on 2 August 1997, President Taylor formed a new Government and announced a policy of reconciliation and national unity. UNOMIL's principal objective was achieved.

However, the Second Liberian Civil War began in 1999 when a rebel group backed by the government of neighboring Guinea, the Liberians United for Reconciliation and Democracy (LURD), emerged in northern Liberia. In early 2003, a second rebel group, the Movement for Democracy in Liberia, emerged in the south, and by June–July 2003, Charles Taylor's government controlled only a third of the country. The capital Monrovia was besieged by LURD, and that group's shelling of the city resulted in the deaths of many civilians. Thousands of people were displaced from their homes as a result of the conflict.

== UNOL (1997–2003) ==
In November 1997, following the completion of UNOMIL's mandate on 30 September, the United Nations established the United Nations Peace-building Support Office in Liberia (UNOL), headed by a Representative of the Secretary-General. That first United Nations post-conflict peace-building support office was tasked primarily with assisting the Government in consolidating peace following the July 1997 multiparty elections.

With the full support of the Security Council, UNOL facilitated the promotion of national reconciliation and good governance and helped mobilize international support for the implementation of reconstruction and development programmes.

However, the peace-building efforts of UNOL were seriously hindered by the inability of the Government and opposition party leaders to resolve their political differences. Meanwhile, the promotion of national reconciliation was undermined by systematic abuses of human rights, the exclusion and harassment of political opponents and the absence of security sector reform. These elements contributed to the resumption of civil war in Liberia, prompting the international community to call on the warring parties to seek a negotiated settlement of the conflict.

On 8 July 2003, as fighting between Government forces and various warring factions intensified and humanitarian tragedy threatened, the Secretary-General decided (S/2003/695) to appoint Jacques Paul Klein of the United States his Special Representative for Liberia. He was entrusted with the task of coordinating the activities of the United Nations agencies in Liberia and supporting the emerging transitional arrangements. On 29 July, the Secretary-General outlined (S/2003/769) a three-phased deployment of international troops to Liberia, leading to a multidimensional United Nations peacekeeping operation. He also indicated that, in view of the appointment of Mr. Klein, and the envisaged establishment of a United Nations operation in Liberia, the mandate of UNOL would naturally have to be terminated.

== Resolution 1497 (2003) ==
On 1 August 2003, the Security Council adopted Resolution 1497 (2003), authorizing the establishment of a multinational force in Liberia and declaring its readiness to establish a follow-on United Nations stabilization force to be deployed no later than 1 October 2003. On 18 August 2003, the Liberian parties signed a Comprehensive Peace Agreement in Accra. By that Agreement, the parties requested the United Nations to deploy a force to Liberia under Chapter VII of the Charter of the United Nations to support the National Transitional Government of Liberia and assist in the implementation of the Agreement. With the subsequent deployment of the ECOWAS Mission in Liberia, the security situation in the country improved.

== Recommendation for the establishment of a UN peacekeeping mission ==
As requested by the Security Council, the Secretary-General submitted on 11 September a report (S/2003/875) providing an update on the situation in the country, and containing his recommendations on the role the United Nations could play to facilitate the effective implementation of the Comprehensive Peace Agreement, as well as on the size, structure and mandate of a peacekeeping operation in Liberia.

The Secretary-General recommended that the Council, acting under Chapter VII of the United Nations Charter, authorize the deployment of a United Nations peacekeeping operation with a troop strength of up to 15,000, including 250 military observers, 160 staff officers, up to 875 civilian police officers and an additional five armed formed units each comprising 120 officers, and a significant civilian component and necessary support staff.

He said that the United Nations Mission in Liberia (UNMIL) would be a multidimensional operation composed of political, military, civilian police, criminal justice, civil affairs, human rights, gender, child protection, disarmament, demobilization and reintegration, public information and support components, as well as an electoral component in due course. The Mission would include a mechanism for the coordination of its activities with those of the humanitarian and development community. UNMIL would coordinate closely with ECOWAS and the African Union. In order to ensure a coordinated United Nations response to the many subregional issues, UNMIL would also work closely with the United Nations Mission in Sierra Leone (UNAMSIL), the United Nations Operation in Côte d'Ivoire (UNOCI) and the United Nations Office for West Africa (UNOWA).

The Mission would be headed by the Special Representative of the Secretary-General, who would have overall authority for the activities of the Mission and of the United Nations system in Liberia. The Special Representative would be assisted by a senior management team consisting of, among others, two Deputies, a Force Commander with the rank of Lieutenant General, and a Police Commissioner.

A senior gender adviser, with staff, would be part of the Office of the Special Representative of the Secretary-General to undertake and support gender mainstreaming within the various pillars of the Office and with civil society and other external partners. An HIV/AIDS policy adviser, with supporting staff, would also be attached to the Office of the Special Representative, to coordinate activities in the Mission area for the prevention of HIV transmission among civilian and military personnel and host communities.

The Secretary-General proposed that the mandate of UNMIL would be to support the National Transitional Government of Liberia and the other parties in the effective and timely implementation of the Comprehensive Peace Agreement; to monitor adherence to the ceasefire agreement of June 17, 2003; to assist the National Transitional Government in extending State authority throughout Liberia; to provide security at key government installations, in particular, ports, airports and other vital infrastructure; to ensure the security and freedom of movement of United Nations personnel; to facilitate the free movement of people, humanitarian assistance and goods; to support the safe and sustainable return of refugees and internally displaced persons; and to protect civilians under imminent threat of physical violence in the areas of immediate deployment of United Nations formed military units.

In addition, the force would advise, train and assist the Liberian law enforcement authorities and other criminal justice institutions; assist the National Transitional Government in the implementation of a disarmament, demobilization and reintegration programme; guard weapons, ammunition and other military equipment collected from ex-combatants and assist in their subsequent disposal or destruction; assist in the preparation of elections; monitor and report on the human rights situation and provide training and capacity-building in the field of human rights and child protection; provide support for gender mainstreaming, including training; support the establishment and operations of the Truth and Reconciliation Commission; and cooperate with ECOWAS, the African Union and the United Nations on cross-cutting political and security issues.

In his report the Secretary-General observed that the transfer of power from President Charles Taylor to Vice-President Moses Blah and the signing of the Comprehensive Peace Agreement by the Liberian parties offered a unique window of opportunity to end the suffering inflicted on the people of Liberia and to find a peaceful solution to a conflict that had been the centre of instability in the subregion. While the United Nations and the international community at large stood ready to support the Liberian peace process, the effective and successful implementation of the Peace Agreement remained the primary responsibility of the Liberian parties themselves, he stressed.

== Establishment of UNMIL ==
In September 2003, the Security Council welcomed the Secretary-General's report of 11 September 2003 and its recommendations and unanimously adopted Resolution 1509 establishing UNMIL with up to 15,000 United Nations military personnel, including up to 250 military observers and 160 staff officers, and up to 1,115 civilian police officers, including formed units to assist in the maintenance of law and order throughout Liberia, and the appropriate civilian component.

The Council requested the Secretary-General to transfer authority to UNMIL on 1 October from forces led by ECOWAS, which it commended for its rapid and professional deployment. Among other things, the Council also took note of the intention of the Secretary-General to terminate the mandate of UNOL and to transfer the major functions performed by that Office to UNMIL.

As scheduled, UNMIL took over peacekeeping duties from ECOWAS forces on October 1, 2003. Lieutenant General Daniel Opande of Kenya was appointed Force Commander. Some 3,500 West African troops who had been serving with ECOMIL vanguard force were provisionally "re-hatted" as United Nations peacekeepers. In a statement issued on that day, the Secretary-General welcomed this very important development and saluted ECOWAS for its role in establishing the security climate that paved the way for the deployment of UNMIL. He commended the Governments of Benin, Gambia, Ghana, Guinea-Bissau, Mali, Nigeria, Senegal and Togo who have contributed to UNMIL, as well as the United States for its support to the regional force. The Commander of Nigerian contingent Brigadier-General Ebiowei Awala proclaimed that Nigeria had contributed 21,160 troops to UNMIL mission between 2003 and 2009. The Secretary-General expressed confidence that UNMIL would be able to contribute in a major way towards the resolution of conflict in Liberia, provided all parties concerned cooperate fully with the force and the international community provides the necessary resources.

Since 2009, the mandate has been extended annually. The most recent extension of the mandate happened when the UN Security Council on 22 December 2016 extended the mandate to 30 March 2018.

In 2018, through the Deputy Secretary General for the Rule of Law, Waldemar Wray's office, the UNMIL has "provided textbooks, furniture, and equipment" to establish a human right library at the Ashmun Street Headquarter of the Liberia National Bar Association (LNBA). Wray stated that the library "is meant to primarily enhance the human right's knowledge of members of the bar" giving the lawyers the needed resources to aid in their ability to "protect the interests of their clients.

== Peacekeeping Force ==
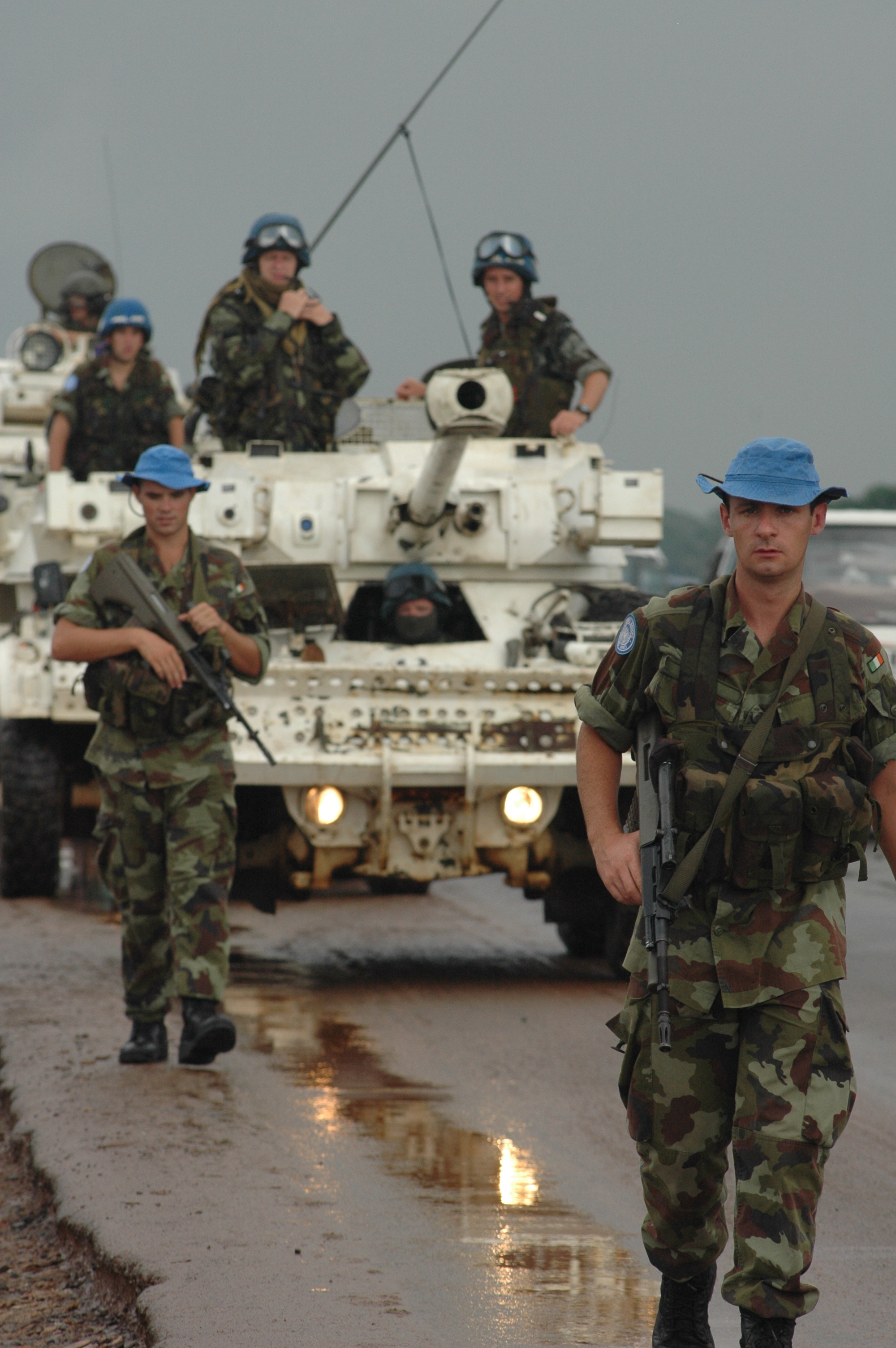
Irish UNMIL troops on patrol with Panhard AML-90 armoured vehicles, July 2006.

The peacekeeping force in Liberia used to encompass four brigade sized formations, plus the force headquarters. Each formation is responsible for one of four sectors that the country has been divided into; each sector contains a full range of combat units, engineering and medical support.

The force listing given below dates from before the reduction in force strength carried out in 2007-09; there are now two sectors, A covering former Sectors 1 and 2 and based at Bushrod Island, Monrovia, and B covering Sectors 3 and 4 and apparently based at Gbarnga.

In December 2012, Major General Leonard Ngondi of the Kenya Defence Forces was appointed as Force Commander. Force commander as of December 2015 is Major General Salihu Zaway Uba of Nigeria. General Luka Yusuf of Nigeria served as commander of Sector 1, before becoming Command Officer-in-Charge of the new Armed Forces of Liberia as a Major General in March 2006. From 2012 to 2013, United States Army Brigadier General Hugh Van Roosen, commanded the mission, the first for an American since 1996 in Bosnia.

=== Force HQ ===
- Pakistan Army Mechanized Infantry Battalion
- Infantry Battalion (Pakistan)
- Mechanized Infantry Company (Sweden) (Rapid Reaction Force)
- Mechanized Infantry Company (Ireland) (Rapid Reaction Force)
- Infantry Company (Nigeria)
- Engineering Company (Bangladesh)
- Engineering Company (Pakistan)
- Engineering Company (Pakistan)
- Transport Company (China)
- Military Police Company (Nepal)
- Hospital (Jordan) (sharing facilities with John F. Kennedy Hospital in Monrovia)
- 56th Helicopter Company (Armed Forces of Ukraine)
- Philippine Contingent (Clerical and VIP Security)

=== Sector 1 ===
- 2 x Infantry Battalion (Pakistan) (1xTubmanburg and 1x Voinjama)
- Infantry Battalion (Namibia)
- Engineering Battalion (Pakistan)
- Hospital (Pakistan)

=== Sector 2 ===
- 2 x Infantry Battalion
- Infantry Battalion (Ghana)
- Engineering Battalion (Pakistan)

=== Sector 3 ===
- 3 x Infantry Battalion (Bangladesh)
- Engineering Company (Bangladesh)
- Hospital (Bangladesh)

=== Sector 4 ===
- 3 x Infantry Battalion (Ethiopia)
- Infantry Battalion (Senegal)
- Hospital (Senegal)
- Hospital (China)
- Engineering Company (China)

=== Sector B ===
The Sector B area of responsibility covers Lofa, Bong, Nimba, Grand Gedeh, River Gee, Maryland and Grand Kru Counties. The sector headquarters is in Gbarnga, Bong County. Military units within this sector include one Pakistan infantry battalion, one Bangladesh infantry battalion and one Ghanaian infantry battalion, UNMO Teams 6-11, three level-2 hospitals (China, Bangladesh and Pakistan), Bangladesh signal company, Bangladesh logistics company and Bangladesh military police unit.

The Canadian Forces designation for troops sent to the mission was "Liane", including SHIRBRIG augmentation personnel in late 2003.
