= United Nations Operation in Côte d'Ivoire =

Peacekeeping mission

Operation in Côte d'Ivoire
- Abbreviation: UNOCI
- Formation: 4 April 2004
- Dissolved: 30 June 2017
- Type: Peacekeeping mission
- Legal status: Accomplished
- Headquarters: Abidjan, Côte d'Ivoire
- Head: Aïchatou Mindaoudou
- Parent organization: United Nations Security Council
- Website: https://onuci.unmissions.org/en

The United Nations Operation in Côte d'Ivoire (UNOCI) (French: Opération des Nations Unies en Côte d'Ivoire (ONUCI)) was a UN-NATO peacekeeping mission in Ivory Coast (Côte d'Ivoire) whose objective was "to facilitate the implementation by the Ivorian parties of the peace agreement signed by them in January 2003" (which aimed to end the Ivorian Civil War). The two main Ivorian parties were the Ivorian Government forces who controlled the south of the country, and the New Forces (former rebels), who controlled the north. The UNOCI mission aimed to control a "zone of confidence" across the centre of the country separating the two parties. The Head of Mission and Special Representative of the Secretary-General was Aïchatou Mindaoudou Souleymane from Niger. She succeeded Bert Koenders from the Netherlands in 2013, who himself succeeded Choi Young-jin from South Korea in 2011. The mission officially ended on 30 June 2017.

The approved budget for the period July 2016 – June 2017 was $153,046,000. The last UN Security Council Resolution was 2284 (2016).

== Mandate ==
On 27 February 2004, during the First Ivorian Civil War, the United Nations (UN) Security Council adopted Resolution 1528, which authorized UNOCI to take over from the UN Mission in Côte d'Ivoire (MINUCI, French: Mission des Nations unies en Côte d'Ivoire), an existing political mission to Ivory Coast. It had an initial authorised strength of 6,240 uniformed personnel, and was expanded by Resolution 1609 on 24 June 2005 and Resolution 1682 on 2 June 2006.

In February 2006, following an appeal by UN Secretary General Kofi Annan, the Security Council agreed to strengthen the UNOCI forces by sending a battalion from United Nations Mission in Liberia with 800 soldiers to Ivory Coast. As of November 2006, the mission consisted of about 8,000 uniformed soldiers from a total of 41 countries. They have included, from the Bangladeshi Army, 56th and 57th Battalions, East Bengal Regiment. They were deployed alongside 4,000 French soldiers of the Opération Licorne intervention.

On 29 July 2008, the day before UNOCI's mandate was set to expire, the UN Security Council unanimously voted to extend its mandate to 31 January 2009 so that the peacekeepers could "support the organization of free, open, fair and transparent elections". A presidential election was planned for 2009, after numerous delays arising from postwar issues. UNOCI's mandate was subsequently extended several times, including on 31 October 2008, 31 January 2010, 27 May 2010, 20 December 2010, and most recently on 27 July 2011.

== History ==
In January 2006, supporters of President Laurent Gbagbo attacked the base of the United Nations peacekeepers after the Ivorian Popular Front withdrew from the Ivorian Civil War peace process. About 1,000 protesters invaded the UN base at Guiglo.

In the aftermath of the 2010 presidential election, incumbent president Gbagbo said UNOCI troops should leave the country. However, the UN refused to do so, upon which Gbagbo's aides then said UN troops would be treated as "rebels" should they stay in the country, where they are protecting the internationally recognised though domestically disputed winner of the election.

On 30 March United Nations Security Council Resolution 1975 was issued which, in particular, urged all Ivorian parties to respect the will of the people and the election of Alassane Ouattara as President of Ivory Coast, as recognised by the Economic Community of West African States (ECOWAS), the African Union and the rest of the international community and reiterated that UNOCI could use "all necessary measures" in its mandate to protect civilians under imminent threat of attack.

Heavy fighting broke out on 31 March 2011 as forces of Alassane Ouattara advanced on Abidjan from several directions. The United Nations peacekeepers took control of Abidjan's airport when Gbagbo's forces abandoned it and United Nations forces were also reported to be carrying out protective security operations in the city. The UN peacekeeping mission said its headquarters were fired on by Gbabgo's special forces on 31 March, and returned fire in an exchange lasting about three hours. UN convoys have also come under attack by Gbagbo loyalists four times since 31 March, with three peacekeepers injured in one of the attacks. The peacekeepers had exchanged fire with Gbagbo loyalists in several parts of the city.

On 4 April 2011 UN and French helicopters also began firing on pro-Gbagbo military installations, a French military spokesman said the attacks were aimed at heavy artillery and armoured vehicles. Eyewitnesses reported seeing two UN Mi-24P attack helicopters firing missiles at the Akouédo military camp in Abidjan. UN helicopters were flown by Ukrainian Ground Forces crews seconded to the United Nations. The attacks sparked protests by a Gbagbo spokesperson, who said that such actions were "illegal, illegitimate and unacceptable." UN Secretary-General Ban Ki-moon defended the actions, however, saying that "the [UN] mission has taken this action in self-defence and to protect civilians." He noted that Gbagbo's forces had fired on United Nations patrols and attacked the organization's headquarters in Abidjan "with heavy-caliber sniper fire as well as mortars and rocket-propelled grenades", wounding four peacekeepers. Russian Foreign Minister Sergei Lavrov said that Russia intended to look into the legitimacy of the use of force by UN peacekeepers. The position of the Russian government was that any foreign interference would only lead to increasing violence.

On 9 April, pro-Gbagbo forces were reported to have fired on the Golf Hotel, where Ouattara was located. The attackers reportedly used both sniper rifles and mortars; in response, UN peacekeepers fired on them. The following day, United Nations and French forces carried out further air strikes against Gbagbo's remaining heavy weapons, using Mi-24 and Aérospatiale Gazelle attack helicopters. The attack was reported to have caused heavy damage to the presidential palace.

On 11 April, UN forces stormed Gbagbo's residence and arrested him. The final assault was assisted by French forces using helicopters and armoured vehicles, although the actual capture was made by Ouattara's troops. Gbagbo, his wife, son and about 50 members of his entourage were captured unharmed and were taken to the Golf Hotel, Ouattara's headquarters, where they were placed under United Nations guard.

== Casualties ==
Up until 31 December 2016, a total of 143 UN peacekeeping troops had died.

On 8 June 2012, seven Niger soldiers, eight locals and one or two Ivorian soldiers were killed in an attack near the village of Taï in the southwestern region of the country. As a result of the attack, thousands of villagers fled from the area. The deaths were suspected to have occurred as a result of a border-crossing ambush by a Liberian militia. Secretary-General of the United Nations Ban Ki-moon said he was "saddened and outraged" by the deaths. Ban urged the Ivorian government to "identify the perpetrators and hold them accountable." Ivorian Defense minister Paul Koffi Koffi said that soldiers "must go to the other side of the border to establish a security zone." Liberian Information Minister Lewis Brown said that president Ellen Johnson Sirleaf had ordered the immediate deployment of forces to the border in response to the attack.

== Forces ==
On 30 April 2012 the force comprised 10,954 total uniformed personnel, including 9,404 troops, 200 military observers, 1,350 police, 400 international civilian personnel, 758 local staff and 290 United Nations Volunteers. The force commander was Major-General Hafiz Masroor Ahmed from Pakistan. The police commissioner was Major-General Jean Marie Bourry from France.

On 31 March 2017 the mission comprised 17 uniformed personnel, including 7 troops and 10 police as well as 689 civilian personnel.

=== Force commanders ===
- Abdoulaye Fall (Senegal) : April 2004 – April 2006
- Fernand Marcel Amoussou (Benin) : April 2006 – March 2010
- Abdul Hafiz (Bangladesh) : April 2010 – March 2011
- Gnakoudè Béréna (Togo) : March 2011 – May 2012
- Muhammad Iqbal Asi (Pakistan) : May 2012 – 19 May 2014
- Hafiz Masroor Ahmed (Pakistan) : 19 May 2014 – 30 June 2015
- Didier L'Hôte (France): 1 July 2015 – 30 June 2017

== Sexual abuse allegations ==
In July 2007, the UN suspended a Moroccan contingent from UNOCI in order to investigate allegations of widespread sexual abuse of Ivorian civilians by peacekeepers. In September 2011, 16 Beninese peacekeepers, including ten commanders, were barred from UN service following an investigation into allegations that they had traded food for sex with minors in Toulépleu. A UN spokesman said that UN staff in Ivory Coast were accused of sexual abuse on 42 occasions between 2007 and mid-2011, and that sixteen of those cases allegedly involved minors.
