= List of airports in Ivory Coast =

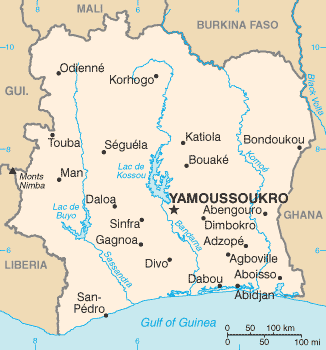
Map of Ivory Coast

List of airports in Ivory Coast (Côte d'Ivoire), sorted by location.

== List ==
Location	ICAO	IATA	Airport name
Abengourou	DIAU	OGO	Abengourou Airport
Abidjan	DIAP	ABJ	Port Bouët Airport (Félix Houphouët-Boigny Int'l)
Aboisso	DIAO	ABO	Aboisso Airport
Bocanda	DIBC		Bocanda Airport
Bondoukou	DIBU	BDK	Soko Airport
Bouaké	DIBK	BYK	Bouaké Airport
Bouna	DIBN	BQO	Tehini Airport
Boundiali	DIBI	BXI	Boundiali Airport
Dabou	DIDB		Dabou Airport
Daloa	DIDL	DJO	Daloa Airport
Dimbokro	DIDK	DIM	Dimbokro Airport
Gagnoa	DIGA	GGN	Gagnoa Airport
Grand-Béréby	DIGN	BBV	Nero-Mer Airport
Guiglo	DIGL	GGO	Guiglo Airport
Katiola		KTC	Katiola Airport
Korhogo	DIKO	HGO	Korhogo Airport
Man	DIMN	MJC	Man Airport
Odienné	DIOD	KEO	Odienné Airport
San Pédro	DISP	SPY	San Pédro Airport
Sassandra	DISS	ZSS	Sassandra Airport
Séguéla	DISG	SEO	Séguéla Airport
Tabou	DITB	TXU	Tabou Airport
Touba	DITM	TOZ	Mahana Airport
Yamoussoukro	DIYO	ASK	Yamoussoukro International Airport

== See also ==
- Transport in Ivory Coast
- List of airports by ICAO code: D#DI - Côte d'Ivoire (Ivory Coast)
- Wikipedia: WikiProject Aviation/Airline destination lists: Africa#Côte d'Ivoire
