= Outline of Ivory Coast =

Country in West Africa

The Flag of Ivory Coast

The Coat of arms of Ivory Coast

The location of Ivory Coast

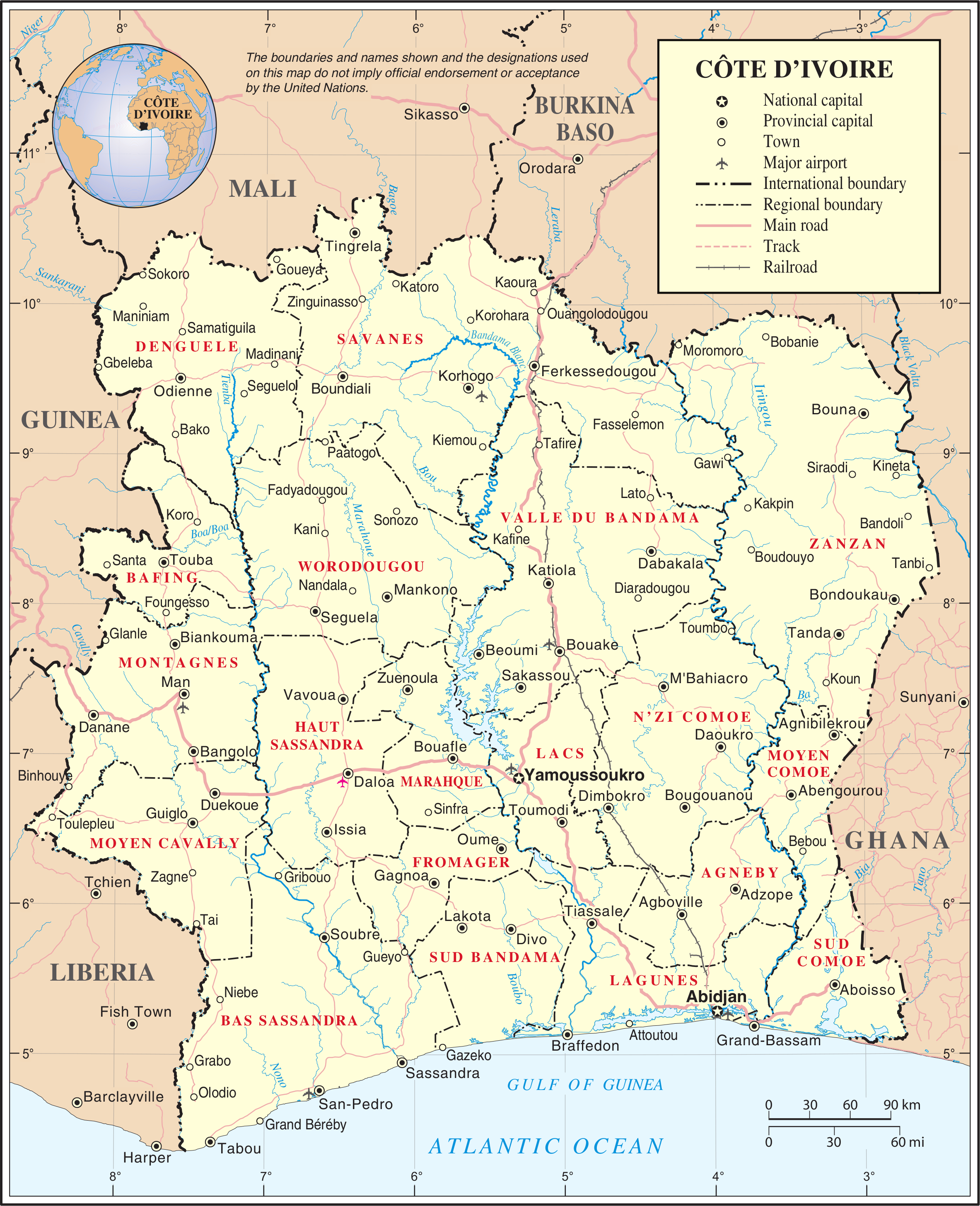
An enlargeable map of the Ivory Coast

The following outline is provided as an overview of and topical guide to Ivory Coast:

Ivory Coast – country in West Africa. An 1843–1844 treaty made Ivory Coast a protectorate of France and in 1893, it became a French colony as part of the European scramble for Africa. Ivory Coast became independent on 7 August 1960. Through production of coffee and cocoa, the country was an economic powerhouse during the 1960s and 1970s in West Africa. However, Ivory Coast went through an economic crisis in the 1980s, leading to the country's period of political and social turmoil. The 21st century Ivorian economy is largely market-based and relies heavily on agriculture, with smallholder cash crop production being dominant. The country's official name is the Republic of Côte d'Ivoire.

== General reference ==
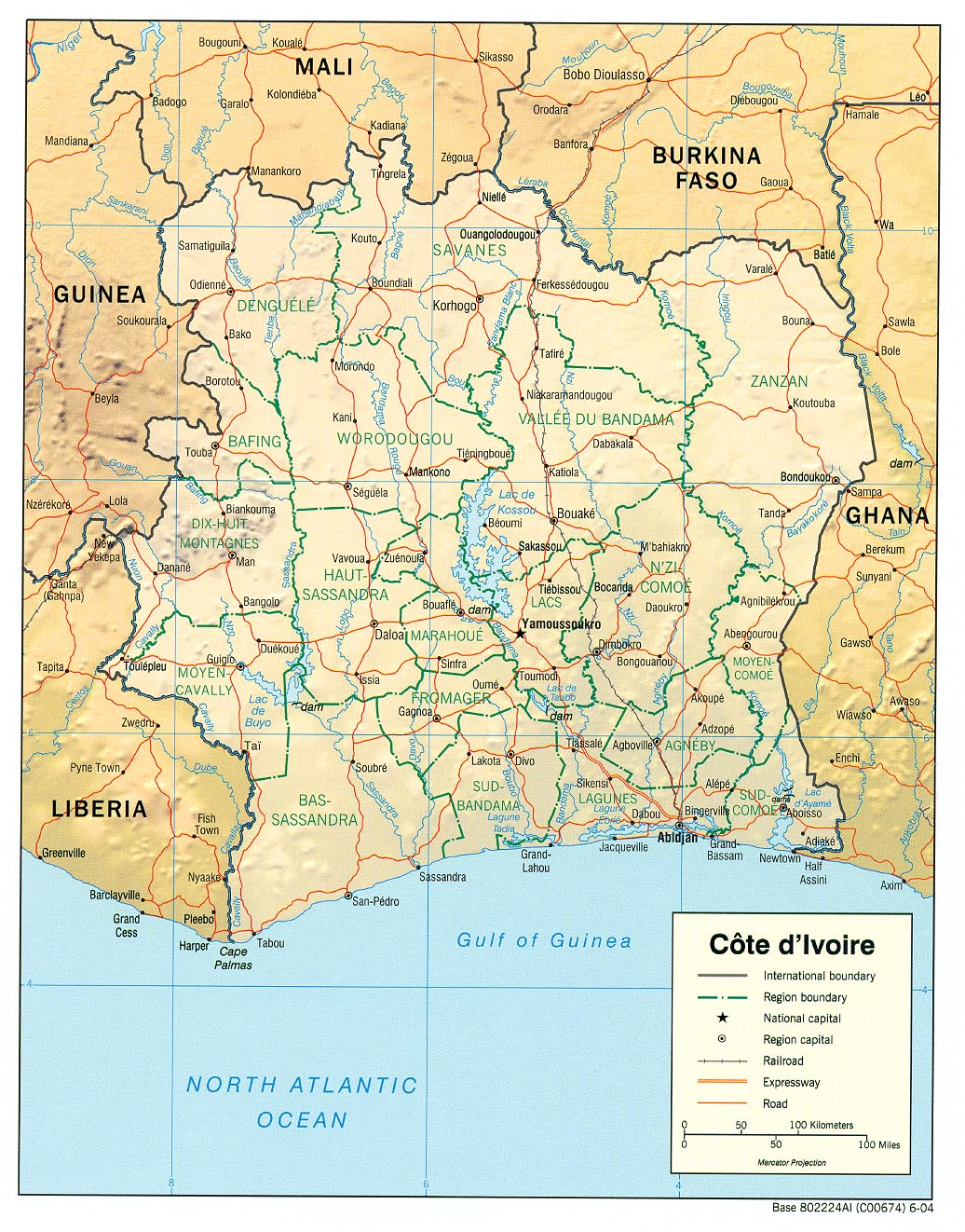
An enlargeable relief map of Ivory Coast

- Pronunciation: /ˌkoʊt diːˈvwɑːr/
- Common English country name: Ivory Coast or Ivory Coast
- Official English country name: République de Côté d’Ivoire
- Common endonym(s): Côte d'Ivoire.
- Official endonym(s): Republic of Côte d'Ivoire.
- Adjectival(s): Ivorian (Ivoirien)
- Demonym(s): Ivorian(s)
- ISO country codes: CI, CIV, 384
- ISO region codes: See ISO 3166-2:CI
- Internet country code top-level domain: .ci

== Geography of Ivory Coast ==
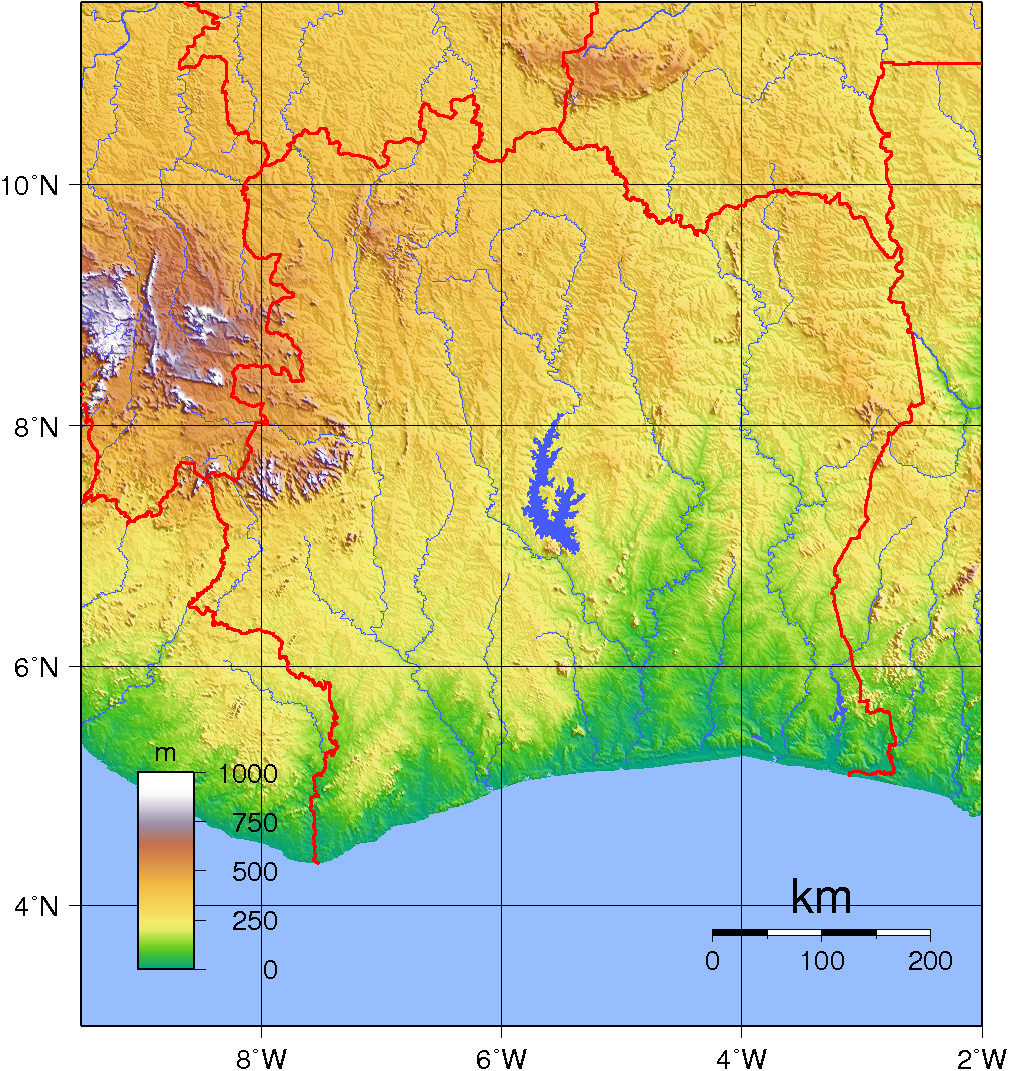
An enlargeable topographic map of Ivory Coast

- Ivory Coast is: a country
- Population of Ivory Coast: 19,262,000 - 50th most populous country
- Area of Ivory Coast: 322,460 km^{2}
- Atlas of Ivory Coast

=== Location ===
- Ivory Coast is situated within the following regions
  - Northern Hemisphere and Western Hemisphere
    - Africa
      - West Africa
- Time zone: Coordinated Universal Time UTC+00
- Extreme points of Ivory Coast
  - High: Mont Nimba 1,752 m (5,748 ft)
  - Low: Gulf of Guinea 0 m
- Land boundaries: 3,110 km

Liberia 716 km
Ghana 668 km
Guinea 610 km
Burkina Faso 584 km
Mali 532 km

- Coastline: 515 km

=== Environment of Ivory Coast ===
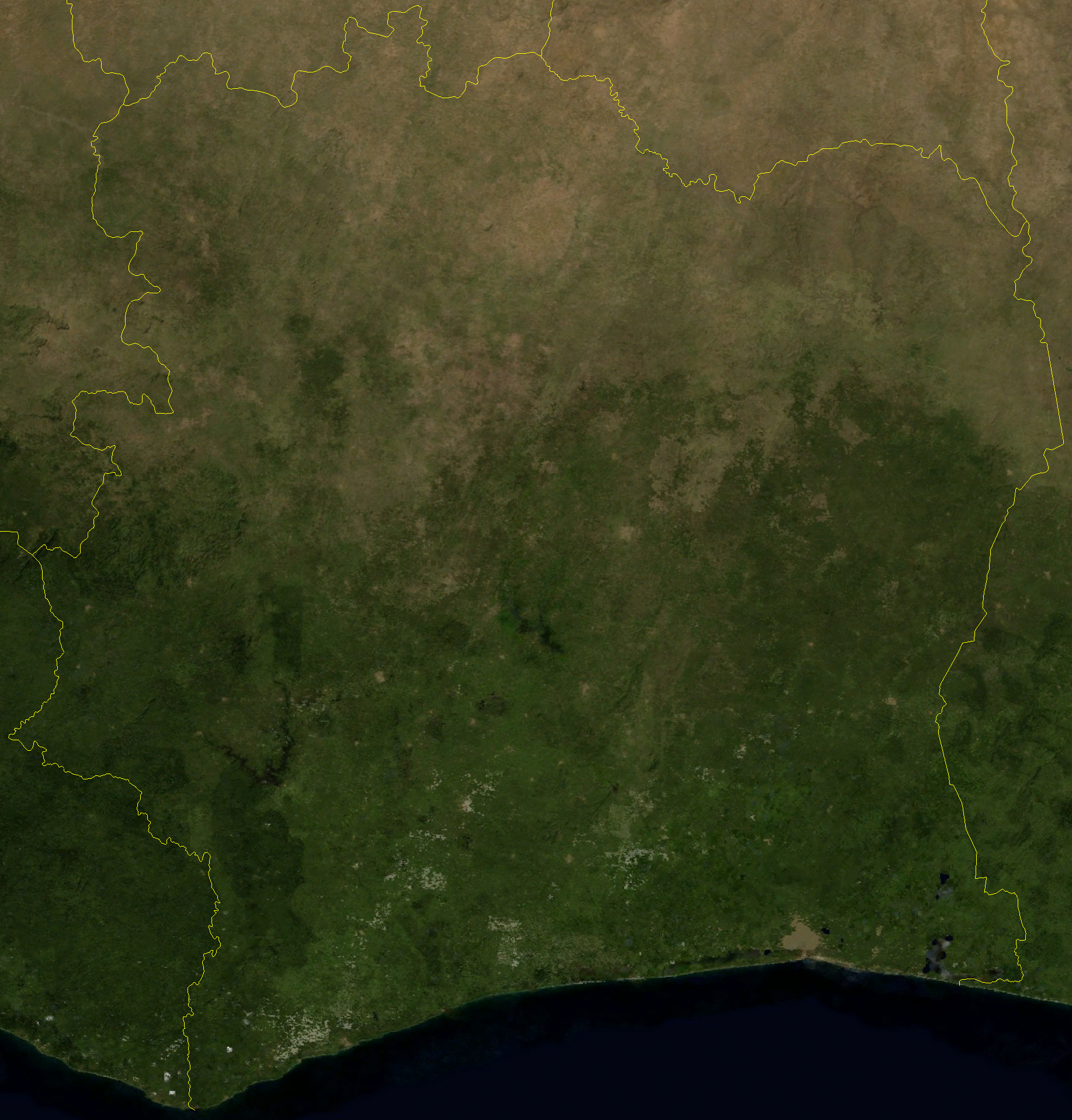
An enlargeable satellite image of Ivory Coast

- Climate of Ivory Coast
- Ecoregions in Ivory Coast
- Protected areas of Ivory Coast]
  - National parks of Ivory Coast
- Wildlife of Ivory Coast
  - Fauna of Ivory Coast
    - Birds of Ivory Coast
    - Mammals of Ivory Coast

==== Natural geographic features of Ivory Coast ====
- Glaciers in Ivory Coast: none
- Rivers of Ivory Coast
- World Heritage Sites in Ivory Coast

=== Regions of Ivory Coast ===
==== Administrative divisions of Ivory Coast ====
Administrative divisions of Ivory Coast

- Regions of Ivory Coast
  - Departments of Ivory Coast

===== Municipalities of Ivory Coast =====
- Capital of Ivory Coast: Yamoussoukro, formerly Abidjan
- Cities of Ivory Coast

=== Demography of Ivory Coast ===
Demographics of Ivory Coast

== Government and politics of Ivory Coast ==
Politics of Ivory Coast

- Form of government: presidential republic
- Capital of Ivory Coast: Yamoussoukro, formerly Abidjan
- Elections in Ivory Coast

=== Executive branch of the government of Ivory Coast ===
- Head of state: President of Ivory Coast, Alassane Ouattara
- Head of government: Prime Minister of Ivory Coast, Robert Beugré Mambé

=== Legislative branch of the government of Ivory Coast ===
- National Assembly (Ivory Coast) (unicameral parliament)

=== Foreign relations of Ivory Coast ===
- Diplomatic missions in Ivory Coast
- Diplomatic missions of Ivory Coast

==== International organization membership ====
The Republic of Ivory Coast is a member of:

- African, Caribbean, and Pacific Group of States (ACP)
- African Development Bank Group (AfDB)
- African Union (AU)
- Conference des Ministres des Finances des Pays de la Zone Franc (FZ)
- Council of the Entente (Entente)
- Economic Community of West African States (ECOWAS)
- Food and Agriculture Organization (FAO)
- Group of 24 (G24)
- Group of 77 (G77)
- International Atomic Energy Agency (IAEA)
- International Bank for Reconstruction and Development (IBRD)
- International Civil Aviation Organization (ICAO)
- International Criminal Court (ICCt) (signatory)
- International Criminal Police Organization (Interpol)
- International Development Association (IDA)
- International Federation of Red Cross and Red Crescent Societies (IFRCS)
- International Finance Corporation (IFC)
- International Fund for Agricultural Development (IFAD)
- International Labour Organization (ILO)
- International Maritime Organization (IMO)
- International Monetary Fund (IMF)
- International Olympic Committee (IOC)
- International Organization for Migration (IOM)
- International Red Cross and Red Crescent Movement (ICRM)
- International Telecommunication Union (ITU)
- International Telecommunications Satellite Organization (ITSO)
- International Trade Union Confederation (ITUC)
- Inter-Parliamentary Union (IPU)
- Islamic Development Bank (IDB)
- Multilateral Investment Guarantee Agency (MIGA)
- Nonaligned Movement (NAM)
- Organisation internationale de la Francophonie (OIF)
- Organisation of Islamic Cooperation (OIC)
- Organisation for the Prohibition of Chemical Weapons (OPCW)
- Union Latine
- United Nations (UN)
- United Nations Conference on Trade and Development (UNCTAD)
- United Nations Educational, Scientific, and Cultural Organization (UNESCO)
- United Nations High Commissioner for Refugees (UNHCR)
- United Nations Industrial Development Organization (UNIDO)
- Universal Postal Union (UPU)
- West African Development Bank (WADB)
- West African Economic and Monetary Union (WAEMU)
- World Confederation of Labour (WCL)
- World Customs Organization (WCO)
- World Federation of Trade Unions (WFTU)
- World Health Organization (WHO)
- World Intellectual Property Organization (WIPO)
- World Meteorological Organization (WMO)
- World Tourism Organization (UNWTO)
- World Trade Organization (WTO)

=== Law and order in Ivory Coast ===
- Law Enforcement in Ivory Coast
- Constitution of Ivory Coast
- Human rights in Ivory Coast
  - LGBT rights in Ivory Coast

=== Military of Ivory Coast ===
Military of Ivory Coast

== History of Ivory Coast ==
=== Period-coverage ===
- 1960 to 1999
- 1999 to present

=== History of Ivory Coast, by subject ===
- Economic history of Ivory Coast

== Culture of Ivory Coast ==
Culture of Ivory Coast

- Languages of Ivory Coast
- National symbols of Ivory Coast
  - Coat of arms of Ivory Coast
  - Flag of Ivory Coast
  - National anthem of Ivory Coast
- Prostitution in Ivory Coast
- Public holidays in Ivory Coast
- Religion in Ivory Coast
  - Hinduism in Ivory Coast
  - Islam in Ivory Coast
- World Heritage Sites in Ivory Coast

=== Art in Ivory Coast ===
- Music of Ivory Coast

=== Sports in Ivory Coast ===
- Football in Ivory Coast
- Ivory Coast at the Olympics

== Economy and infrastructure of Ivory Coast ==
Economy of Ivory Coast

- Economic rank, by nominal GDP (2007): 97th (ninety-seventh)
- Agriculture in Ivory Coast
  - Cocoa production in Ivory Coast
- Communications in Ivory Coast
- Companies of Ivory Coast
- Currency of Ivory Coast: Franc
  - ISO 4217: XOF
- Energy in Ivory Coast
- Mining in Ivory Coast
- Tourism in Ivory Coast
- Transport in Ivory Coast
  - Airports in Ivory Coast
  - Rail transport in Ivory Coast

== Education in Ivory Coast ==
Education in Ivory Coast

== See also ==
- List of Ivory Coast-related topics
- List of international rankings
- Member state of the United Nations
- Outline of Africa
- Outline of geography
