= List of defunct airlines of Côte d'Ivoire =

This is a list of defunct airlines of Ivory Coast.

Airline	Image	IATA	ICAO	Callsign	Commenced operations	Ceased operations	Notes
Afrique Regional Airlines					2003	2004	
Air Afrique		RK	RKA	AIRAFRIC	1961	2002	
Air Alize Afrique					2002	2002	
Air Continental					1997	2002	
Air Inter Ivoire			NTV		1968	2006	
Air Ivoire		VU	VUN	AIRIVOIRE	1960	1999	Renamed to Nouvelle Air Ivoire
Air Ivoire		VU	VUN	AIRIVOIRE	2002	2011	Renamed from Nouvelle Air Ivoire
Airtransivoire					1973	1998	Operated Douglas DC-3, Cessna 310, Cessna 402, Partenavia P.68
Interivoire			NTV	INTER-IVOIRE	1978	1979	
Ivoire Airways		XV	IVW		2004	2004	
Ivoirienne de Transports Aeriens		I3	IVN		2006	2009	Operated Boeing 727, Boeing 737, HS 748, Saab 340
Nouvelle Air Ivoire			VUN	AIRIVOIRE	2001	2002	Established as Air Ivoire. Renamed to Air Ivoire
Panafrican Airways		PQ	PNF		2003	2005	
Sophia Airlines					2006	2011	Operated Beech 1900D, HS 748, Let Turbolet
Vansco Air Freight					2006	2011	Operated Lockheed L-100 Hercules

== See also ==
- List of airlines of Ivory Coast
- List of airports in Ivory Coast
