= List of companies of Ivory Coast =

Location of the Ivory Coast

Ivory Coast (also known as Côte d'Ivoire) is a country located in West Africa. Ivory Coast's political capital is Yamoussoukro, and its economic capital and largest city is the port city of Abidjan. Ivory Coast has, for the region, a relatively high income per capita (US$1014.4 in 2013) and plays a key role in transit trade for neighboring, landlocked countries. The country is the largest economy in the West African Economic and Monetary Union, constituting 40% of the monetary union’s total GDP. The country is the world's largest exporter of cocoa beans, and the fourth-largest exporter of goods, in general, in sub-Saharan Africa (following South Africa, Nigeria, and Angola).

== Notable firms ==
This list includes notable companies with primary headquarters located in the country. The industry and sector follow the Industry Classification Benchmark taxonomy. Organizations which have ceased operations are included and noted as defunct.

Notable companies Status: P=Private, S=State; A=Active, D=Defunct
Name	Industry	Sector	Headquarters	Founded	Notes	Status	
Abidjan Transport Company	Consumer services	Travel & tourism	Abidjan	1960	Passenger transit, infrastructure	P	A
Air Afrique	Consumer services	Airlines	Abidjan	1961	Airline, defunct 2002	P	D
Air Côte d'Ivoire	Consumer services	Airlines	Abidjan	2012	State airline	S	A
Air Ivoire	Consumer services	Airlines	Abidjan	1960	Airline, defunct 2011	P	D
Autonomous Port of Abidjan	Industrials	Transportation services	Abidjan	1951	Commercial port	P	A
Interivoire	Consumer services	Airlines	Abidjan	1978	Airline, defunct 1979	P	D
Ivoirienne de Transports Aériens	Industrials	Delivery services	Abidjan	2007	Cargo airline	P	A
La Poste	Industrials	Delivery services	Abidjan	1945	Postal services	P	A
Nouvelle Air Ivoire	Consumer services	Airlines	Abidjan	1999	Airline, merged into Air Ivoire in 2000	P	D

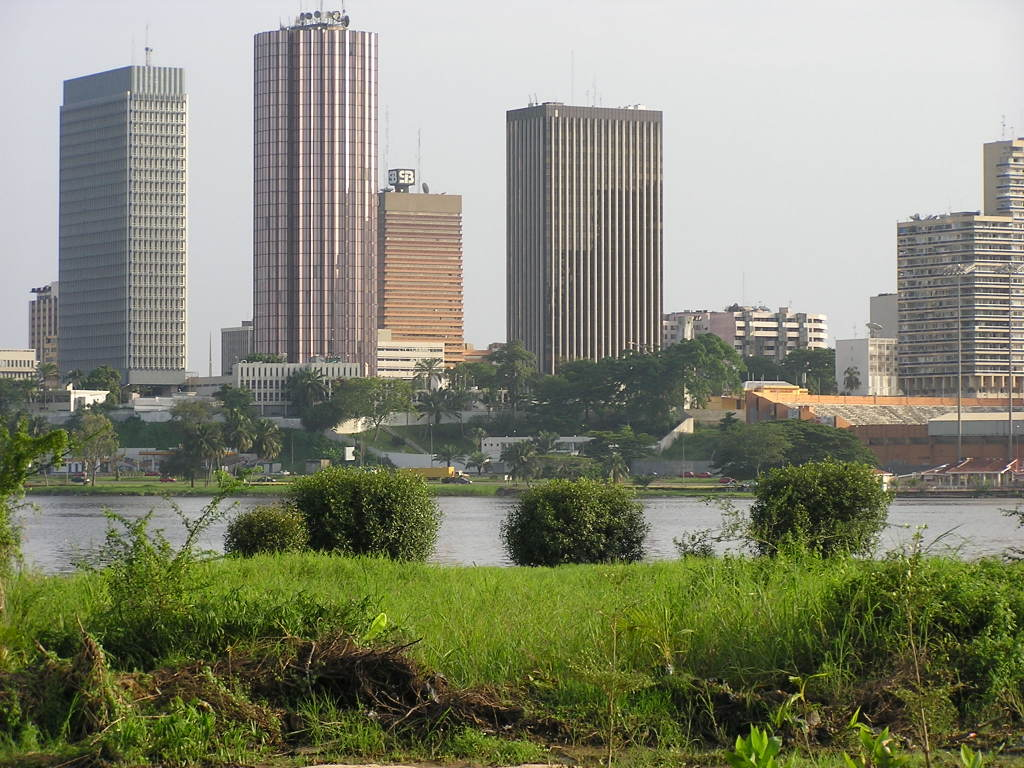
Abidjan financial center.

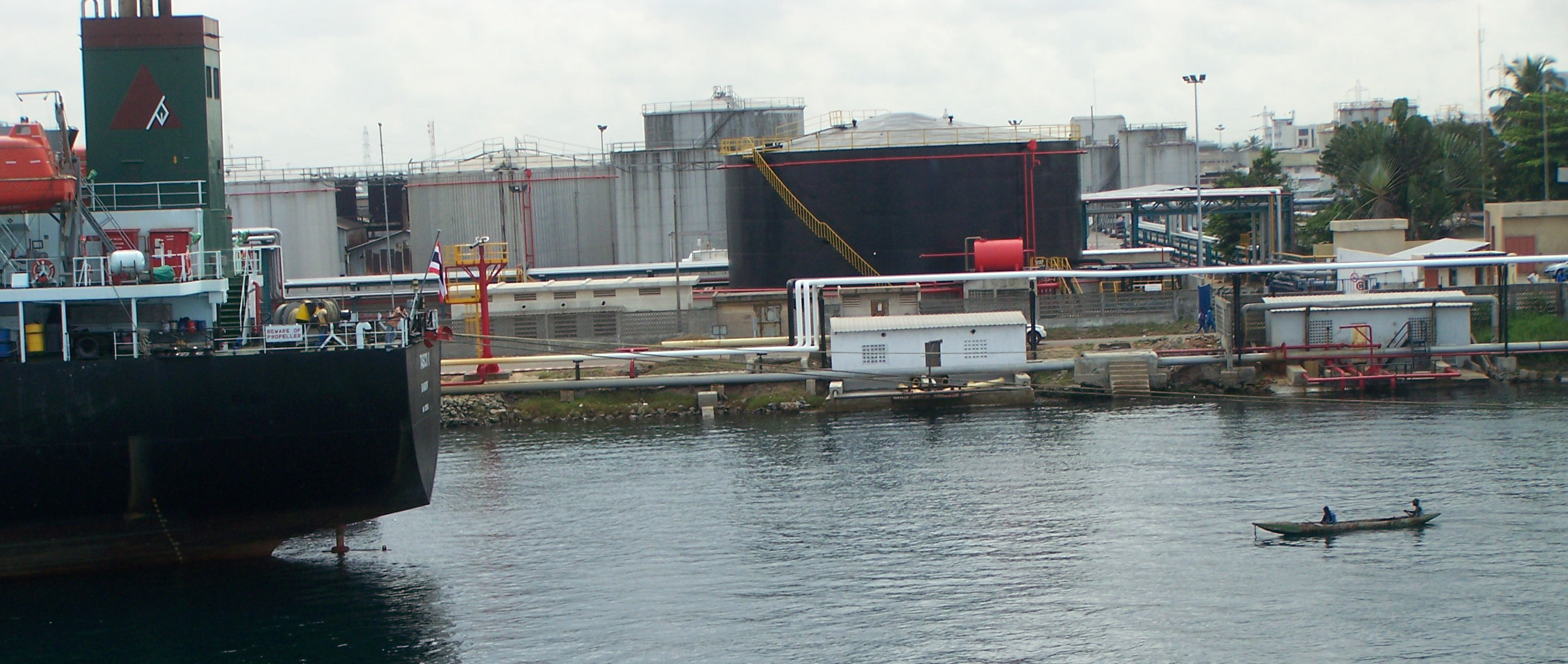
Autonomous Port of Abidjan in 2009.

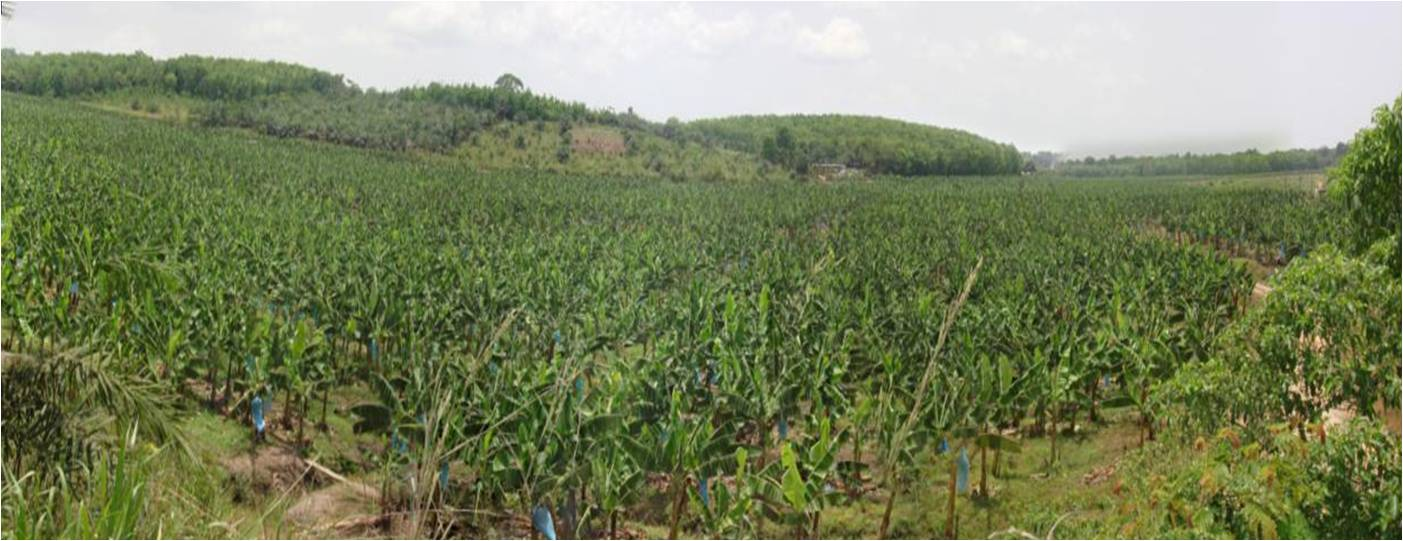
A banana plantation in the Ivory Coast.
