= Diodes (disambiguation) =

A diode is a device that is a two-terminal electronic component that conducts electric current in only one direction.

Diode or Diodes may also refer to:

- Diodes Incorporated, an American semiconductor manufacturer
- The Diodes, a Canadian punk/new wave band

== See also ==
- Data diode, a type of unidirectional computer network
- Odienné Airport (ICAO code: DIOD), in Côte d'Ivoire
