= HGO =

HGO may refer to:

- HGO Trust (formerly Hampstead Garden Opera), in London
- Houston Grand Opera, in Houston, Texas, United States
- Mercury(II) oxide (chemical symbol HgO)
- Héctor Germán Oesterheld (1919–1977), Argentine science fiction and comics writer, popularly known by his initials HGO
- Korhogo Airport in Côte d'Ivoire (IATA code HGO)
- One Air, British cargo airline (ICAO code HGO)
- Högskolan på Gotland university of Gotland, Sweden
