= List of airlines of Ivory Coast =

This is a list of airlines currently operating in Ivory Coast.

Airline	Image	IATA	ICAO	Callsign	Founded	Notes
Aero Corporate			ARP	IVORYCORP	?	
Afric'air Express			AAX	AFREX	?	
Afrik Airways			CIW		2010	
Air Bandama			BDM	BANDAMA	2007	
Air Côte d'Ivoire		HF	VRE	COTE D'IVOIRE	2012	
CI-Tours			VCI	CI-TOURS	2007	
Ivoire Aero Services			IVS	IVOIRE AERO	?	
Ivoirienne de Transports Aériens		I3	IVN		2007	
Lyca Cargo					2015	Operated Boeing 727
Solenta Aviation Côte d'Ivoire			SIV	SOLENT-IVORIE	2010	
Westair Cargo Airlines			WSC	WESTCAR	2005	

== See also ==
- List of airlines
- Airtransivoire
