= Air Côte d'Ivoire =

Flag carrier of Ivory Coast

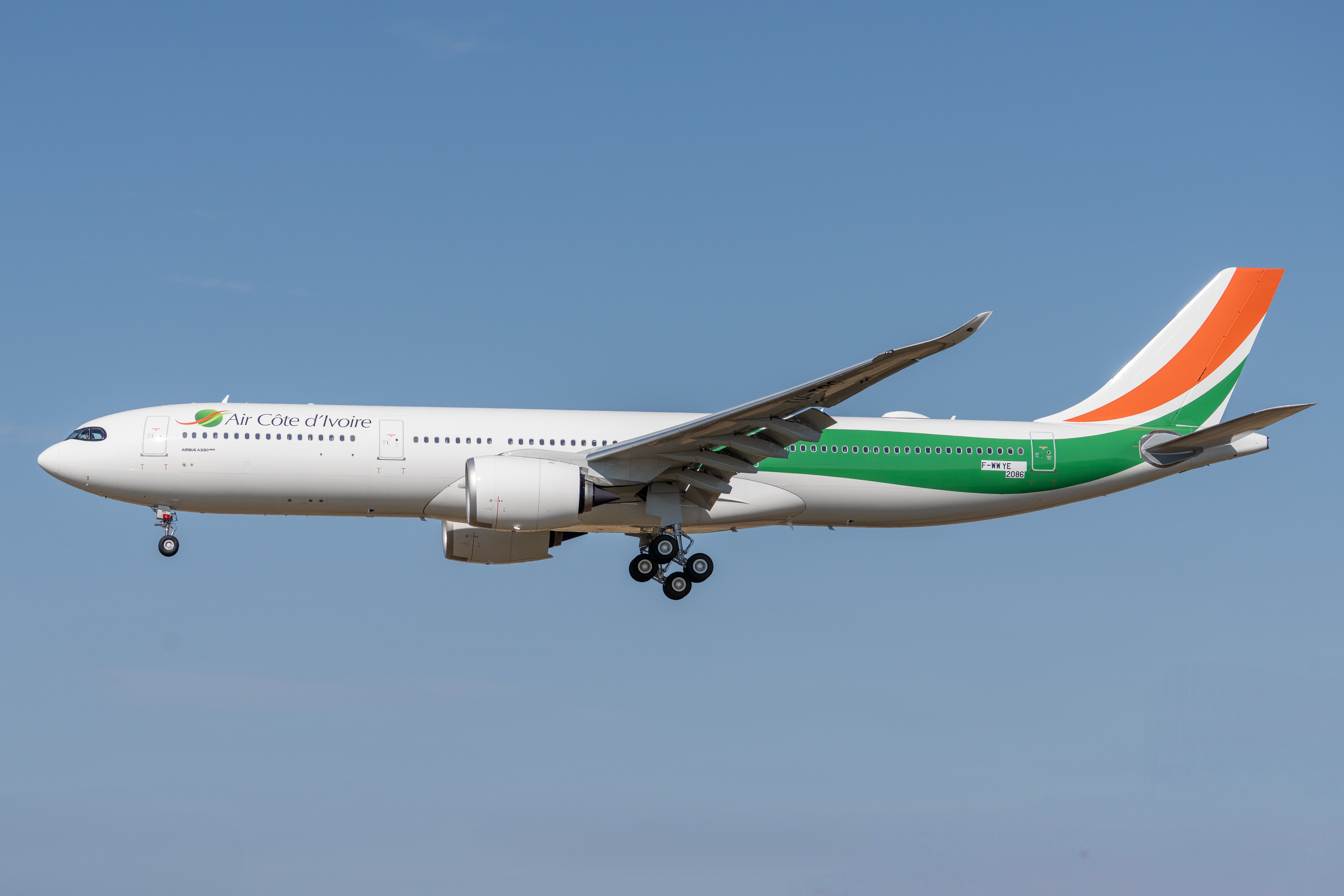
- Air Cote d'Ivoire Airbus A330-900
IATA	ICAO	Call sign
HF	VRE	COTE D'IVOIRE
- Founded: 15 May 2012; 14 years ago
- Commenced operations: 12 November 2012; 13 years ago
- Hubs: Port Bouet Airport
- Frequent-flyer program: sMiles
- Fleet size: 14
- Destinations: 27
- Parent company: Government of Ivory Coast (65%)
- Headquarters: Port Bouet Airport, Abidjan, Ivory Coast
- Key people: General (retired) Coulibaly Abdoulaye (chairman); Laurent Loukou (CEO)
- Revenue: XOF 48b (USD 88.7m) (2020)
- Website: www.aircotedivoire.com

Air Côte d'Ivoire is the flag carrier of Ivory Coast, based in Abidjan. The company succeeded the country's former flag carrier Air Ivoire, which went bankrupt in 2011. It started operations on 12 November 2012.

== History ==
The airline was set up on 15 May 2012, as a private-public entity, partially owned by Air France – which intended to make Port Bouet Airport a regional hub – and the Aga Khan Fund for Economic Development (AKFED). Air Côte d'Ivoire had an initial capital of CFAF 2.5 billion, majority-owned by the government of Ivory Coast (65%), with the balance held by Air France Finance (20%) and Aérienne de Participation-Côte d'Ivoire (15%), an airline holding company of AKFED. The Ivory Coast had had no national carriers since the collapse of Air Ivoire in March 2011.

The airline will have "technical, commercial and operational synergies" with Air Mali and Air Burkina, two other airlines associated with the AKFED.

As of November 2012, it was planned for the new company to have 13 flight captains, 12 first officers and 37 cabin crew. The company projects to have a passenger capacity of 330,000 per year. It carried 253,000 passengers during 2013.

== Corporate affairs ==
=== Ownership ===
As of April 2017, the parent entities of the shareholders are:

Shareholder	Interest
Government of Ivory Coast	58%
Air France-KLM	11%
Golden Road	23%
Other investors	8%
Total	100%

The Aga Khan Fund for Economic Development was a 15% shareholder until 2013, when it was reported that it would withdraw from Air Côte d'Ivoire. The shareholding was acquired by Golden Road, a consortium of private Ivorian investors, with shareholdings changing following subsequent fundraising.

=== Business trends ===
Air Côte d'Ivoire does not appear to publish annual accounts, but some figures have been made available via press reports, interviews and other publications (figures shown for years ending 31 December):

	2012	2013	2014	2015	2016	2017	2018	2019	2020
Turnover (CFA b)		26.98		76.01				83.00	48.00
Net profit after tax (CFA b)	loss	loss	loss	−7	loss	loss	loss	loss	loss
Number of employees (at year end)			290	612	578				600
Number of passengers (m)		0.25	0.40	0.60	0.72			0.76	0.30
Passenger load factor (%)					65				
Number of aircraft (at year end)	2	4	6	8	10	10	10	10	10
Notes/sources									(Note: 2020: Activities and income in 2020 were severely reduced by the impact of the coronavirus pandemic)

=== Key people ===
As of November 2025, Air Côte d'Ivoire's CEO is Laurent Loukou.

== Destinations ==
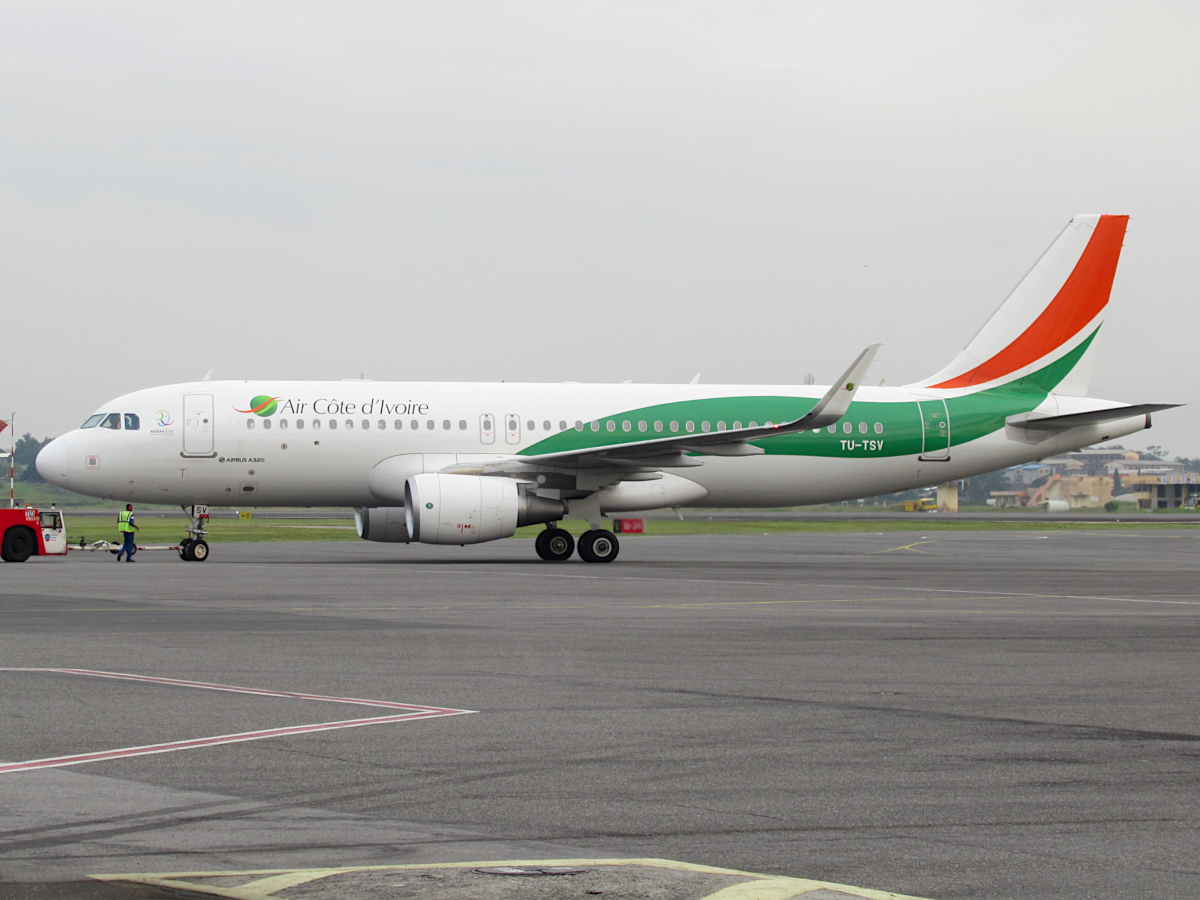
Air Côte d'Ivoire Airbus A320-200 at Léon-Mba International Airport in Libreville

As of September 2012, the airline had initial plans to operate scheduled services from its hub in Abidjan on a network covering nine international destinations in West and East Africa, although some of them would be flown by sister companies Air Burkina and Air Mali. Cities served with Air Côte d'Ivoire's own aircraft were expected to include Accra, Conakry, Cotonou and Dakar. Operations commenced on 12 November 2012, with the carrier's maiden flight linking Abidjan with Dakar.

As of July 2024, the company's route map indicate that it serves the following destinations:

Country	City	Airport	Notes	Refs
Benin	Cotonou	Cadjehoun Airport		
Burkina Faso	Ouagadougou	Thomas Sankara International Airport		
Cameroon	Douala	Douala International Airport		
Cameroon	Yaoundé	Yaoundé Nsimalen International Airport		
Central African Republic	Bangui	Bangui M'Poko International Airport	Terminated	
Chad	N'Djamena	N'Djamena International Airport	Terminated	
Democratic Republic of the Congo	Kinshasa	N'djili Airport		
France	Paris	Charles de Gaulle Airport		
Gabon	Libreville	Léon-Mba International Airport		
Ghana	Accra	Accra International Airport		
Guinea	Conakry	Conakry International Airport		
Guinea-Bissau	Bissau	Osvaldo Vieira International Airport		
Ivory Coast	Abidjan	Félix-Houphouët-Boigny International Airport	Hub	
Ivory Coast	Bouaké	Bouaké Airport		
Ivory Coast	Korhogo	Korhogo Airport		
Ivory Coast	Man	Man Airport		
Ivory Coast	Odienné	Odienné Airport		
Ivory Coast	San Pédro	San Pédro Airport		
Lebanon	Beirut	Beirut–Rafic Hariri International Airport		
Liberia	Monrovia	Roberts International Airport		
Mali	Bamako	Bamako–Sénou International Airport		
Morocco	Casablanca	Mohammed V International Airport		
Niger	Niamey	Diori Hamani International Airport		
Nigeria	Abuja	Nnamdi Azikiwe International Airport		
Nigeria	Lagos	Murtala Muhammed International Airport		
Republic of the Congo	Brazzaville	Maya-Maya Airport		
Republic of the Congo	Pointe-Noire	Pointe Noire Airport		
Senegal	Dakar	Blaise Diagne International Airport		
Sierra Leone	Freetown	Lungi International Airport	Terminated	
South Africa	Johannesburg	O. R. Tambo International Airport		
Togo	Lomé	Lomé–Tokoin International Airport		

=== Codeshare and interline agreements ===
Air Côte d'Ivoire has codeshare and interline agreements with the following airlines:

=== Codeshare ===
- Ethiopian Airlines

=== Interline ===
- APG Airlines
- Air Burkina
- Air France
- Emirates
- Hahn Air

== Fleet ==
=== Current fleet ===
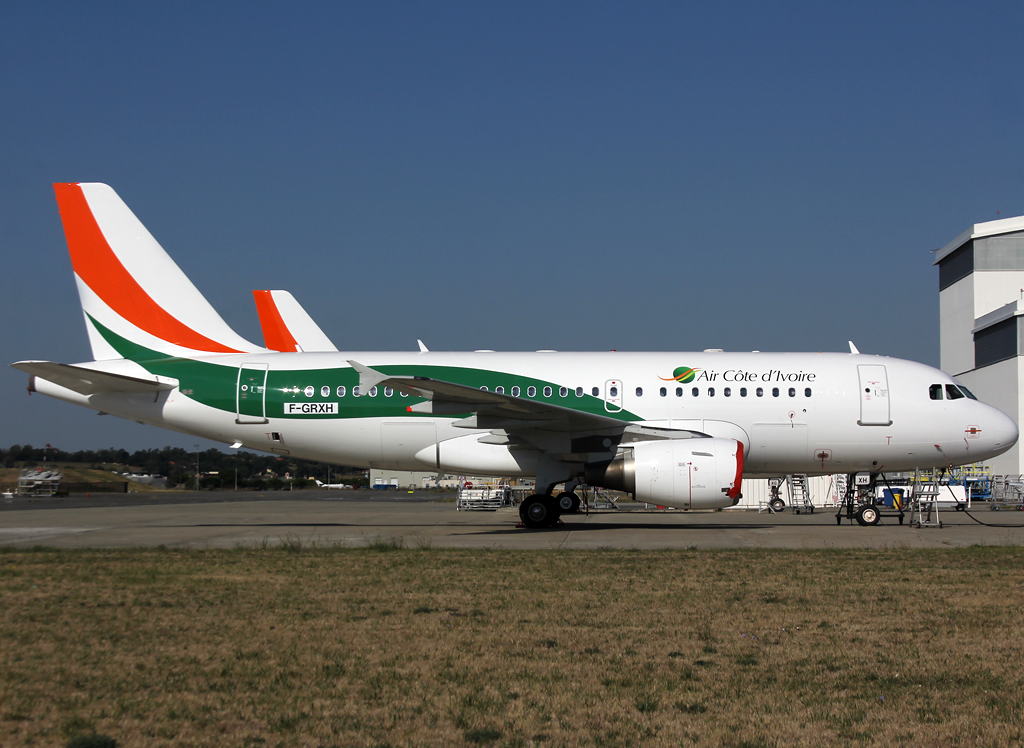
Air Côte d'Ivoire Airbus A319-100 at the Airbus factory in Toulouse (2012)

As of July 2026, Air Côte d'Ivoire operates the following aircraft:

Air Côte d'Ivoire fleet
Aircraft	In service	Orders	Passengers					Notes
Aircraft	In service	Orders	F	J	W	Y	Total	Notes
Airbus A319-100	5	—	—	12	—	96	108	
Airbus A320-200	2	—	—	12	—	138	150	
Airbus A320neo	1	—	TBA					
Airbus A330-900neo	2	—	4	44	21	173	242	
De Havilland Canada Dash 8-400	4	—	—	7	—	60	67	
Embraer 175	—	4	—	12	—	64	76	Order with 8 purchase rights. Deliveries begin 2027.
Total	14	4						

=== Fleet strategy ===
The carrier took delivery of its first aircraft, an ex-Air France Airbus A319 manufactured in 2004, in October 2012 on lease from Macquarie AirFinance. During the 2013 Dubai Air Show, it was announced the carrier placed a conditional order for up to four Bombardier Q400s. Worth US$69 million, (Note: Reuters informed the value of the transaction to be US$120 million.) a firm order was announced in December 2013. African Export-Import Bank will finance 95% of the acquisition. The carrier plans to use one of these aircraft to replace the E170 on regional services. The first Dash 8-Q400 was delivered in late 2014. An additional order for two more aircraft of the type was placed in April 2015.

An order comprising two Airbus A320neos and two Airbus A320ceos that was placed in April 2016 was boosted in July the same year when an additional A320neo was ordered. Air Côte d'Ivoire took delivery of their first Airbus A330-900 in early September 2025. In November 2025, Air Côte d'Ivoire placed an order for four Embraer 175s with options for eight more aircraft of the type, to expand domestic and regional routes.

=== Former fleet ===
As of September 2025, Air Côte d'Ivoire operated 5 Airbus A319, 2 Airbus A320, 1 Airbus A320neo, 2 Airbus A330-900neo, and 4 De Havilland Canada DHC-8-400

The airline has also operated the following aircraft:

- Embraer E170

== See also ==
- Airlines of Africa
- List of airlines of Ivory Coast
