= Economic history of Ivory Coast =

Since becoming an independent country, Ivory Coast has transitioned from an economy dominated by agriculture—coffee and cocoa in particular—to a diversified economy with a large service sector. From 1960 to 1976, government policy focused on investing revenues from agricultural export into infrastructure. From 1976 to 1980, factors such as a boom-bust in coffee and cocoa prices, over-investment funded by foreign debt, and a devaluation of the US Dollar led Ivory Coast to the brink of financial crisis. Decreased revenues from coffee and cocoa exports continued into the 80's and early 90's, increasing the burden of foreign debt and eventually requiring lender negotiation. This resulted in the privatization of many state-owned enterprises with mixed levels of success. In 1994, the economy began a comeback due to devaluation of the CFA franc, increased export revenues, financial reforms, and debt rescheduling. Since then the economy has been impacted by and rebounded from political crises such as the 1999 coup d'état and the 2011 election crisis.

== 1960-1975 ==
Since achieving independence from France in 1960, Ivory Coast's primary economic objective has been growth. During the 1960s, growth was accomplished by expanding and diversifying agricultural production, improving infrastructure, and developing import substitution industries. Implicit in this strategy was the emergence of an expanding domestic market to support budding consumer goods industries. Income redistribution and Ivorianization (replacement of expatriates with Ivorian workers) were made subordinate to growth. Although these goals were politically desirable, redistribution and Ivorianization would be impossible without growth, according to policymakers. Using revenues generated from agricultural exports, the government financed improvements to infrastructure—roads, ports, railroads, power generation, and schools. To finance increased agricultural production and industrial development, the government turned to foreign investment and imported technology. Much of the manual labor was supplied by non-Ivorian Africans.

By 1970, the government's strategy for economic growth and development appeared remarkably successful. Agricultural output of cash crops expanded, and, as evidence of diversification, the relative importance of unprocessed coffee, cocoa, and timber diminished as that of bananas, cotton, rubber, palm oil, and sugar grew. Using revenue from commodity sales, the government upgraded roads, improved communications, and raised the educational level of the workforce. Local factories were replacing some imports by producing a wide variety of light consumer goods. Between 1965 and 1975, surpluses from exports speeded growth in the secondary (industrial) and tertiary (services, administration, and defense) sectors. Gross domestic product (GDP) grew at an average annual rate of 7.9 percent in real terms, well ahead of the average annual population growth rate of approximately 4 percent.

== 1976-1980 ==
Between 1976 and 1980, external changes in the world economic system reverberated within Ivory Coast. Coffee and cocoa prices peaked in the 1976-77 period as a result of poor harvests in Latin America, but two years later prices declined rapidly. GDP continued to grow at an average rate of 7.6 percent per year; within this period, however, the growth rate varied from 2 percent in 1979 to 11.5 percent a year later. The government, which had responded to the boom phase by vigorously expanding public investment, was by 1979 forced to rely on foreign borrowing to sustain growth. At the same time, the declining value of the United States dollar, the currency in which Ivory Coast's loans were denominated, and rising prices for imported oil adversely affected the country's current account balance. By the end of the second phase, Ivory Coast was on the brink of a financial crisis.

During the 1970s, the government's economic objective of growth remained unchanged. Agriculture—coffee and cocoa in particular—remained the mainstay of the export economy and the largest component of GDP until they were overtaken by the service sector in 1978. But while agriculture represented about 75 percent of export earnings in 1965, that total had shrunk by 20 percent by 1975. Industrial GDP, derived primarily from import substitution manufacturing and agricultural processing, increased by 275 percent from 1970 to 1975, while industry's share of export earnings increased from 20 percent in 1965 to 35 percent in 1975. The fastest-growing sector of the economy was services, which as a share of GDP increased by more than 325 percent from 1965 to 1975.

At the same time, problems that arose during the previous decade required adjustments. To reduce production costs of manufactured goods, the government encouraged local production of intermediate inputs such as chemicals and textiles. The government also shifted some public investment from infrastructure to crop diversification and agricultural processing industries to improve export earnings. Meanwhile, work on such major projects as the Buyo hydroelectric generating station for continued. Foreign donors, attracted by Ivory Coast's stable political climate and profitable investment opportunities, provided capital for these endeavors. Until 1979, when coffee and cocoa prices plummeted and the cost of petroleum products rose sharply for a second time, virtually every economic indicator was favorable.

Beginning in the mid-1970s, the government undertook a major effort to diversify the export economy by expanding production of palm oil, natural rubber, coconut oil, cotton, sugar, and tropical fruits. The program was not a success: the market for palm and coconut oils was eroded by substitutes with lower saturated fat; sugar, produced by a grossly inefficient parastatal, simply added to a world surplus; and in other areas Ivory Coast was competing with other states of Africa and Asia that producing many of the same tropical agricultural goods.

Between 1960 and 1980, structural contradictions in Ivory Coast's economic strategy became apparent and presaged the serious problems of the 1980s. First, the emergence of a domestic market large enough to allow manufacturers of import substitutes to benefit from economies of scale required a wage for agricultural workers—the largest segment of the labor force—that was high enough to support mass consumption. But because the government relied on agricultural exports to finance improvements to infrastructure, commodity prices and wages could not be allowed to rise too high. Second, the government's focus on import substitution increased demand for intermediate inputs, the cost of which often exceeded that of the previously imported consumer goods. Moreover, Ivory Coast's liberal investment code encouraged capital-intensive rather than labor-intensive industrial development. Consequently, industrial growth contributed little to the growth of an industrial labor force or a domestic market, and prices for consumer goods remained high, reflecting the high costs of production and protection. The investment code also permitted vast sums to leave Ivory Coast in the form of tax-free profits, salary remittances, and repatriated capital. Decapitalization, or the outflow of capital, led to balance of payments problems and the need to export more commodities and limit agricultural wages. (As a result, the domestic market remained small, and consumer goods remained expensive.) By the start of the 1980s, as surpluses from commodity sales dwindled, the government continued to depend on foreign borrowing to stimulate the economy. Inexorably, the external debt and the burden of debt service grew.

== 1980s ==
In the 1980s, a combination of drought, low commodity prices, and rapidly rising debt costs exacerbated the structural weakness of the Ivoirian economy. Between 1977 and 1981, both cocoa and coffee prices fell on world markets, the current accounts balance dropped precipitously, and debt servicing costs rose, compelling the government to implement stabilization policies imposed by the International Monetary Fund (IMF). The economy sagged even more when a drought in the 1983-84 growing season cut agricultural and hydroelectric output at the same time as rising interest rates on international markets increased the debt burden. No sector of the economy was untouched. Between 1981 and 1984, GDP from industry dropped by 33 percent, GDP from services dropped by 9 percent, and GDP from agriculture dropped by 12.2 percent.

Between 1984 and 1986, a surge in commodity prices and output, coupled with increased support from Western financial institutions, provided a momentary economic boost. The record 1985 cocoa crop of 580,000 tons, combined with improved prices for coffee and cotton, bolstered export earnings and confidence in the economy. Following both the 1984–85 and the 1985-86 growing seasons, the government again increased producer prices for cocoa and coffee, resumed hiring civil servants, and raised some salaries, all of which led to an increase in consumption. Food production also increased during this period, allowing food imports to drop. Similarly, lower costs for oil imports helped the country attain a large commercial surplus by the end of 1986, thus considerably easing the balance of payments difficulties experienced earlier in the decade. These factors, combined with the rescheduling of foreign debt payments, gave the government some flexibility in handling its debt crisis and allowed it to begin paying its arrears to domestic creditors, including major construction and public works firms, supply companies, and local banks.

The economic resurgence turned out to be short-lived, however. In 1987 the economy again declined. Compared to the first six months of the previous year, sales of raw cocoa fell by 33 percent, and coffee exports plummeted by 62 percent. GDP declined by 5.8 per cent in real terms, reflecting the slide in local currency earnings from exports. The trade surplus fell by 49 percent, plunging the current account into deficit. Trade figures for the first half of 1987 revealed a 35 percent drop in the value of exports in comparison with the same period in 1986.

In May 1987, the government suspended payments on its massive foreign debt and appealed to official government lenders (the Paris Club) and commercial lenders (the London Club) to reschedule debt payments. The Paris Club acceded in December 1987; the London Club, in March 1988.

As negotiations proceeded, lenders pressured the government to introduce fiscal reforms. In January 1988, the government implemented a series of revenue-raising measures, which extended the value-added tax to the wholesale and retail trades and increased import tariffs, stamp duties, and tobacco taxes. In addition, the government initiated programs to privatize most state enterprises and parastatals (companies under joint government and private ownership) and to give a "new orientation" to industry. These programs affected all income groups in the country, but they had the greatest impact on the poor.

Privatization was not a new measure. In 1980 the state made divestment an official policy and offered to sell many state corporations and the state's shares in jointly owned enterprises. Because the response to divestment was sluggish, the government proposed innovative alternatives to outright denationalization, such as leasing arrangements and self-managing cooperatives. By 1987, however, only twenty-eight of the targeted enterprises (in agribusiness, trading and distribution, public works, and tourism) had been sold. Moreover, the state still accounted for 55 percent of the direct investment in the country.

The structural adjustments required by the World Bank in 1987 gave a new impetus to the divestment process. The government placed 103 industries in which it had holdings up for sale, although several companies considered to be of strategic importance to the country were later taken off the market. Included in this category were the Commodity Marketing and Price Control Board (Caisse de Stabilisation et de Soutien des Prix de Production Agricole (CSSPPA)), the Petroleum Operations Company of Ivory Coast (Société nationale d'opérations pétrolières de Côte d'Ivoire (Petroci), the Ivorian Maritime Transport Company (Société Ivoirienne de Transport Maritime (Sitram)), and the Ivorian Mining Company (Société pour le Developpement Minier de Côte d'Ivoire (Sodemi)).

Divestment was a mixed success at best. Although Ivorians took over more than half of the companies, those enterprises in which Ivorians held a majority of the capital were very small—three-quarters were capitalized at less than CFA F50 million—and their rate of return was substantially lower than that of foreign-owned and state enterprises. In general, the larger the capital of an enterprise, the smaller the proportion owned by Ivorians, contributing to capital flight.

In the mid-1980s, the government also implemented a program to modernize its import substitution industries and further expand exports to include processed foods, textiles, wood, and such nonagricultural products as building materials, chemicals, and electronics. The results of these plans were mixed. Exports produced under the industrial expansion program were more expensive—at least initially—than similar goods produced elsewhere and so required export subsidies. Subsidies, however, required scarce funds. Meanwhile, President Houphouet-Boigny adamantly refused to cut producer prices for coffee and cocoa; consequently, production levels increased—some estimates for the 1988-89 cocoa harvest were as high as 700,000 tons—which further depressed commodity prices.

The Ivorian economy as of the late 1980s was in a downward spiral, primarily because world prices for coffee and cocoa, the country's two principal exports, remained low. At the same time, exports of timber, the third largest source of foreign exchange, declined because of continued overexploitation. Two offshore petroleum fields, which in the early 1970s had been projected to make Ivory Coast self-sufficient in fuel, failed to achieve projected outputs, let alone self-sufficiency. Because of the relatively low world prices for petroleum and Ivory Coast's high production costs, all the wells in one field were capped.

== 1990-2011 ==
After several years of lagging performance, the Ivorian economy began a comeback in 1994, due to the devaluation of the CFA franc and improved prices for cocoa and coffee, growth in non-traditional primary exports such as pineapples and rubber, limited trade and banking liberalization, offshore oil and gas discoveries, and generous external financing and debt rescheduling by multilateral lenders and France. The 50% devaluation of franc zone currencies on 12 January 1994 caused a one-time jump in the inflation rate to 26% in 1994, but the rate fell sharply in 1996–1999. Moreover, government adherence to donor-mandated reforms led to a jump in growth to 5% annually in 1996–99.

In 1999, a coup d'état triggered a series of political crises and armed conflicts lasting until 2011, which disrupted the country's economy.

== 2011-present ==
After the end of the 2011 political crisis, Côte d'Ivoire's economy rebounded sharply, resulting in an average of over 8 percent economic growth from 2012 to 2017. This positive outlook was underpinned by an improved political environment and stable inflation.

== See also ==
- Agriculture in Ivory Coast (history section)

== Works cited ==
- Handloff, Robert Earl, ed. (1988). Cote d'Ivoire: a country study. Washington, D.C.: Federal Research Division, Library of Congress. OCLC 44238009. This article incorporates text from this source, which is in the public domain.
