= Mont-Korhogo =

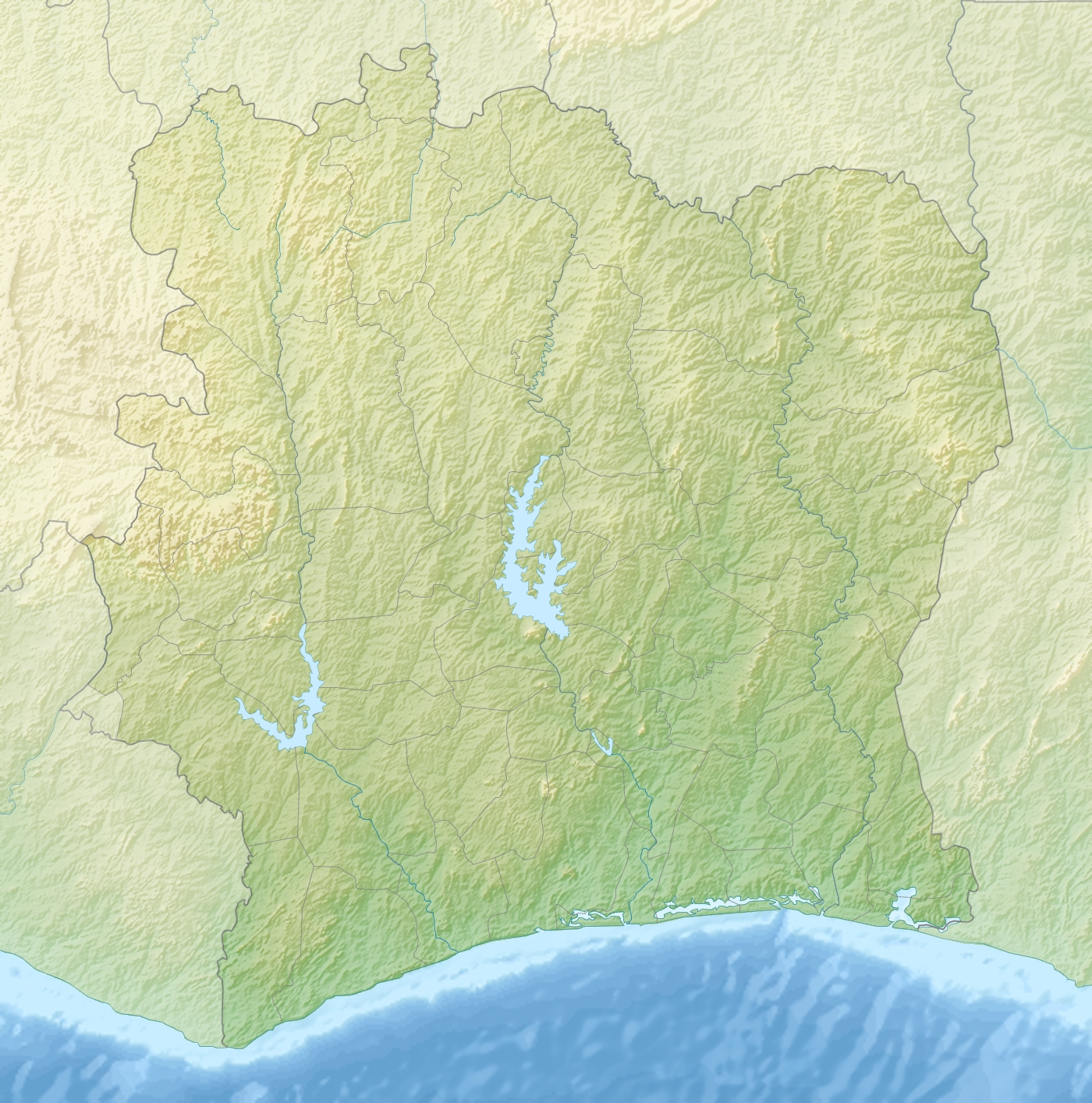
- Location within Ivory Coast

Highest point
- Elevation: 567 m (1,860 ft)
- Coordinates: 9°27′N 5°39′W

Mont-Korhogo is a small mountain in northern Ivory Coast. It is located in the southwest quarter of the city of Korhogo, Poro Region, Savanes District.

Mont-Korhogo was the name of a commune of Ivory Coast until March 2012, when it became one of 1,126 communes nationwide that were abolished. The commune encompassed the portion of Korhogo that surrounded it as well as some nearby villages.
