= Massafoavogo-Fapaha =

- Village
- Location in Ivory Coast
- Coordinates: 9°29′N 5°50′W
- Country: Ivory Coast
- District: Savanes
- Region: Poro
- Department: Korhogo
- Sub-prefecture: Korhogo
- Time zone: UTC+0 (GMT)

Massafoavogo-Fapaha is a village in northern Ivory Coast. It is in the sub-prefecture of Korhogo, Korhogo Department, Poro Region, Savanes District.

Until 2012, Massafoavogo-Fapaha was in the commune of Fapaha-M'Binguébougou. In March 2012, Fapaha-M'Binguébougou became one of 1,126 communes nationwide that were abolished. M'Binguébougou is the name of a village nearby to Massafoavogo-Fapaha.
