= Bouaké Airport =

Airport in Bouaké, Ivory Coast

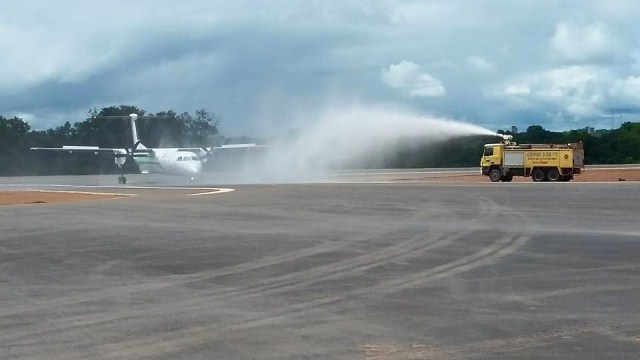
- IATA: BYK; ICAO: DIBK

Summary
- Airport type: Military/Public
- Location: Bouaké
- Elevation AMSL: 1,231 ft / 375 m
- Coordinates: 7°44′20″N 5°4′25″W
- Interactive map of Bouaké Airport

Runways
Direction	Length		Surface
Direction	ft	m	Surface
03/21	10,827	3,300	Asphalt

Bouaké Airport (IATA: BYK, ICAO: DIBK) is an airport located in Bouaké, the second largest city in Côte d'Ivoire.

== Airlines and destinations ==
Airlines	Destinations
Air Côte d'Ivoire	Abidjan, Bamako

== June 29, 2007 assassination attempt on Guillaume Soro ==
On June 29, 2007, Guillaume Soro, the prime minister of Côte d'Ivoire, was targeted by rocket and Kalashnikov fire upon his landing at the Bouaké Airport. Four people were killed and ten others were wounded.
