= Man Airport =

Airport in Ivory Coast

- IATA: MJC; ICAO: DIMN

Summary
- Airport type: Public
- Serves: Man
- Elevation AMSL: 1,089 ft / 332 m
- Coordinates: 7°16′20″N 7°35′15″W

Map

Runways
Direction	Length		Surface
Direction	ft	m	Surface
03/21	6,888	2,100	Asphalt
- Source: Google Maps

Man Airport (IATA: MJC, ICAO: DIMN) is an airport serving Man, Côte d'Ivoire.

== Airlines and destinations ==
Airlines	Destinations
Air Côte d'Ivoire	Abidjan, Odienné

== See also ==
- Transport in Côte d'Ivoire
