= Air Ivoire =

National airline of Ivory Coast (1960–2011)

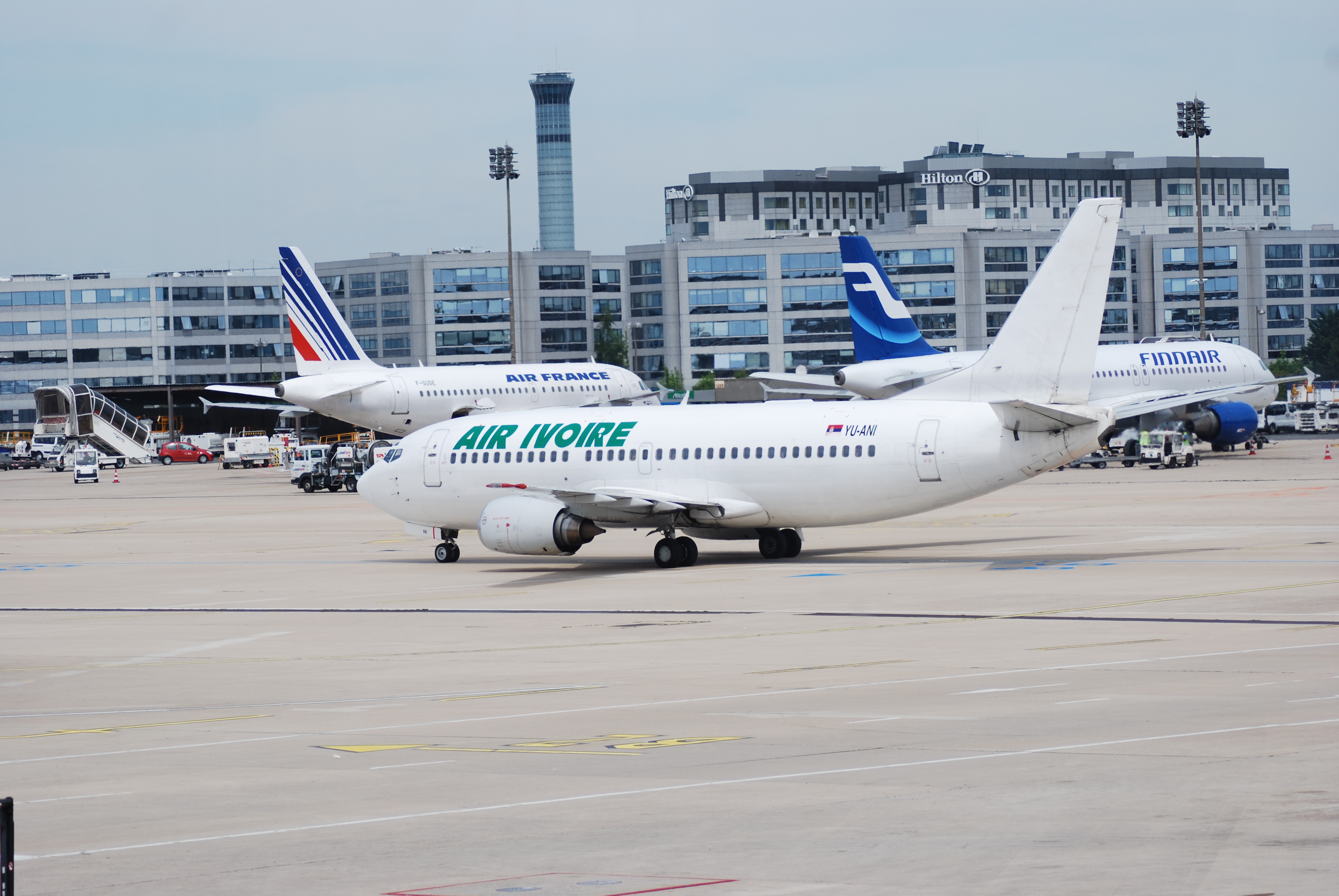
- Air Ivoire Boeing 737
IATA	ICAO	Call sign
VU	VUN	AIRIVOIRE
- Founded: 14 December 1960
- Commenced operations: August 1964
- Ceased operations: 2011
- Hubs: Port Bouet Airport
- Frequent-flyer program: Ivoire Plus
- Fleet size: 5
- Destinations: 14
- Headquarters: Abidjan, Ivory Coast
- Key people: Hanns Marienfeld (CEO)

Air Ivoire was an Ivorian airline that served as the flag carrier of the Ivory Coast from its founding in 1960 until its dissolution due to bankruptcy in 2011, being replaced by its successor, Air Côte d'Ivoire. The airline was headquartered in Abidjan.

At its final form before dissolving, Air Ivoire operated a total of five aircraft which served on routes to 14 destinations across Africa. Its main hub was at Félix-Houphouët-Boigny International Airport in Abidjan.

== History ==
The airline was established on 14 December 1960 and started operations in August 1964. Sodetraf, UTA and Air Afrique held an interest in the airline until January 1976, when the government of the Ivory Coast acquired and nationalized the airline. Initially known as Air Ivoire, the airline suspended operations in September 1999 due to financial difficulties. After being acquired by AAA, owned 51% by Air France and AIG, the company changed its name to Nouvelle Air Ivoire and resumed operations in 2001. The airline reverted to its original title before its dissoultion.

According to the company website, after an increase in the airline's company, and a repurchase by the government, Air Ivoire reverted to government control. On 15 October 2008, the private Groupe Atlantique took a 51% shareholding, with the Government of Ivory Coast retaining 49%.

Air Ivoire finalized a substantial fleet modernization process in the second half of 2009, whereby its Fokker F28 were replaced by three Boeing 737s forming the backbone of its regional network. All aircraft were maintained as per Ivorian and European standards (EU-OPS).

== Fleet ==
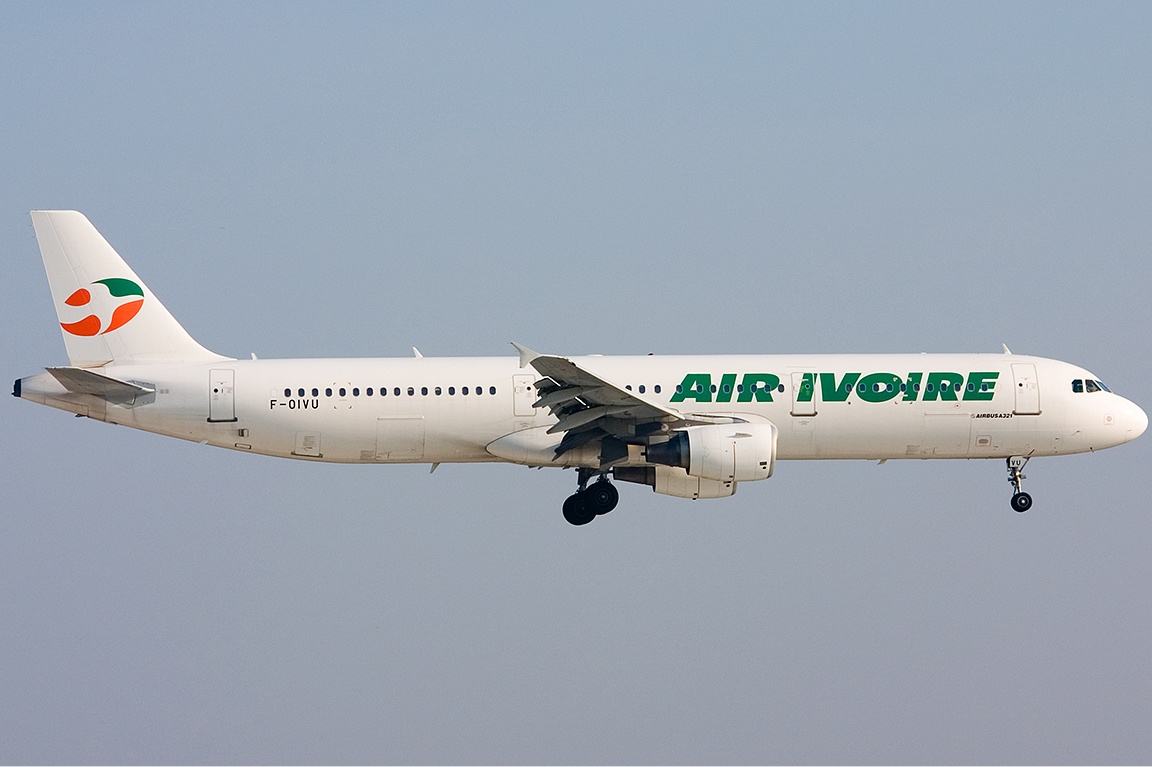
Air Ivoire Airbus A321 at Paris-Orly Airport

The Air Ivoire fleet included the following aircraft (as of August 2012):

- 1 Airbus A321
- 4 Boeing 737-500

== See also ==
- List of defunct airlines of Côte d'Ivoire
