= San Pédro Airport =

Airport in Ivory Coast

- IATA: SPY; ICAO: DISP

Summary
- Airport type: Public
- Serves: San Pédro
- Elevation AMSL: 26 ft / 8 m
- Coordinates: 4°44′48″N 6°39′40″W

Map

Runways
Direction	Length		Surface
Direction	ft	m	Surface
03/21	5,705	1,800	Asphalt
- Source: Google Maps WAD

San Pédro Airport (IATA: SPY, ICAO: DISP) is an airport serving San Pédro, Côte d'Ivoire.

== Airlines and destinations ==
Airlines	Destinations
Air Côte d'Ivoire	Abidjan

== See also ==
- Transport in Côte d'Ivoire
