= Félix-Houphouët-Boigny International Airport =

International airport serving Abidjan, Ivory Coast

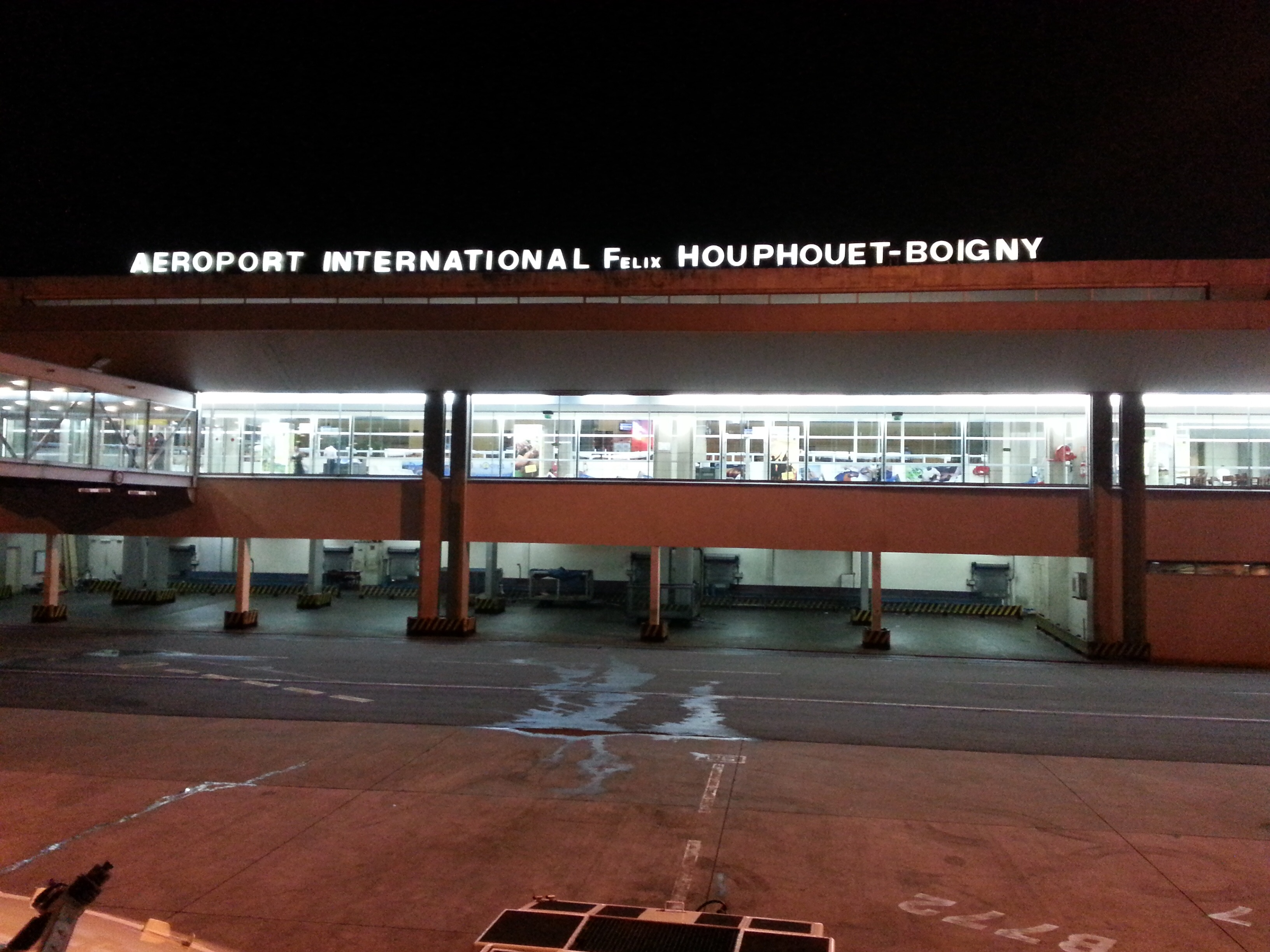
- IATA: ABJ; ICAO: DIAP

Summary
- Airport type: Military / Public
- Serves: Abidjan
- Location: Port-Bouët, Ivory Coast
- Hub for: Air Côte d'Ivoire
- Elevation AMSL: 29 m (95 ft)
- Coordinates: 5°15′41.1″N 003°55′32.8″W
- Website: aeria-ci.com

Map
- Location within Ivory Coast Location within Africa

Runways
Direction	Length		Surface
Direction	m	ft	Surface
03/21	3,000	9,842	Macadam

Statistics (2025)
- Passengers: 2,520,594
- Passenger change 24–25: ▲ +0.9%

Félix-Houphouët-Boigny International Airport (IATA: ABJ, ICAO: DIAP), also known as Port Bouët Airport, is located 16 km (9 nmi; 10 mi) south east of Abidjan, Ivory Coast. It is the largest airport in the country for air traffic. The airport is the main hub of the national airline Air Côte d'Ivoire. Named after the first president of Ivory Coast, Félix Houphouët-Boigny (1905–1993), this international airport is directly connected currently to airports in Europe and to many destinations within the rest of Africa and the Middle East. The airport is served by 21 airlines, covering more than 30 destinations.

== History ==
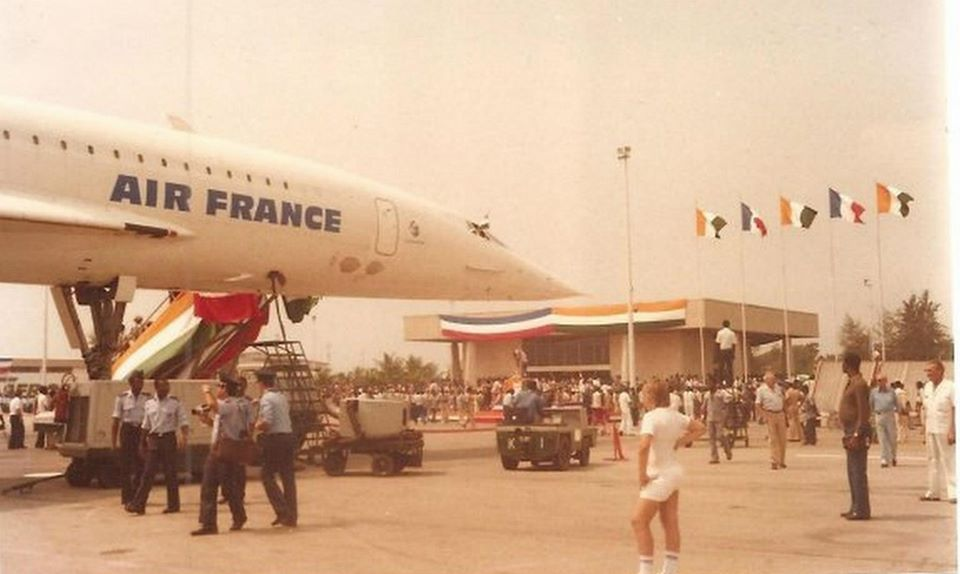
Concorde at Abidjan Airport, 1978

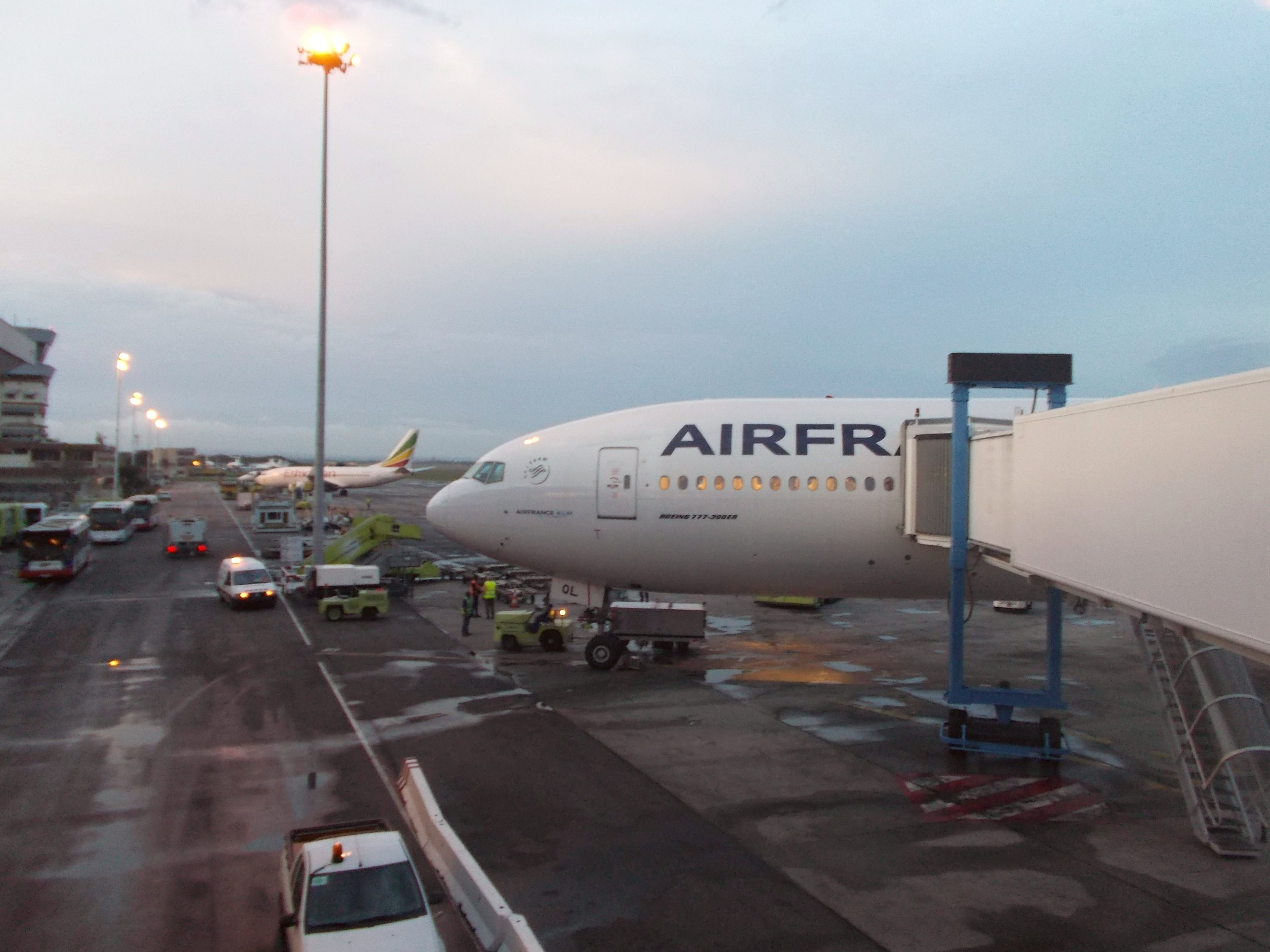
View of the apron, 2012

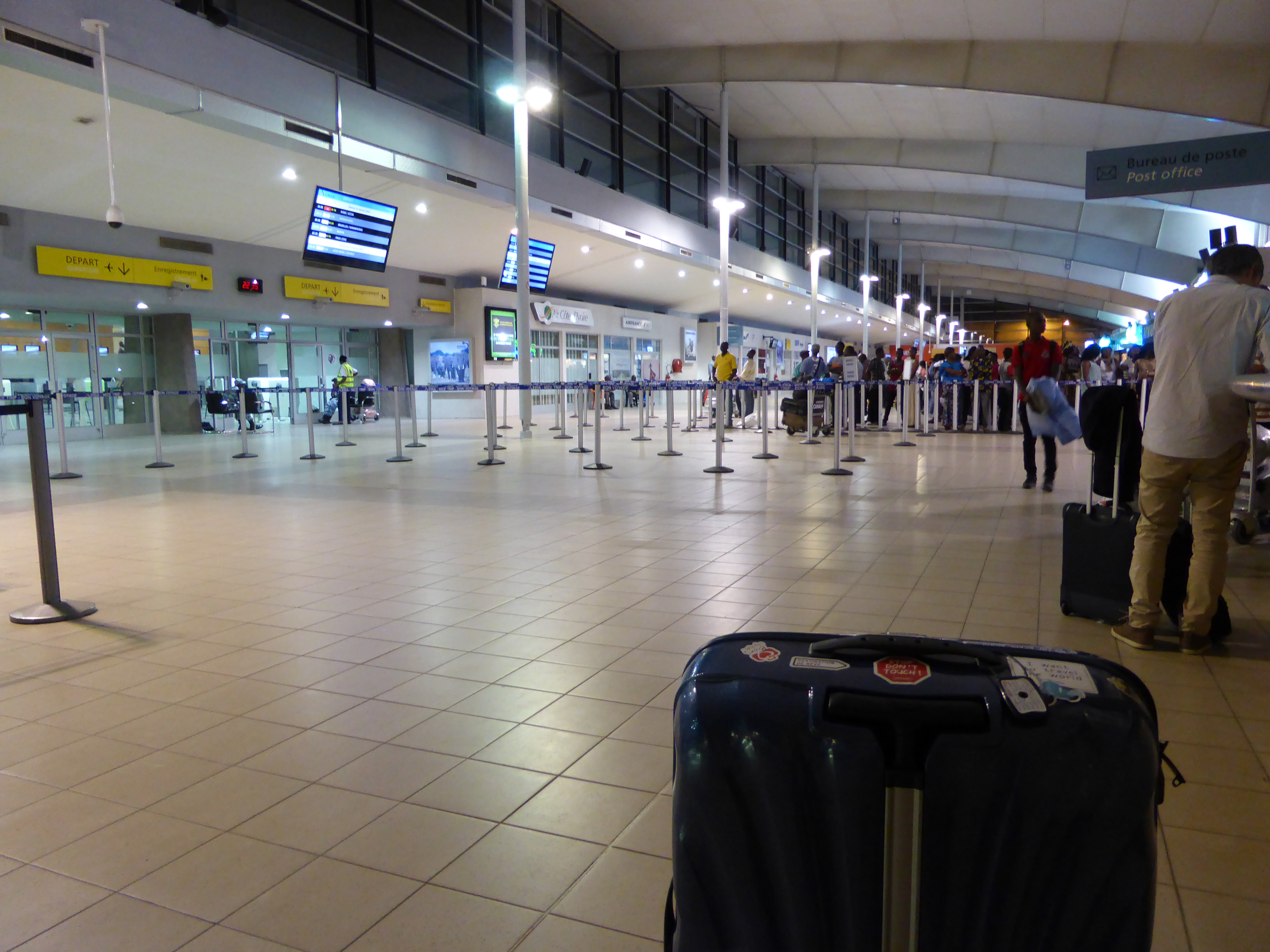
Check-in area

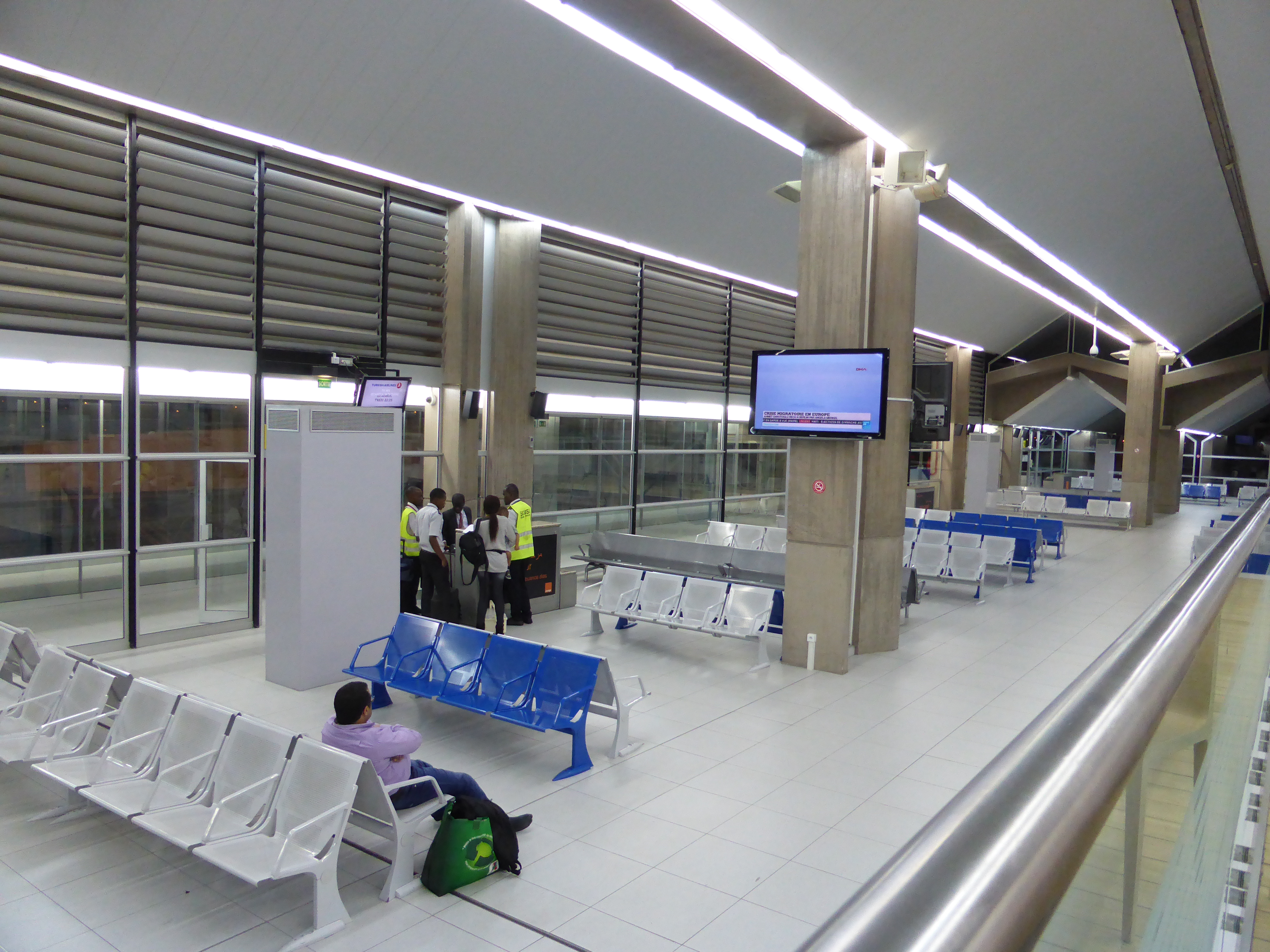
Departure gates

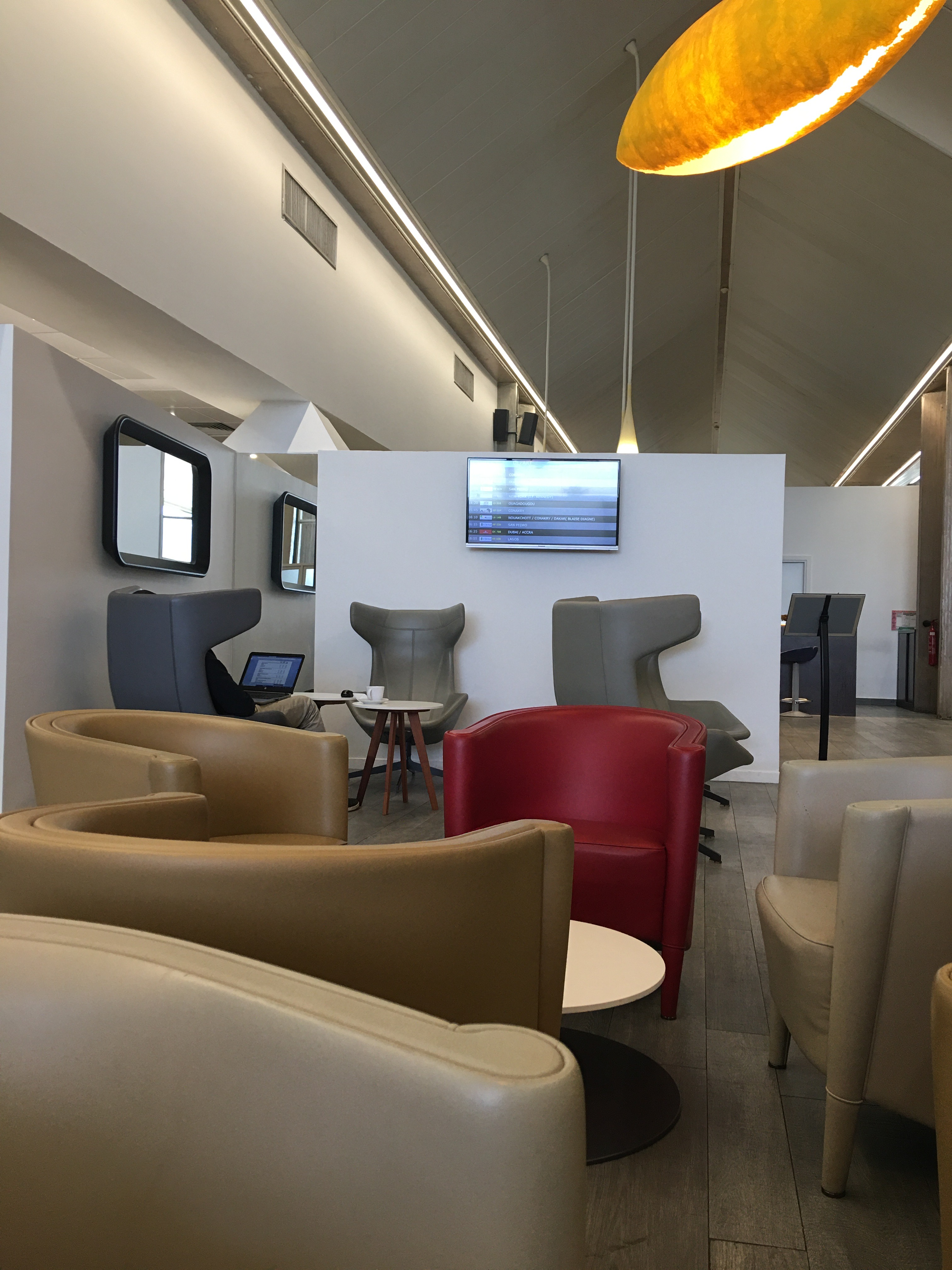
Business lounge

The airport is managed by Aeria, a private Ivorian company. It is also a strategic piece of infrastructure for both the delivery of military equipment and, in times of unrest, the evacuation of foreign nationals.

Air Afrique, which was based in Abidjan, ceased all flights in January 2002. Disturbances that took place in Ivory Coast in the early 2000s had a negative impact on the airport. In November 2004, during the French–Ivorian clashes that occurred in Abidjan, the airport was looted and damaged. It was taken back by French troops and returned to the Ivorian government in the second half of November. The airport was later refurbished by the Ivorian government and modernized with new modern facilities.

On the night of 2 to 3 April 2011, the airport was again taken by the French troops in order to evacuate French nationals and foreigners, as the final assault against the presidential palace was announced, during the battle for Abidjan. After the civil war ended in April 2011, the airport was returned to the Ivorian government and development projects, paused for almost a decade, were restarted.

Following the gradual recovery of economic activities in Ivory Coast from 2012, investments and projects to increase the capacity of the airport, provided in March 2010, are in the works since October 2011.

In February 2012, Abdoulaye Coulibaly, president of Aeria's board of directors, indicated that he wanted to make the airport suitable for the Airbus A380. Air France did not deny that it could eventually use the A380 on the Paris-Abidjan route if there were sufficiently strong economic growth.

On 4 May 2012, PROPARCO loans ten billion CFA francs (€15 million) to Aeria to fund a major expansion and modernization program for the airport. This loan is part of the renewal of Aeria's concession, effective 1 January 2010, for a period of twenty years. This concession provides investment programs in increments of five years. The first slice of US$24 million, includes the renovation of the international terminal, the rehabilitation of the charter terminal and development of new infrastructure.

In addition, the refurbishment included an extension of the international terminal of a surface 11,000 to 26,000 m^{2} (120,000 to 280,000 sq ft), the refurbishment of the aircraft parking area, renovation of access roads and the construction of a new parking lot. The ultimate goal is to create a commercial zone next to the airport, with a lodging area, hangars, a convention center, a free zone, office buildings, warehouses, exhibition halls, a shopping center and housing for dedicated staff. On 16 June 2012, the Radisson Hotels group announced the laying of the first stone of the Radisson Blu hotel on the airport grounds. The Radisson Blu opened in the spring of 2016 and has over 200 rooms and suites, as well as a restaurant, outdoor pool and fitness center. Also on the airport grounds, ONOMO Hotels operates a 118-room select-service property. Both the ONOMO and the Radisson Blu are accessible from the passenger terminal via shuttle buses.

Ethiopian Airlines commenced direct flights to Newark aboard Boeing 787s in May 2018. The route was the product of negotiations between Ethiopian and the Ivorian government. The company signed a codeshare agreement with Air Côte d'Ivoire to attract passengers. Two months later, Ethiopian suspended its link to Newark because of the COVID-19 pandemic. In June 2023, the carrier began service to New York City.

In January 2020, tens of thousands were left homeless as homes in Adjoufou, a shanty town near the airport, were demolished, officially for safety reasons. Residents said they were targeted because they are poor.

== Airlines and destinations ==
=== Passenger ===
Airlines	Destinations
Air Algérie	Algiers, Ouagadougou
Air Burkina	Accra, Bobo-Dioulasso, Ouagadougou
Air Côte d'Ivoire	Abuja, Accra, Bamako, Bissau, Bouaké, Brazzaville, Conakry, Cotonou, Casablanca, Dakar–Diass, Douala, Kinshasa–N'djili, Korhogo, Lagos, Libreville, Lomé, Man, Monrovia–Roberts, Niamey, Odienné, Ouagadougou, Paris–Charles de Gaulle, Pointe-Noire, San Pédro, Yaoundé; Seasonal: Beirut
Air France	Paris–Charles de Gaulle
Air Peace	Lagos
Air Senegal	Dakar–Diass
ASKY Airlines	Lomé
Brussels Airlines	Accra, Brussels, Cotonou, Ouagadougou
Corsair International	Paris–Orly
Egyptair	Cairo
Emirates	Accra, Dubai–International
Ethiopian Airlines	Addis Ababa, Conakry, New York–JFK
Kenya Airways	Nairobi–Jomo Kenyatta
Mauritania Airlines	Bamako, Nouakchott
Middle East Airlines	Beirut, Lagos
Qatar Airways	Accra, Doha
Royal Air Maroc	Casablanca
Sky Mali	Bamako
South African Airways	Accra, Johannesburg–O. R. Tambo
TAAG Angola Airlines	Luanda–Agostinho Neto
Tunisair	Niamey, Ouagadougou, Tunis
Turkish Airlines	Cotonou, Istanbul

=== Cargo ===
Airlines	Destinations
Cargolux	Accra
Ethiopian Cargo	Addis Ababa, Libreville, Liege
Swiftair	Accra, Lagos

== Statistics ==
Before the decade of political and military turmoil, the Felix-Houphouet-Boigny airport was among the most important in West Africa, with passenger traffic exceeding one million travelers in the late 1990s. The succession of political and military crises seriously affected the country's image and reduced the importance of the airport in the sub-region in terms of traffic; but in recent years, as stability and strong economic growth have returned, airport traffic has been growing at a fast pace, and is now at its highest ever. In 2023, the airport handled 2,331,917 passengers.

Number of air passengers per year
1998	1999	2000	2004	2009	2010	2011	2012	2013
1,253,000*	1,250,000	1,083,000	700,000	900,000	1,000,000	640,000	961,643	1,178,362
2015	2016	2017	2018	2019	2020	2021	2022	2023
1,560,000	1,829,000	2,070,000	2,187,868	2,271,700	935,130	1,647,832	2,091,355	2,331,917

== Ground transport ==
The airport is to be served by the new Abidjan Metro, construction of which started in 2018. The metro should enter commercial service in 2027.

== Accidents and incidents ==
- 12 July 1972: an Italian living in the Ivory Coast took his wife and son hostage and boarded an unknown UTA plane here, demanding to be flown to Italy. A gun battle broke out with police officers in which he shot and injured his wife; he was later apprehended. He was in a custody battle for his child due to marital issues.
- 25 July 1977: a MBB HFB-320 Hansa Jet (5N-AMF) owned by Motor Parts Manuf. was on approach during an executive flight and struck the sea 500 m off of runway 03, killing all 3 occupants. The crew did not have a flight plan.
- 3 January 1987: a Varig Boeing 707-379C registration PP-VJK operating flight 797 from Abidjan to Rio de Janeiro-Galeão crashed due to a failure on engine 1 shortly after take-off. While attempting to return to the airport for an emergency landing, it crashed on a field 18 km away from Abidjan's airport. Of the 51 passengers and crew aboard, a single passenger survived.
- 15 January 1993: a Boeing 707-321C (YR-ABM) on cargo route Air Afrique Flight 153 (Cotonou-Abidjan) undershot runway 21 by 30 m after an ILS approach, causing the main landing gear to collapse. The plane was written off; all 6 occupants survived.
- 26 June 1994: a Fokker F-27 Friendship 400M (TU-TIP) on passenger route Air Ivoire Flight 777 (San Pedro-Abidjan) crashed into a wooded area 3 nm (3.45 miles) short of the runway at 19:40 with flaps and undercarriage still retracted, killing all 17 occupants.
- 12 April 1997: a McDonnell Douglas DC-9-51 (9G-ACM) on passenger route Ghana Airways Flight 560 (Accra-Abidjan) veered to the left and ran off the side of the runway on its second landing attempt in heavy rainfall and poor visibility, causing the undercarriage to collapse. The plane was written off; all 104 occupants survived.
- 26 June 1998: a Beechcraft 200 Super King Air (ZS-MSL) of the UN leased from Federal Aviation crashed on approach from Lome at 19:45, killing all 7 occupants. The flight was executive.
- 30 January 2000: Kenya Airways flight 431, crashed into the sea shortly after take-off from Port Bouet. Of the 179 passengers and crew on board the Airbus A310, only ten people survived.
- 14 October 2017: an Antonov An-26-100 (ER-AVB) on cargo route Valan International Cargo Charter Flight 26 (Ouagadougou-Abidjan) crashed in the sea on approach 0.8 km (0.5 miles) south of the airport, killing 4 of the 10 occupants. The crash was found to have been caused by underestimation of weather, lack of knowledge about Abidjan, and inadequate instrument monitoring.
