= Korhogo Airport =

Airport in Ivory Coast

- IATA: HGO; ICAO: DIKO

Summary
- Airport type: Public
- Serves: Korhogo
- Elevation AMSL: 1,214 ft / 370 m
- Coordinates: 9°23′14″N 5°33′24″W

Map

Runways
Direction	Length		Surface
Direction	ft	m	Surface
09/27	6,888	2,100	Asphalt
- Source: Google Maps

Korhogo Airport (IATA: HGO, ICAO: DIKO) is an airport serving Korhogo, Côte d'Ivoire. It is the country's fifth biggest airport.

== Airlines and destinations ==
Airlines	Destinations
Air Côte d'Ivoire	Abidjan

== See also ==
- Transport in Côte d'Ivoire
