= Agriculture in Ivory Coast =

Economic sector in Ivory Coast

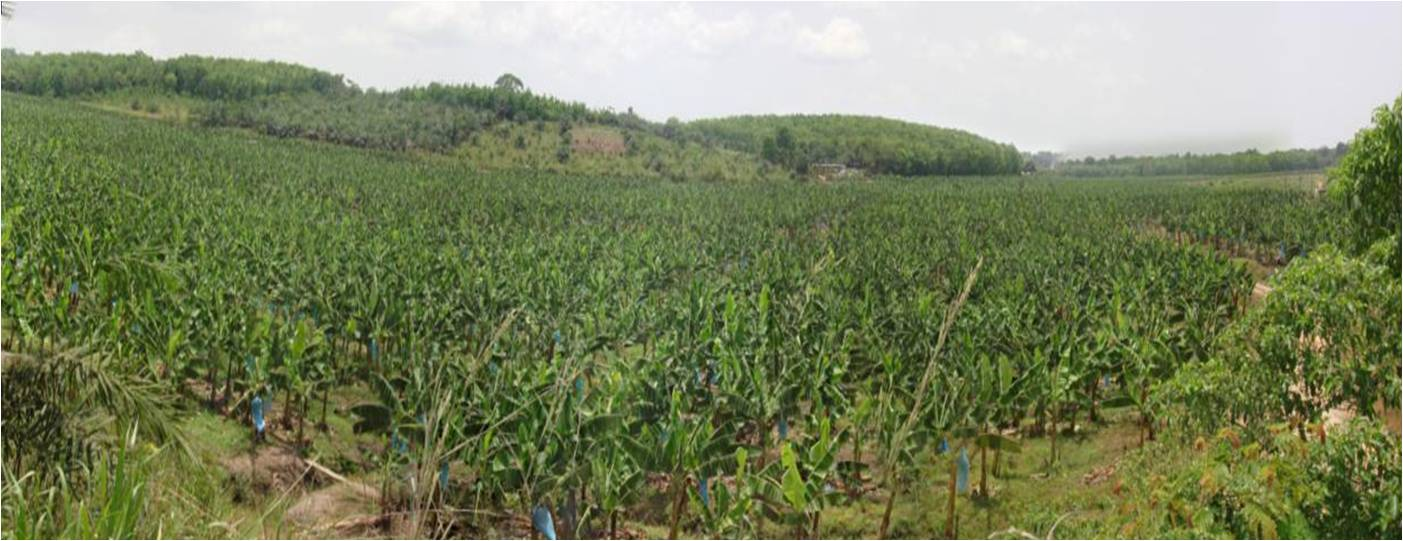
A banana plantation in Ivory Coast

Agriculture was the foundation of the economy in Ivory Coast and its main source of growth. In 1987 the agricultural sector contributed 35 percent of the country's GDP and 66 percent of its export revenues, provided employment for about two-thirds of the national work force, and generated substantial revenues despite the drop in coffee and cocoa prices. From 1965 to 1980, agricultural GDP grew by an average 4.6 percent per year. Growth of agricultural GDP from coffee, cocoa, and timber production, which totaled nearly 50 percent of Ivory Coast's export revenues, averaged 7 percent a year from 1965 to 1980.

In Ivory Coast more than 60% of the land is agricultural and therefore their economy's foundation is mostly based on their agriculture. Fifty-five percent of their income come from exports of cocoa and coffee which are both agricultural products.

Contributing to this performance were an abundance of fertile land, cheap labor, the collective efforts of many farmers cultivating small plots, relatively favorable commodity prices, and a stable political environment.

== History ==
Earlier in the 1880s and 1890s, the French had conquered and ruled most territories in West Africa and managed them either under the ruling of Senegal or as individual regions. In 1895, the Colonial Ministry in Paris launched a plan to establish the Afrique Occidentale Française (AOF) or the Federation of French West Africa in order to decentralize French authoritative power into Africa so that proper political decisions could be made based on the local modalities. Also, they launched a development project along with the establishment of AOF, named mise en valeur — “rational economic development”, to level up African living standards and fulfill the French imperial needs. A series of actions were executed, including developments in areas of economic trade and market, transportation and communication, African civilians’ legal rights opportunities, and elite projects for the intelligence input into Europe. This Federation of French West Africa included 8 countries: Mauritania, Senegal, Ivory Coast, Guinea, Burkina Faso, Mali, Niger, and Benin.

In order to develop the trade market between Africa and France, and to make AOF as self-supporting territories with returning profits, the same as other preindustrial societies, the French government started with AOF's agricultural development. Not only solving up civilians’ basic food crises, but agricultural surplus could help produce other products and commodities, which facilitates trade and market to flow and function. For example, the yearly massive production of peanuts in West Africa back in the 1980s had reached 5,288,000 metric tons. Due to the huge consumer needs in the United States, they were transported and traded into cities of New York and Boston for direct sale. Meanwhile, such mass production of peanuts was also exported to metropolitan industrial European countries, such as Marseilles and Bordeaux, where they were transformed into soap, wax, and other industrial commodities. As a trade return, some manufactured products were also sold back into West Africa, such as textiles, salt, iron, tobacco, and guns.

However, only a few regions of AOF were qualified to be actively engaged in such cash-corp trade. Preparatory agricultural development in Africa required countries with geographical advantages for crop plantation, opportunities with the exploitation of irrigation systems, coastal benefits for transportation and telecommunication, and the Ivory Coast, also as the Republic of Côte d'Ivoire, was one of the few with these advantages and opportunities. The president of Ivory Coast seized the opportunity with the funds and technical guidance provided by France to develop their agricultural and industrial sectors by exporting products: “The Ivory Coast has had policies focused on the development of agriculture, with much attention to peasant agriculture and the export sector has been regarded as the main source of growth.”

Firstly, Ivory Coast was geographically suitable for the growth of certain grains such as peanuts, palm-oil, and kernels. Ivory Coast is located on the Gulf of Guinea, between the countries of Liberia and Ghana, with a land area reaching 322,463 kilometers. The Gulf of Guinea is a coastal region situated by the Atlantic Ocean, and its river outlets had drained through almost all West African territories. Small rivers like Sasandra, Bandama, and Comoé are the main outlets from the Niger River that flowed through Ivory Coast. Meanwhile, because West Africa is under the tropical climate with frequent rainy seasons (twice a year), the tropical water over Ivory Coast is of relatively low salinity compared to normal coastal areas. Along with the warm temperature in West Africa, although a rainforest was in the south part of Ivory Coast, which limited the potential agricultural planting area, however, the north part of Ivory Coast were areas with woodlands or savannah, providing fertile soil for crops like peanuts and palm kernels to grow.

Despite the natural geographical advantage of Ivory Coast, the irrigation systems invested by the French government over the Niger Valley had boosted the production of cash-corps as well. The irrigation concept of building dams and systems of irrigation canals was first brought up in Niger Valley in 1918 when cotton was in high demand after World War I. A consortium was convinced that investing in the irrigation system could help turn Western Sudan into a vast cotton plantation and sufficient lower-price cotton products could be imported into France. On March 15, 1924, a policy was carried out by the Governor General of Jules Cardeto to implement the long-term scheme on Niger irrigation systems. Labourers were forced to dig ditches, canal systems and dams to set barrages across rivers and canals to control the flowing direction of the water. Meanwhile, in 1932, the Office du Niger was established as an autonomous department managing the construction of the irrigation system and the settlement of labourers and farmers. The construction of the irrigation system was designed and carried out all by the Office du Niger itself, as Wilde says, “Rather than letting all the administrative services of the French Sudan contribute, each according to its own competence, the Office du Niger became progressively more or less sovereign within the limits of its territory.” Although the Niger project failed due to insufficient labourers in that region, the funds and existing irrigation system still beneficially facilitate the crop production for areas as Ivory Coast and other Niger regions.

Another factor leading to the success of agriculture in Ivory Coast is the development of transportation and telecommunication. After the Industrial Revolution, the French government proposed to bring more advanced techniques into West Africa to facilitate exportations. Roads, railways, and harbors were constructed and telecommunication was reformed. First of all, the Ivory Coast has one of the most prosperous harbors in Western Africa—Abidjan, the capital city of Ivory Coast, also named as “Pearl of the lagoons”. Basically all administrative offices were set in Abidjan, and it was the major stopover place for cash-corp products to be exported to France and where all returned manufactured goods were imported. At the same time, there existed a railway across the southern rainforests and Abidjan was located by savannah, which was the main area for crop production. This railway had reduced a great amount of time for interior commodities transportation. For public telecommunications, international development organizations and NGOs, such as the World Bank, pushed corporatization and privatization for public telecommunications operators in Africa by linking loans to sectors reforming PTTs (Post, Telephone, and Telegraph), helping West African countries to restructure their telecommunications and thus, with commands and instructions being delivered more timely, the cash-corp trade and market became more transparent and efficient.

The Ivory Coast's Gross Domestic Product (GDP) increased at a rate of 7.5% annually during the beginning of the agricultural development era.

Success in the 1960s and 1970s, however, overshadowed major problems developing in the agricultural sector. By the late 1980s, despite efforts to diversify its crops, 55 percent of Ivory Coast's export earnings still came from cocoa and coffee. Moreover, highly volatile world markets for both commodities caused sharp fluctuations in government revenues and made development planning difficult. In addition, Ivory Coast was not yet self-sufficient in food production and imported substantial quantities of rice, wheat, fish, and red meat. Finally, despite an enormous increase in the volume of agricultural output since independence, there was little improvement in agricultural productivity. To achieve higher production figures, traditional farmers using traditional technologies simply cleared more and more land.

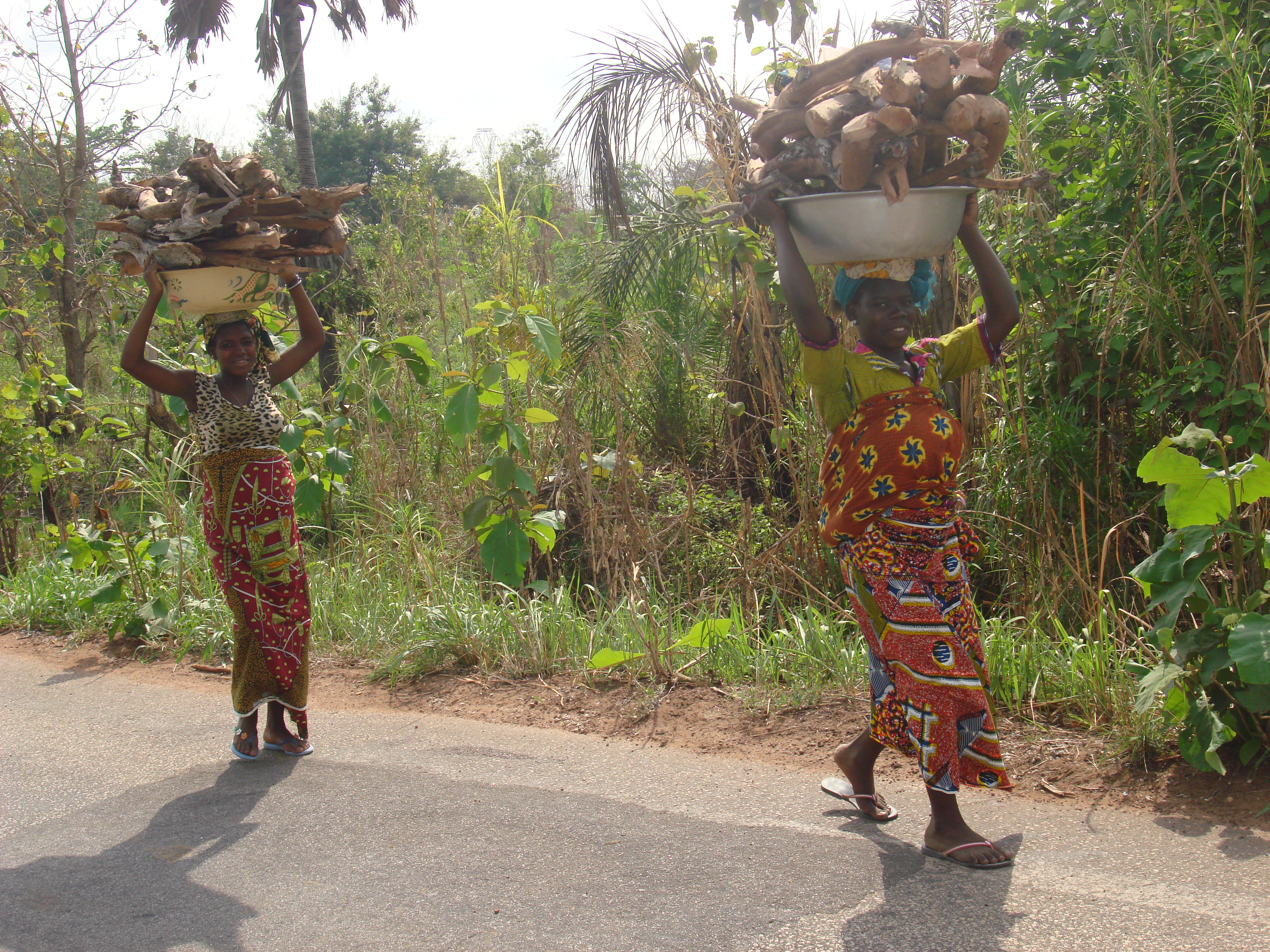
A rural scene in Ivory Coast

To overcome Ivory Coast's excessive dependence on coffee and cocoa (the prices for which were set by consumers), on timber (the supply of which was nearly exhausted), and on imported food, the government in the mid-1970s embarked on a series of agricultural diversification and regional development projects with the hope of boosting agricultural production by 4 percent per year. The plan, estimated to cost CFA F100 billion per annum (with just over 50 percent coming from foreign lenders) would allow the country to become self-sufficient in food (with the exception of wheat) and expand the production of rubber, cotton, sugar, bananas, pineapples, and tropical oils.

In spite of these efforts, the agricultural sector appeared unable to adapt to changing conditions. Distortions in the system of incentives reduced the comparative advantage of alternative crops. The vast revenues collected by the CSSPPA were often spent on marginally profitable investments, like the costly sugar complexes or expensive land clearing programs. Finally, some diversification crops, like coconut and palm oil, faced new threats as health-conscious consumers in the United States and Europe began turning away from tropical oils. Consequently, the future for Ivorian agriculture was uncertain.

== Production ==
Ivory Coast produced, in 2018:

- 7.2 million tonnes of yam (3rd largest producer in the world, only behind Nigeria and Ghana);
- 5 million tons of cassava (14th largest producer in the world);
- 2.1 million tons of palm oil;
- 2.1 million tons of rice;
- 1.9 million tons of cocoa (largest producer in the world);
- 1.9 million tons of sugar cane;
- 1.8 million tons of plantain (8th largest producer in the world);
- 1 million tons of maize;
- 688 thousand tons of cashew nuts (3rd largest producer in the world, behind Vietnam and India);
- 461 thousand tons of natural rubber;
- 397 thousand tons of banana;
- 316 thousand tons of cotton;

In addition to smaller productions of other agricultural products, like coffee (88 thousand tons) and pineapple (50 thousand tons).

== See also ==
- Coffee production in Ivory Coast
