= Odienné Airport =

Airport in Denguélé, Ivory Coast

- IATA: KEO; ICAO: DIOD

Summary
- Airport type: Public
- Serves: Odienné
- Elevation AMSL: 1,373 ft / 418 m
- Coordinates: 9°32′20″N 7°33′40″W

Map

Runways
Direction	Length		Surface
Direction	ft	m	Surface
06/24	6,888	2,100	Asphalt
- Source: Google Maps

Odienné Airport (IATA: KEO, ICAO: DIOD) is an airport serving Odienné, Côte d'Ivoire.

== Airlines and destinations ==
Airlines	Destinations
Air Côte d'Ivoire	Abidjan, Man

== See also ==
- Transport in Côte d'Ivoire
