= Ivoirienne de Transports Aériens =

Ivorian airline

Ivoirienne de Transportes Aeriens (ITA) is a cargo airline in Côte d'Ivoire. It was founded in 2007.

== Fleet ==
The Ivoirienne de Transports Aériens fleet consists of the following aircraft (as of August 2017):

Ivoirienne de Transports Aériens Fleet
Aircraft	In Service	Orders	Passengers	Notes
Boeing 727-200F	1	—		
Total	1			

== See also ==
- List of defunct airlines of Côte d'Ivoire
