= Korhogo =

- City, sub-prefecture, and commune
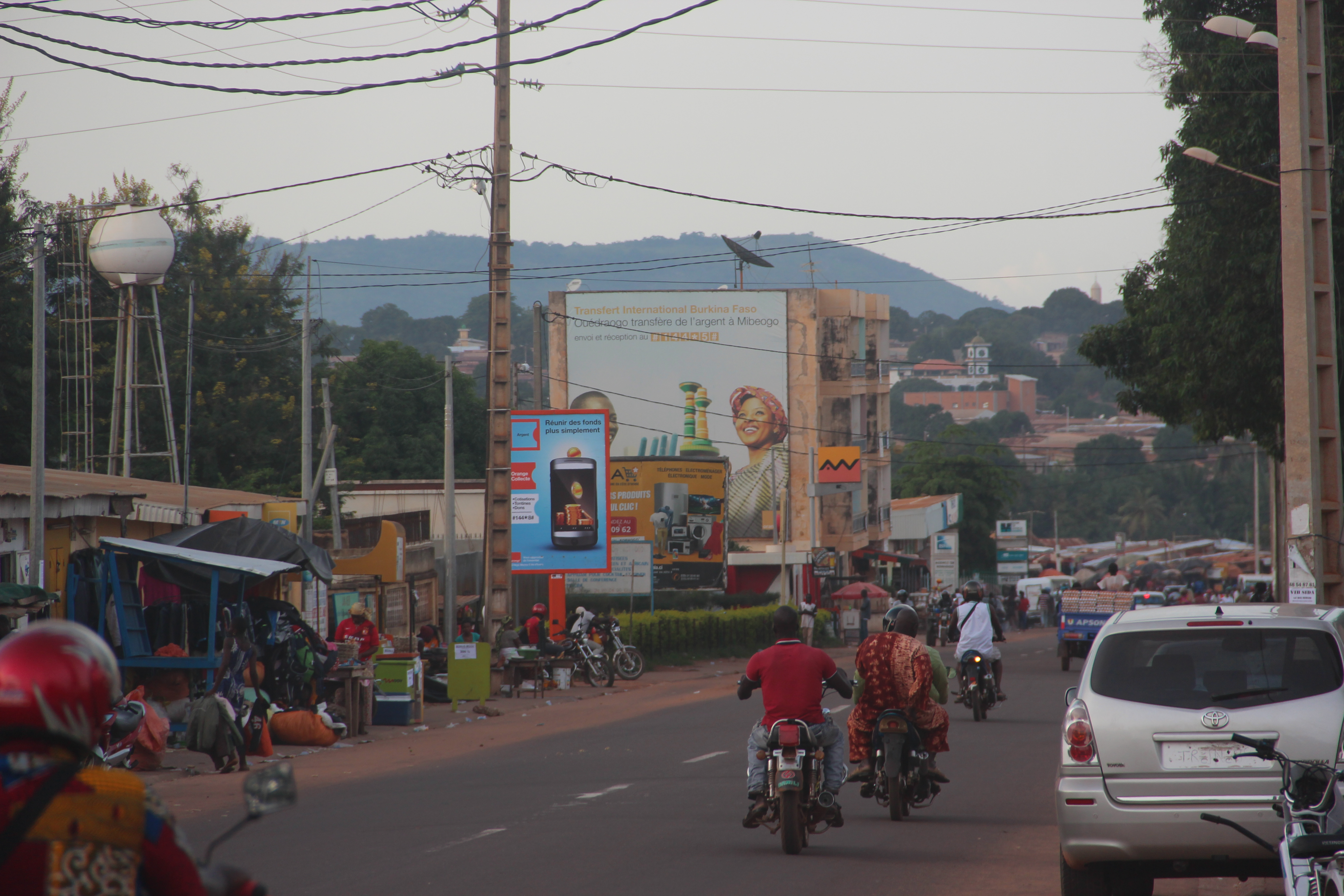
- City of Korhogo

- Location in Ivory Coast
- Coordinates: 9°25′N 5°37′W
- Country: Ivory Coast
- District: Savanes
- Regions: Poro
- Department: Korhogo

Area
  - Total: 620 km^{2} (240 sq mi)
- Elevation: 380 m (1,250 ft)

Population (2021 census)
  - Total: 440,926
  - Density: 710/km^{2} (1,800/sq mi)
  - City: 243,048
- (2014 census)
- Time zone: UTC+0 (GMT)

Korhogo (N'Ko: ߞߙߐߞߐ߫, Krokо̄) is a city in northern Ivory Coast. It is the seat of both Savanes District and Poro Region. It is also a commune and the seat of and a sub-prefecture of Korhogo Department. In the 2014 census, the city had a population of 243,048, making it the fourth-largest city in the country and the largest in northern Ivory Coast.

Korhogo produces goods such as cotton, kapok fibre, rice, millet, peanuts, corn, yams, sheep, goats and diamonds. The settlement was on an important pre-colonial trade route to the Atlantic coast. It is said to have been founded by Nangui, a 14th-century Senufo patriarch and still is the capital of the Senufo people.

Sights in Korhogo include the Péléforo Gbon Coulibaly Regional Museum and the woodcarvers' quarter. Korhogo is also home to an airport, a large market, a cinema, and a mosque.

Korhogo's average annual rainfall is 1,243 mm, with the rainiest months being May to October. Its average year-round temperature is 26.6 degrees Celsius, with the hottest months being February to April. Korhogo's airport (Korhogo Airport) has the International Air Transport Association code HGO and the International Civil Aviation Organization code DIKO. Its one runway is 2,100 metres (6,900 ft) long, and receives domestic flights only.

The southwest quarter of the city is dominated by Mont-Korhogo.

== History ==
Korhogo was founded in the early 18th century by Nanguin, a warrior of Seku Watara. His sister's descendant Zwakognon was chief in 1892, when the advancing army of Babemba Traore captured Sinématiali and forced him to give his son Gbon Coulibaly as a hostage in 1892. Two years later Zwakognon died in a plague, and Gbon returned from Sikasso to assume the chieftainship. By careful diplomacy he managed to keep the town from being sacked either by Samory Toure or the French.

=== Civil War ===
On 19 September 2002, Korhogo and Bouaké were seized by disaffected former soldiers, calling themselves "Patriotic Movement of Côte d'Ivoire" (Mouvement Patriotique de Côte d'Ivoire – MPCI), rebelling against the rule of President Laurent Gbagbo. The coup was allegedly led by Robert Guéï, the former military dictator overthrown in a popular uprising in 2000. Despite the formal cessation of hostilities between the government and rebels in 2003, Korhogo remains unstable, with continued fighting between rival political factions. In June 2004, forces loyal to rebel leader Guillaume Soro claimed that his Paris-based rival Ibrahim Coulibaly had attempted to assassinate Soro, leading to gun battles which left 22 dead in Korhogo. In August 2004, the United Nations' Ivorian mission announced that three mass graves, containing at least 99 bodies, had been discovered in the town.

On 29 November 2011, the Associated Press reported that Gbagbo had been placed under house arrest in Korhogo, awaiting extradition to The Hague to face charges at the International Criminal Court.

In 2014, the population of the sub-prefecture of Korhogo was 286,071.

== Villages ==
The 62 villages of the sub-prefecture of Korhogo and their population in 2014 are:

1. Bafimin (519)
2. Bounonkaha (186)
3. Djegbe (516)
4. Dokaha (1,986)
5. Gbaloho (387)
6. Gbelenavogo (76)
7. Gbonkaha (438)
8. Gbonzoro (364)
9. Gnanlerekaha Ou Gnalelekaha (552)
10. Gozanvogo (570)
11. Kafa (1,199)
12. Kafigue (62)
13. Kagnene (331)
14. Kahouovogo (89)
15. Kapa (129)
16. Kapele (1,400)
17. Kassienre (124)
18. Katchanwavogo Ou Katianavogo (110)
19. Kategue (435)
20. Katiofi (84)
21. Katoumoro (330)
22. Kodjodougou Ou Kouadiodougou (375)
23. Korhogo (243,048)
24. Koulokakaha (926)
25. Kpatrakaha (409)
26. Kpemanvogo (115)
27. Kpenanvogo Ou Nahoualavogo (125)
28. Lagninin Ou Lagnene (245)
29. Lakpolo (568)
30. Lanvira (117)
31. Lenivogo (116)
32. Louhoua (556)
33. Madinin (688)
34. Massafoavogo-Fapaha (2,641)
35. Meyereguevogo (352)
36. Nabremakaha (354)
37. Nagneneguekaha (207)
38. Nambongnonkaha (81)
39. Nangasseregue (1,036)
40. Nanourgokaha Ou Nadrogokaha (1,609)
41. Nenekri (769)
42. Niambelegue (130)
43. Niple (940)
44. Ounonvogo (140)
45. Pignon (1,406)
46. Seguele Ou Sehele (694)
47. Sekonkaha (50)
48. Takali (162)
49. Talian (583)
50. Tandiamavogo (331)
51. Tandiavogo (222)
52. Tchiolelevogo (428)
53. Tielivogo (1,059)
54. Tihovogo (309)
55. Torgokaha (1,191)
56. Waraniene (4,864)
57. Ziekaha (149)
58. Zienkolo (735)
59. Zondeleguevogo (140)
60. Zonguitakaha-Dioula (185)
61. Zonguitakaha-Senoufo (214)
62. Zoumene (1,060)

== See also ==
- Korhogo cloth
