= Martin Fofié Kouakou =

Ivorian military official (1968–2026)

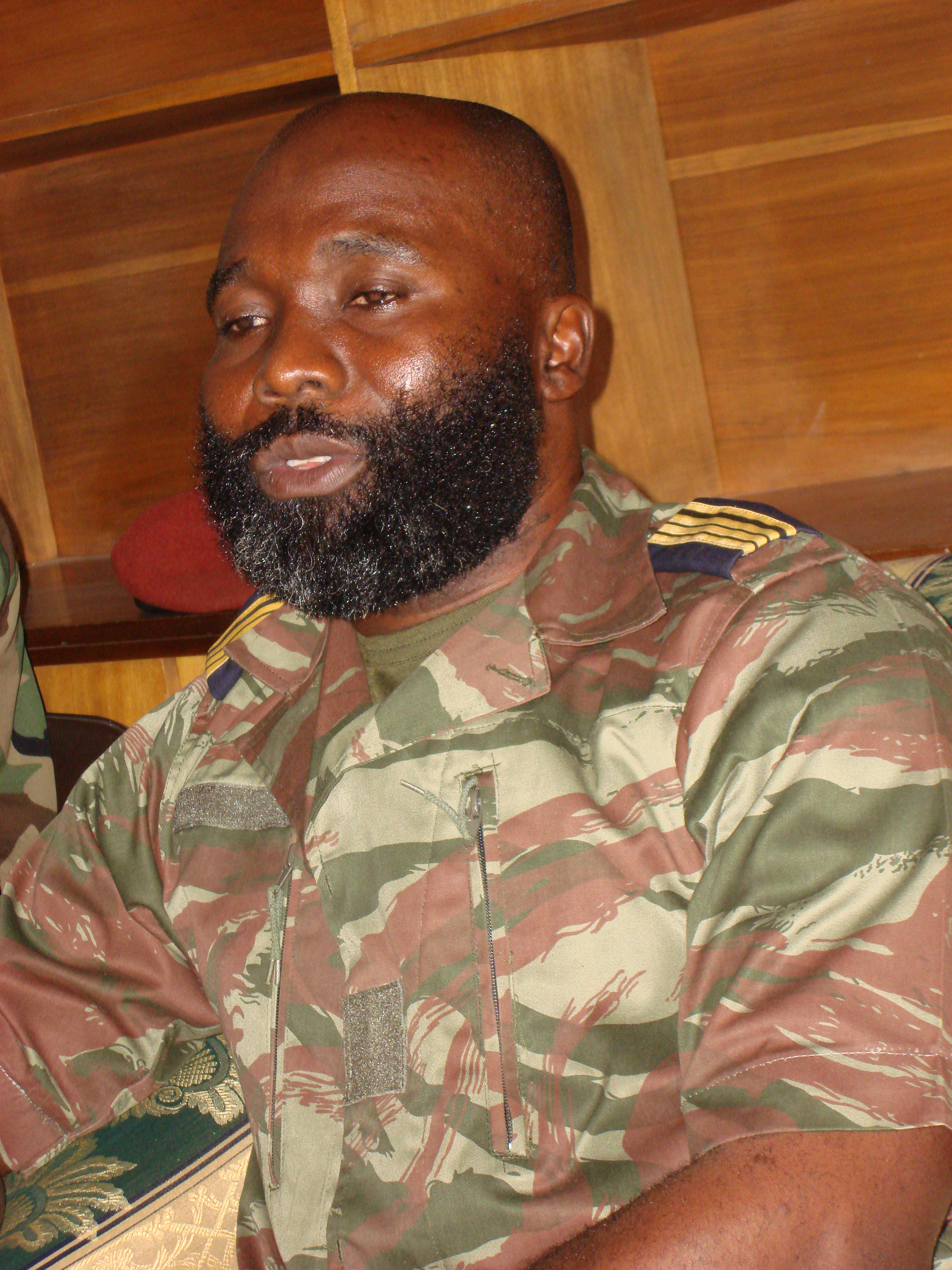
- Fofié in 2008
- Born: 1968
- Died: 9 August 2026 (aged 57–58)

Martin Fofié Kouakou (1968 – 9 August 2026) was an Ivorian military official. Originally a zone commander in the Forces Nouvelles de Côte d'Ivoire who oversaw the city of Korhogo, he was appointed to the Armed Forces of the Republic of Ivory Coast by Alassane Ouattara in 2011. At the time of his death, he was a Colonel-Major and commander of the Second Military Region in Daloa.

Fofié remained a popular figure in Korhogo and was seen as a protector of the city, though he had a reputation for violence and, in 2006, was placed under sanction by the United Nations Security Council Sanctions Committee for Cote d'Ivoire; his forces were accused of abduction, recruiting child soldiers, sexual abuse, and extrajudicial killings.

== Career ==
=== Early career, participation in 1999 coup and 2001 coup attempt ===
Fofié, born in 1968, was from Appimandoum, in the Bondoukou Department. He joined the Armed Forces of the Republic of Ivory Coast in the 1980s as a private, before becoming a sergeant working as an aide to then-general Robert Guéï. He had postings in Abidjan, Bouaké, and Korhogo, the city he would later rule. He participated in the 1999 Ivorian coup d'état, which resulted in the removal of President Henri Konan Bédié from office, and, subsequently, the 2001 Ivorian coup attempt against Laurent Gbagbo. The coup attempt was unsuccessful and resulted in Fofié's imprisonment and torture in cell 110 of the Fansara prison. He was released in 2002.

After his release from prison, Fofié formed his "Fansara 110" militia, also known as the Arc-en-ciel militia, joined the Forces Nouvelles (FN) rebel group, and was appointed to their chief of security in Korhogo, in zone 10. While in the position, he became popular in the city, created alliances with local elite, and was a potential candidate to replace the first FN commander of zone 10, Koné Messamba. (Note: Also spelt "Messemba") However, in January 2003, Zoumana Diarrassouba was chosen instead.

After rebel leader Ibrahim Coulibaly was arrested in Paris, France, later that year, a division emerged in the country between Coulibaly and FN leader Guillaume Soro; the pro-Soro faction launched attacks on those sympathetic to Coulibaly and seized control of the movement. In 2004, Fofié himself oversaw soldiers who allegedly carried out a massacre in connection with the wider dispute. Diarrassouba, an ally of Coulibaly, was ousted from leadership and, under pressure from traditional cantonal chief Coulibaly Drissa Douanier, the FN appointed Fofié as the new leader of zone 10.

=== Commander of zone 10 ===
Speaking of his ambitions for the city now under his leadership, Fofié said he wanted "to make Korhogo a nice place to live". His rule brought stability to the region as he allied himself with the elite and instituted "relatively robust restraints on civilian abuse". He had a reputation as a violent man, as did previous leaders; however, previous leaders had often provided little tangible benefit for the people of Korhogo. Fofié provided aid to civilians, pressured the power company to install lines leading to a poor neighborhood, opened a restaurant and bar, and rebuilt a park, marketplace and community centre. He held feasts and organized a parade to celebrate Ivory Coast's 50th anniversary of independence. Fofié took over local government operations to continue providing municipal services and collect taxes (which went to the FN), pressured or forced elites to improve and maintain the city, and, unlike other zone leaders, created an educational policy. He also instituted strict policing, punishing criminals with execution and employing the traditional Dozo hunters to provide security for the area in exchange for money, food, and vehicles. Additionally, Fofié would attend community events, such as weddings, and hold weekly meetings with the FN forces and the civilians to disseminate propaganda and allow civilians to discuss their ideas for the future Korhogo. Though he did not often speak directly to people, he had his forces drive trucks with loudspeakers through the city, announcing his plans. These policies made Fofié popular and well respected in Korhogo. Fofié was placed under sanction by the United Nations Security Council Sanctions Committee for Cote d'Ivoire in 2006; his forces were accused of abduction, recruiting child soldiers, sexual abuse, and extrajudicial killings.

In 2009, he was the only zone commander to attend the ceremony in Bouaké symbolically transferring power to the prefecture governments.

=== Reintegration into the army ===
After the reunification of Ivory Coast following the 2010-2011 crisis and subsequent civil war, Fofié was appointed by President Ouattara to the Ivorian military, at the rank of lieutenant colonel; he was promoted to such a high rank because of the work he had done to help Ouattara into power and was charged with overseeing Gbagbo's eight month stay in a Korhogo safehouse before he was taken to The Hague for prosecution by the International Criminal Court. Fofié's appointment was criticised by the Human Rights Watch because of the outstanding allegations of human rights abuses against him; Daniel Bekele, executive director of the organization's African division, said:

Even by the former rebel army's standards, Fofié's behavior stood out as particularly appalling, forcing the Security Council to take action. His integration into the new Ivorian military mocks the many victims of his forces, including children used as soldiers under his command.

Fofié maintained close ties to armed groups and the elite and people of Korhogo, even after his re-integration into the Ivorian military. He attended social events, made frequent visits, distributed food and money to Korhogo residents, and assisted the Dozo hunters against the rise of bandits in the area. He also assisted ex-FN soldiers who had not been re-integrated into the military; his reputation made it easier for those who had worked for him to live in Korhogo and he gave houses to some ex-combatants. Those houses also functioned as safe houses and weapons storage for Fofié; it was estimated that, in 2013, he had amassed as much weaponry as the national army.

This continued popularity in Korhogo caused tensions with the Ivorian government, especially worrying Ouattara and chief of staff in the armed forces Soumaïla Bakayoko. The two men attempted to separate Fofié from the city in 2015, when Minister of Defense Paul Koffi Koffi reassigned Fofié to a post in Daloa. Fofié refused to move, so the chief of staff ordered his resignation. Again, Fofié refused, and the military recanted their orders. He agreed to a transfer in 2016 or 2017, and he became a Colonel-Major and commander of the Second Military Region in the city.

In 2019, in the midst of tensions between Ouattara and Soro, the Ivorian government raided several of Fofié's safehouses in Korhogo.

Fofié had financial ties to protection schemes in Korhogo gold mines.

== Public image ==
With a large beard, Fofié was a political strongman who maintained a positive reputation in Korhogo as a "protector" both during and after the rule of his city. He was viewed as an efficient leader who harshly punished criminals, though he also had "arbitrary and rude dealings" with those who displeased him and was known to use violence against opponents.

In common speech, he was referred to by his military title.

=== Cultural centre ===
While zone commander of Korhogo, Fofié rebuilt a community center in the city to improve his image. Officially named Womiengnon, and commonly known in French as le bien commune, the refurbished centre opened on 18 February 2006 in a ceremony attended by the local elite.

== Personal life and death ==
Fofié was married and had children. He died after an illness on 9 August 2026. In response, Guillaume Soro issued a condolence statement calling Fofié his "brother".

He was a collector of works by the Ivorian artist Sapero de Farafina.
