= History of Ivory Coast (1999–present) =

This period in the history of Ivory Coast was affected by the end of the 33-year reign of Félix Houphouët-Boigny in 1993, as well as demographic change which had seen the Muslim population rise from 6% in 1922 to 38.6% in 1998, including a majority in the north of the country.

== 1999 coup d'état ==
The 1999 Ivorian coup d'état was the first coup in the history of independent Ivory Coast and led to the deposition of President Henri Konan Bédié. The soldiers executing it were led by Tuo Fozié, and former military commander Robert Guéï was soon invited to lead a National Public Salvation Committee (French: Comité National de Salut Public). Another leader of the coup was Ibrahim Coulibaly.

Scattered gunfire were heard around Abidjan. Guéï announced the dissolution of parliament, the former government, the constitutional council and the supreme court. The rebels took control of Abidjan Airport and key bridges, set up checkpoints, and opened prison gates to release political prisoners and other inmates. Mobs took advantage of the power vacuum to hijack cars. Some parts of Abidjan were also looted by soldiers and civilians. The Ivorian Human Rights League (French: Ligue ivoirienne des droits de l'homme) issued a condemnation of human rights abuses, charging the security forces, among other things, with summary executions of alleged criminals without investigation and of harassment of commercial entities. Also, soldiers demanded increases in pay or bonus payments, causing many mutinies. The most serious one of these mutinies took place on 4 July 2000. The mutineers targeted the cities of Abidjan, Bouake, Katiola, Korhogo, and Yamoussoukro in particular. After some days of confusion and tension, an agreement was reached between the discontented soldiers and the authorities.

== 2000 elections ==
A constitutional referendum was held in Ivory Coast on 23 and 24 July 2000. The changes to the constitution required both parents of presidential candidates to have been born in the country, as well as giving immunity from prosecution from those involved in the coup the previous year. It was approved by 86.53% of voters with a 56% turnout. The changes barred Rally of the Republicans leader Alassane Ouattara from running for president. Ouattara represented the predominantly Muslim north, particularly the poor immigrant workers from Mali and Burkina Faso working on coffee and cocoa plantations.

Presidential elections were held in Ivory Coast on 22 October 2000. Guéï stood as a candidate in the election. All of the major opposition candidates except for Laurent Gbagbo of the Ivorian Popular Front (FPI) were barred from standing. The Rally of the Republicans (RDR) and Democratic Party of Côte d'Ivoire – African Democratic Rally (PDCI-RCA) boycotted the election in response to the exclusion of their candidates (respectively, Alassane Ouattara and Emile Constant Bombet) by the Supreme Court.

Guéï initially claimed to have won the presidency in a single round. However, it soon emerged that Gbagbo had actually won 59 percent of the vote—enough to win in a single round. When Guéï continued to insist he had won, a wave of protests drove him from power, and Gbagbo was sworn in as President.

== First civil war ==
Troops, many of whom originated from the north of the country, mutinied in the early hours of 19 September 2002. They launched attacks in many cities, including Abidjan. By midday they had control of the north of the country. Their principal claim related to the definition of who is a citizen of Ivory Coast (and so who can stand for election as President), voting rights and their representation in government in Abidjan.

On the first night of the uprising, former president Robert Guéi was killed. There is some dispute as to what actually happened that night. The government said he had died leading a coup attempt, and state television showed pictures of his body in the street. However, it was widely claimed that his body had been moved after his death and that he had actually been murdered at his home along with fifteen other people. Alassane Ouattara took refuge in the French embassy, and his home was burned down.

It was later claimed that the rebellion was planned in Burkina Faso by soldiers of the Ivory Coast close to General Guéï. Guillaume Soro, leader of the Patriotic Movement of Côte d'Ivoire (MPCI) later to be known as the Forces Nouvelles de Côte d'Ivoire/New Forces – the rebel movement – comes from a student union close to the FPI of Gbagbo, but was also a substitute for an RDR candidate in the legislative elections of 2000. Louis Dacoury Tabley was also one of the leaders of the FPI.

As part of the civil war, an armed conflict took place between France and Côte d'Ivoire. On 6 November 2004, Ivorians launched an air attack on French peacekeepers in the northern part of Côte d'Ivoire who were stationed there as part of Opération Licorne (Unicorn), the French military operation in support of the United Nations Operation in Côte d'Ivoire (UNOCI). French military forces subsequently clashed with Ivorian troops and government-loyal mobs, destroying the entire Ivorian Air Force. Those incidents were followed by massive anti-French protests in Côte d'Ivoire.

A peace agreement between the government and the former rebel New Forces was signed on 4 March 2007, and in late April 2009, it was announced that the elections would be held by 6 December 2009, and that the date would be announced shortly. On 15 May 2009, the date was announced to be 29 November 2009. On 11 November, the elections were postponed again due to delays in the electoral roll. It was announced on 3 December 2009 to be held in late February or early March 2010.

== Second civil war ==
Presidential elections were held in Ivory Coast in 2010. The first round was held on 31 October, and a second round, in which President Laurent Gbagbo faced opposition leader Alassane Ouattara, was held on 28 November 2010. After northern candidate Alassane Ouattara was declared the victor of the 2010 Ivorian presidential election by the country's Independent Electoral Commission (CEI), the President of the Constitutional Council – an ally of Gbagbo – declared the results to be invalid and that Gbagbo was the winner. Both Gbagbo and Ouattara claimed victory and took the presidential oath of office.

After the disputed election, sporadic outbreaks of violence took place, particularly in Abidjan, where supporters of Ouattara clashed repeatedly with government forces and militias. Gbagbo's forces were said to be responsible for a campaign of assassinations, beatings and abductions directed against Ouattara's supporters. The Second Ivorian Civil War broke out in March 2011 when the crisis in Ivory Coast escalated into full-scale military conflict as Ouattara's forces seized control of most of the country with the help of the UN, with Gbagbo entrenched in Abidjan, the country's largest city. Overall casualties of the war were estimated around 3000.

The UN and French forces took military action, with the stated objective to protect their forces and civilians. Gbagbo was arrested 11 April 2011 by pro-Ouattara forces, who were supported by French troops. Gbagbo was then extradited to The Hague in November 2011, where he was charged with four counts of crimes against humanity in the International Criminal Court in connection with the post-election violence.

== Post-civil war ==
Presidential elections were held in Ivory Coast on 25 October 2015. President Alassane Ouattara stood again to seek a second term. Opposition party Ivorian Popular Front (FPI) called for a boycott of the elections in protest against the trial of former President Laurent Gbagbo by the International Criminal Court. But others felt the party needed to remain engaged in the electoral process. The vote was relatively peaceful, compared to the unrest that marred previous elections, although voter turnout was down to 54.6%. Outtara avoided a second round vote and won a second term in office after garnering 83.7%, in a landslide victory over his nearest rival Affi N'Guessan on 9.3%.

In January 2017 incumbent President Alassane Ouattara of the Rally of Houphouëtists for Democracy and Peace (RHDP) announced that he would not run again after being president for two terms (2010–2015 and 2015–2020). On 5 March 2020, he publicly reiterated his intent not to be candidate during an address to Congress. Ouattara imposed Prime Minister Amadou Gon Coulibaly as the RHDP candidate of the ruling party over other potential candidates, including Vice President Daniel Kablan Duncan, who later resigned. However, in May Coulibaly was hospitalised for heart complications and had a stent fitted. He returned to Ivory Coast on 2 July, but died six days later after falling ill during a meeting of the Council of Ministers. The event left the RHDP without a candidate, and Ouattara considered putting forward Defense Minister Hamed Bakayoko, before renouncing due to alleged links to drug trafficking. In late July 2020, Ouattara rescinded his initial decision and announced his candidacy for a third term. The candidacy was made possible despite his previous terms as they did not count toward the two-term limit in the new constitution introduced in 2016, the elections having taken place under a different constitution.

Presidential elections were held in Ivory Coast on 31 October 2020. The election, boycotted by the opposition, saw the reelection of incumbent Alassane Ouattara. Election monitors from ECOWAS had to travel by helicopter to reach Abidjan due to difficulties entering the city. Opposition supporters attacked several motorcades of pro-government figures, in some cases shooting at them, or setting vehicles on fire. Several people were also killed in clashes in Toumodi, as well as Tiébissou.

On February 20, 2025, France returned its sole military base in Ivory Coast to local Ivorian authorities. France had occupied the Port-Bouët military base for more than 50 years.

== See also ==
- History of Ivory Coast (1960–99)
