= Chief of the Defence Staff (Ivory Coast) =

Head of the armed forces of Ivory Coast

Chief of the Defence Staff of Ivory Coast
- Chef d'état-major des armées de la Côte d'Ivoire
- Coat of arms of Ivory Coast
- Incumbent; Army corps general Lassina Doumbia since 28 December 2018
- Armed Forces
- Type: Chief of staff
- Status: Senior-most officer
- Abbreviation: CEMA
- Appointer: President of Ivory Coast; Alassane Ouattara
- Term length: Not fixed
- Inaugural holder: Army corps general Thomas d'Aquin Ouattara
- Formation: 1960

The Chief of the Defence Staff (French: Chef d'état-major des armées—CEMA) is the professional head of the Armed Forces of the Republic of Ivory Coast. The Chief of the Defence Staff is appointed by the President of Ivory Coast, who is the commander-in-chief of the Armed Forces according to the Constitution.

The current Chief of the Defence Staff is Army corps general Lassina Doumbia, since 28 December 2018.

== List of chiefs of the defence staff ==
No.	Portrait	Chief of the Defence Staff	Took office	Left office	Time in office	Defence branch	Ref.
1	Thomas d'Aquin Ouattara [fr]	Army corps general Thomas d'Aquin Ouattara (1916–1990)	1960	1974	13–14 years	Army	
2	Ibrahima Coulibaly	Army corps general Ibrahima Coulibaly	1974	1979	4–5 years	Army	–
3	Bertin Zézé Baroan	Divisional general Bertin Zézé Baroan	1979	November 1987	7–8 years	Army	
4	Félix Ory	Brigadier general Félix Ory	November 1987	1990	2–3 years	Army	
5	Robert Guéï	Brigadier general Robert Guéï (1941–2002) (Note: Later staged the 1999 Ivorian coup d'état, and served as head of state from 1999 until 2000.)	1990	1995	4–5 years	Army	–
6	Lassana Timité	Vice admiral Lassana Timité	1995	1999	3–4 years	Navy	–
7	Soumaïla Diabagaté	Brigadier general Soumaïla Diabagaté	1999	2000	0–1 years	Army	–
8	Mathias Doué [fr]	Divisional general Mathias Doué (1946–2017) (Note: Removed following the 2004 French–Ivorian clashes.)	2000	2004	3–4 years	Army	–
9	Philippe Mangou	Army corps general Philippe Mangou (born 1952) (Note: Removed following the Second Ivorian Civil War.)	2004	2011	6–7 years	Army	
10	Soumaila Bakayoko	Army corps general Soumaila Bakayoko (born 1953) (Note: Previously served as the Chief of Staff of the rebel FNCI. Dismissed following the 2017 Ivory Coast mutinies.)	7 July 2011	9 January 2017	5 years, 182 days	Army	
11	Sékou Touré [fr]	Army corps general Sékou Touré (born 1956)	9 January 2017	28 December 2018	1 year, 353 days	Army	
12	Lassina Doumbia [fr]	Army corps general Lassina Doumbia	28 December 2018	Incumbent	7 years, 253 days	Army	

== See also ==
- Armed Forces of the Republic of Ivory Coast
