= List of wars involving Ivory Coast =

Conflict	Combatant 1	Combatant 2	Results
First Ivorian Civil War (2002–2007)	Ivory Coast; COJEP; Supported by: Belarus	FNCI; Alleged support: Burkina Faso; Liberia France; UNOCI	Tentative peace agreement, followed by renewed conflict
2004 French–Ivorian clashes (2004)	Côte d'Ivoire (Belarus) Belarusian mercenaries	France (Ivory Coast) Forces Nouvelles de Côte d'Ivoire	French Victory
Second Ivorian Civil War (2010–2011)	Military of Ivory Coast (Liberia) Liberian mercenaries COJEP; FPI	(Ivory Coast) FNCI (Liberia) Liberian mercenaries (Ivory Coast) RDR (United Nations) UNOCI; France; Ukraine	Ouattara/UN/French victory: Gbagbo capture
War in the Sahel (2011–present)	Alliance of Sahel States: Mali; Niger; Burkina Faso; Benin; Togo (Note: JNIM has had a small presence in northern Togo since 2021, with several attacks carried out since then.); Ivory Coast (Note: Jihadist groups have little to no presence on Ivorian soil, but have occasionally launched attacks along the Burkinabe-Ivorian border since 2019. AQIM attacked Grand-Bassam in 2016 as well.); Algeria (Note: No jihadist groups are active on Algerian soil, although the country has been attacked several times in the early days of the Mali War by jihadist groups. Currently, diplomatic relations between the AES states and Algeria are bad due to Algeria allowing FLA rebels on their soil.); Mauritania (Note: The Mauritanian government currently has a non-aggression pact with JNIM-aligned jihadists, and has not had an attack by jihadist groups on its soil since 2011. Small JNIM cells are present along the Malian border.) Supported by: Africa Corps (since 2021) (Note: Previously Wagner Group, since renamed Africa Corps and absorbed by Russian government.); Turkey (since 2022); France (2013-2023); United States (until 2024); MINUSMA (2013-2023) (Note: For full list of MINUSMA combatants, see here); AFISMA (2012-2013); G5 Sahel (until 2023)	Al-Qaeda; Jama'at Nasr al-Islam wal Muslimin; Ansarul Islam; Boko Haram; Islamic State; Islamic State - Sahel Province; Lakurawa (2023-present); Islamic State - West Africa Province; Azawad Liberation Front Nigerien anti-coup movement: Patriotic Front for Justice; Free Armed Forces; Former belligerents: CSP-PSD (2023-2024); Coordination of Azawad Movements (2014-2021, 2023-2024); MNLA (2012-2024); HCUA (2013-2024); MAA (2012-2024) GATIA (al-Mahmoud faction) (2023–2024) (Note: Faction affiliated with the CSP-PSD) Patriotic Liberation Front (2023-2024)	Ongoing: Mali War: Tuareg rebels and allied Islamists overrun Northern Mali in 2012 until pushed back by a French intervention; Islamist insurgency in Burkina Faso: Mali War spills over into Burkina Faso by 2015 as Islamists capture about 40% of Burkinabé territory; Islamist insurgency in Niger; Boko Haram insurgency arises and extends in Chad, Niger, and Cameroon; French and American intervention on behalf of governments; Al-Qaeda–Islamic State conflict and the JNIM-ISGS war; Jihadist insurgency in Northern Benin; Rise of the coup belt

== Bibliography ==
- Themnér, Anders (2015). "Former Military Networks and the Micro-Politics of Violence and Statebuilding in Liberia". Comparative Politics. 47 (1). New York City: Graduate Center, CUNY: 334–353. doi:10.5129/001041515814709284.
