= Tuo Fozié =

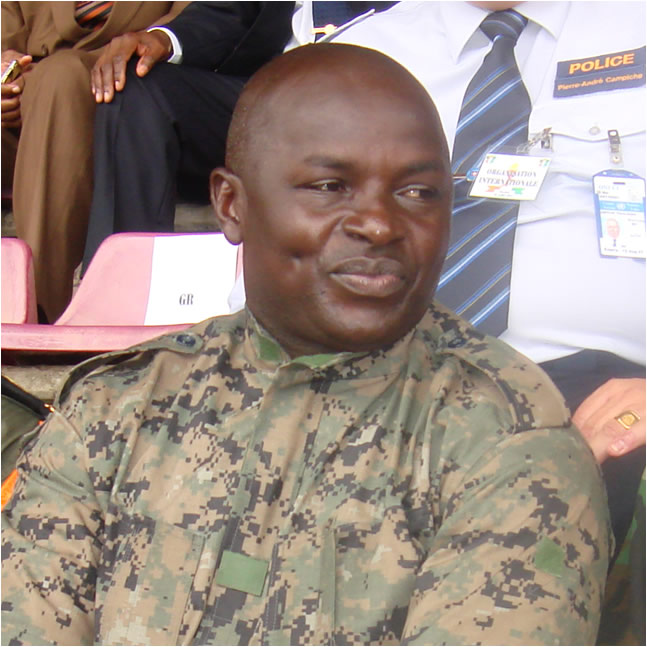
Tuo Fozié

Tuo Fozié is an Ivorian military officer and politician. Since 2012, he has been the prefect of both Bounkani Region and Bouna Department in north-eastern Ivory Coast.

As an officer in the Ivorian army, Fozié was a central supporter of the 1999 coup d'état that led to Robert Guéï being installed as interim head of state until the next elections. When Guéï decided to run for president in the election, Fozié dropped his support, and he participated in the September 2000 attack on Guéï's residence. Fozié was charged with crimes against the security of the state and he went into exile in Burkina Faso.

In 2002, Fozié returned to Ivory Coast and was a central supporter of an attempted coup, which ultimately developed into the First Ivorian Civil War. Fozié was a commander in the rebel Forces Nouvelles de Côte d'Ivoire, but he refused to accept any promotions beyond that of warrant officer, the office he held in the state army.

In 2003, a government of national reconciliation was formed under Prime Minister Seydou Diarra, and Fozié became the minister of youth and public service. When Diarra was succeeded by Charles Konan Banny in December 2005, Fozié was dismissed as a minister. Between 2005 and 2012, Fozié was the chief of police of the Forces Nouvelles in Bouaké.

In 2012, President Alassane Ouattara appointed Fozié as prefect of Bounkani Region and Bouna Department. While serving in these civilian offices, Fozié continues to wear his military uniform.
