= Soumaila Bakayoko (soldier) =

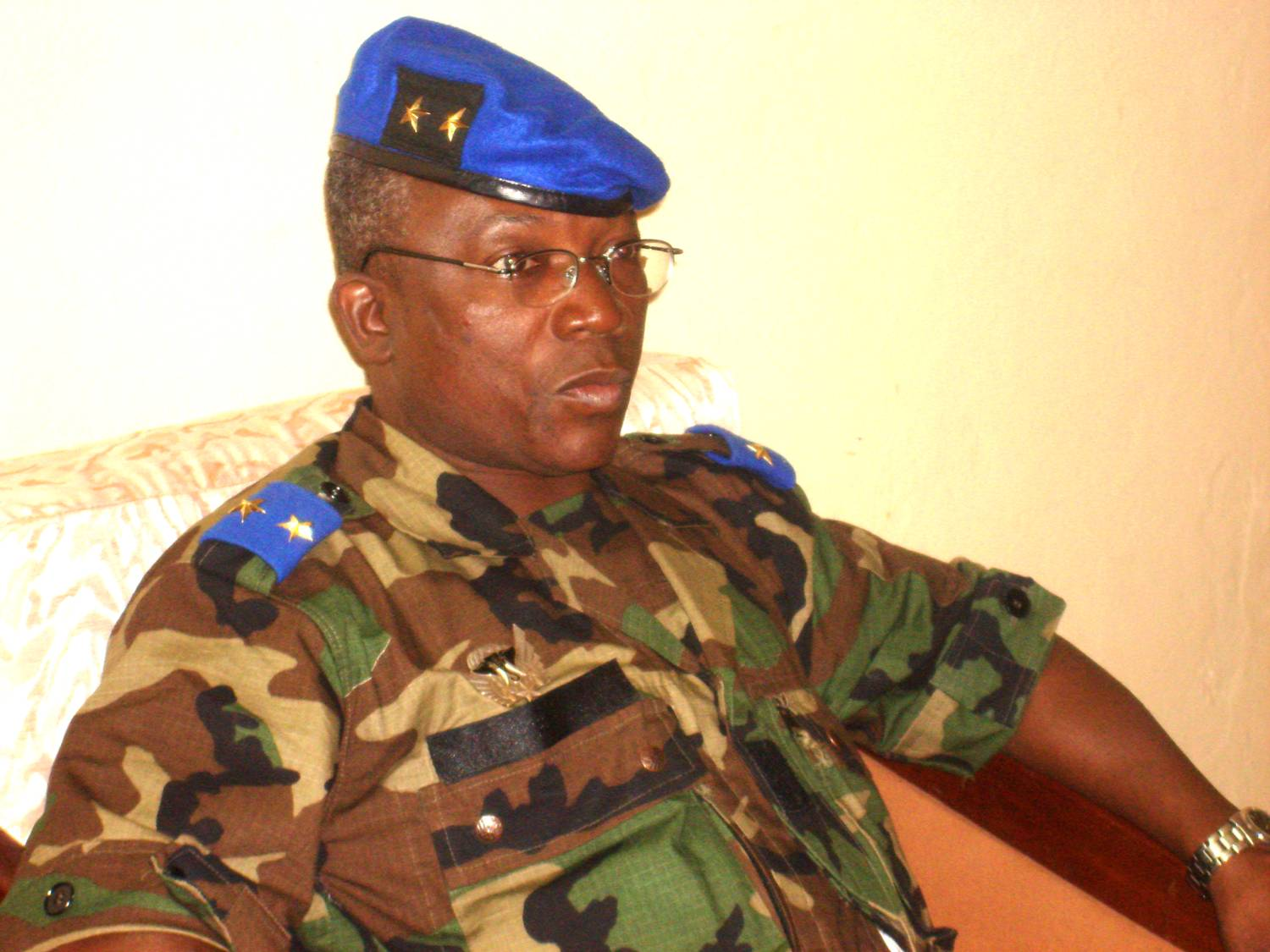
- Bakayoko as FNCI commander, 2008
- Born: December 31, 1953 (age 72); Babien, Seguela Department, Ivory Coast
- Allegiance: FNCI (2002-2011); FACI (2011-2017)
- Rank: Army Corps General
- Commands: Chief of Staff of the Armed Forces (FNCI, FACI)
- Other work: Chairman of the Board of the Directors of the Ivorian Refining Company (2018-present)

Soumaila Bakayoko is an Ivorian soldier who served as the chief of staff of the Forces Nouvelles de Côte d'Ivoire. He is close to Guillaume Soro. When Alassane Ouattara became president in 2011, Bakayoko was appointed chief of staff of the Ivorian Armed Forces. He was dismissed from his position in 2017 and has served as the director of the Ivorian Refining Company since 2018.

== Biography ==
Bakayoko was born on December 31, 1953 in Babien, Séguéla Department, in French-occupied Ivory Coast. He attended the Bingerville Preparatory Technical Military School. Bakayoko joined the Ivorian Armed Forces on September 10, 1975 and became a second lieutenant in 1979.

When the First Ivorian Civil War broke out in 2002, Bakayoko was a colonel and had been serving in the 1st Engineering Battalion of Bouaké since 1999. He defected to the rebels. In 2003, he became Chief of Staff of the Forces Nouvelles. After 2005, he was assisted by Issiaka Ouattara, another warlord. That same year, he became a brigadier general. However, Bakayoko didn't control military operations; this was done by Ouattara and Cherif Ousmane. Bakayoko also served as the liaison for the Forces Nouvelles in the Integrated Command Center of Philippe Mangou, the chief of staff of the Government army.

On July 7, 2011, Bakayoko was promoted to divisional general and appointed chief of staff of the Armed Forces of the Republic of Ivory Coast (AFCI), succeeding Mangou. Bakayoko was responsible for integrating former members of the Forces Nouvelles and the current Armed Forces. He became an army corps general on August 6, 2012. Bakayoko was implicated in the Bassole-Soro wiretap affair in 2015. Following the 2017 Ivory Coast mutinies, Bakayoko was dismissed from chief of staff and replaced by Sékou Touré.

In 2018, Bakayoko was appointed as the chairman of the board of directors of the Ivorian Refining Company.
