= FNCI =

FNCI may refer to:

- First Nations Composer Initiative
- Forces Nouvelles de Côte d'Ivoire
