= Ibrahim Coulibaly =

Ivorian rebel (1964–2011)

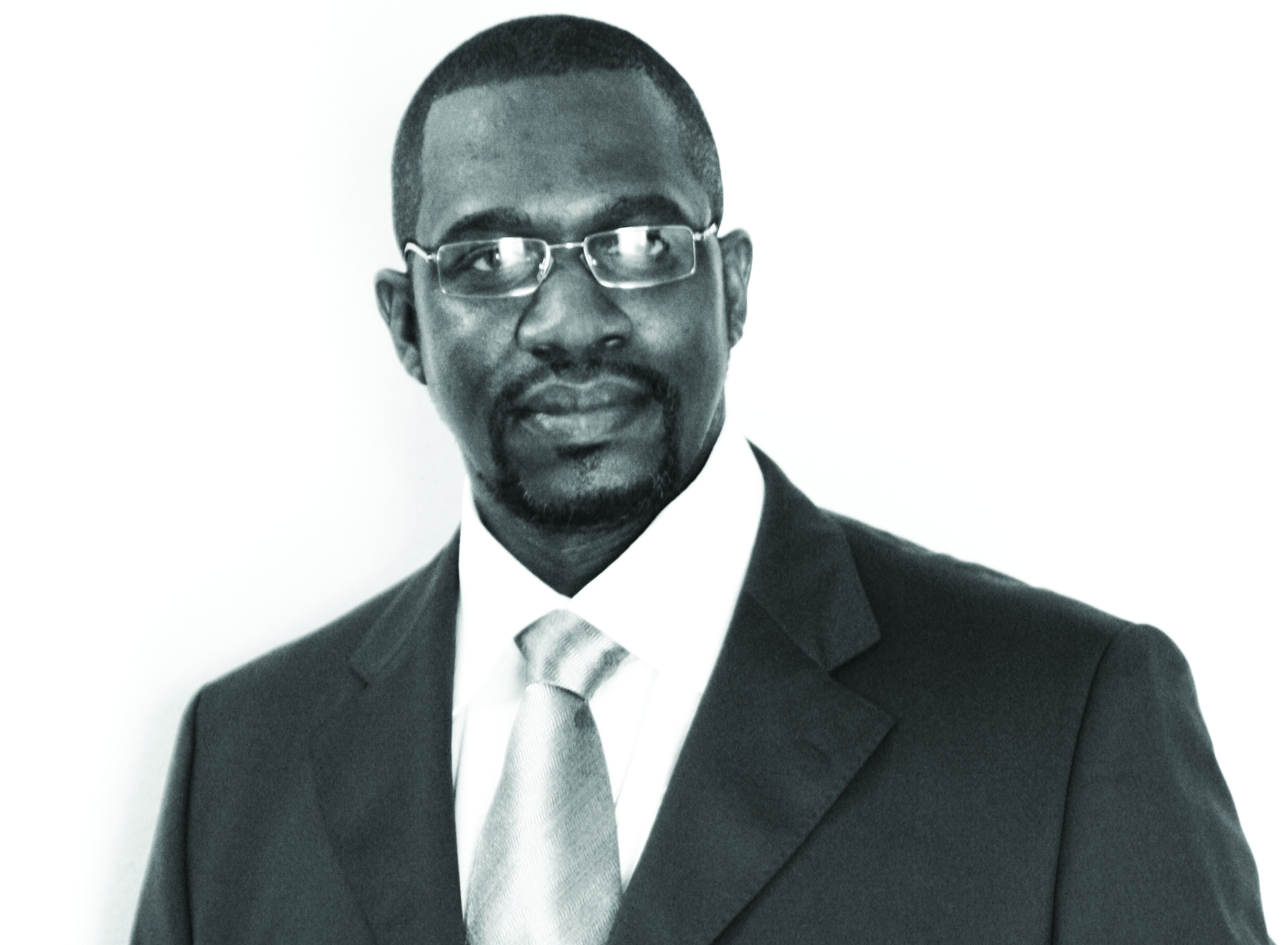
Photo of Ibrahim Coulibaly, a.k.a. "Major IB"

Ibrahim Coulibaly (24 February 1964 – 27 April 2011) was a military and rebel leader in Côte d'Ivoire. A staff sergeant in the Armed Forces of Côte d'Ivoire, Coulibaly had served since at least the early 1990s. As Côte d'Ivoire slid into communal conflict, Coulibaly joined the 1999 coup led by Robert Guéï. A second coup, following the 2000 elections that made Laurent Gbagbo President, saw Coulibaly in a leadership position, after which he came into conflict with fellow military leader Guillaume Soro. During the ensuing eight years of division in the country, Coulibaly came into conflict with both sides, eventually returning to lead an Abidjan-based militia supportive of Alassane Ouattara. Following the end of fighting, Coulibaly was killed in Abidjan by Ouattara's forces during an attempt to disarm his group. Known popularly as "IB", he was 47 years old at the time of his death.

== Early career ==
Ibrahim Coulibaly was born in 1964 in Bouaké, Côte d'Ivoire. He entered the Armed Forces of Côte d'Ivoire in 1985, rising to the rank of Staff-Sergeant. In the early 1990s, Coulibaly attracted attention within the military as a soldier and as a basketball player, and was promoted to the bodyguard unit of Prime Minister Alassane Ouattara. Here he became involved in politics and came to meet higher-ranking officers who would eventually be involved in the 1999 Ivorian coup d'état.

== 1999 coup ==
Ibrahim Coulibaly became known as one of the leaders of the December 1999 coup that deposed President Henri Konan Bédié and brought military leader Robert Guéï to power. It was Guéï who first appointed Coulibaly to a political position, naming him a military attaché to the Ivorian Ambassador to Canada. When it became clear Guéï wished to continue in power after planned elections, a September 2000 assassination attempt was reputedly planned by members of the military. Coulibaly, implicated in the plot, fled the country.

== Ivorian Civil War ==
The contentious October 2000 elections, in which Ouattara was disqualified, thwarted Guéï's attempt to remain in power and made Laurent Gbagbo President of Côte d'Ivoire. Continued tensions of citizenship and ethnicity, like those that led to the 1999 coup, saw another failed coup attempt in January 2001. Coulibaly was again implicated and fled to Burkina Faso, where he and other opponents of the Gbagbo government were sheltered by regional rival Blaise Compaore. In September 2002, Coulibaly returned to the north of Côte d'Ivoire, helping lead a partially successful coup against Gbagbo's government. Coulibaly's faction, one of many on the rebel side, held territory in and around Bouaké before both sides fell into a stalemate that became the First Ivorian Civil War. Various factions were uneasily united in the northern-based Forces Nouvelles de Côte d'Ivoire, led from Bouaké. In August 2003, he was arrested in Paris under suspicion of seeking to destabilize the Ivorian government, but he was released on bail in September. In June 2004 fighting broke out between his followers and those of rival rebel commander Guillaume Soro. In January 2005, Coulibaly expressed support for efforts by the African Union at mediating the political crisis.

Coulibaly's associates were allegedly responsible for the assassination attempt on Ivorian Prime Minister Guillaume Soro in June 2007.

On December 30, 2007, the New Forces (former rebels) accused Coulibaly of attempting a coup on the night of December 27–28. It said that he had moved towards the Côte d'Ivoire-Ghana border to "join his accomplices" on that night; he had previously been staying in Cotonou, Benin, but was ordered to leave Benin by that country's government for allegedly working to destabilize Côte d'Ivoire. A clash on that night in Bouake led to the death of Seydou Traore, who the New Forces said was working for Coulibaly as the "central coordinator of the conspiracy". Those involved in the clash who were captured were said to have identified Coulibaly as the leader of the plot.

== Arrest warrants ==
France and Côte d'Ivoire both issued international arrest warrants for Coulibaly. On March 10, 2008, a trial of Coulibaly, involving his alleged plot to seize power and kill Gbagbo with mercenaries in 2003, began in Paris. Coulibaly was tried in absentia; his lawyers said that they did not know where he was. Twelve co-defendants were on trial with him, most of whom were present, having been arrested in France in mid-2003. On March 11, Coulibaly denied the charges in an interview with Agence France-Presse, saying that he had never attempted to recruit any mercenaries in France. According to Coulibaly, he was in Belgium at the time of the interview and would not go to France to participate in the trial. He claimed that the legal proceedings against him were intended to keep him from returning to Côte d'Ivoire to run against Gbagbo in the 2008 presidential election.

The French court found Coulibaly guilty of "heading or organising a group with mercenary objectives", and sentenced him in absentia to four years in prison on June 4, 2008. Five of his co-defendants were acquitted and the remaining seven were given sentences lighter than Coulibaly's.

== 2010–2011 Ivorian crisis ==
In January 2011, Coulibaly appeared as the reputed head of a militia group opposed to Laurent Gbagbo. Based in the Abidjan neighborhood of Abobo, the militia calling itself "The Invisible Commandos" led a series of surprise raids against his forces. After the March 2011 offensive by forces loyal to Ouattara reached the capital and deposed Gbagbo, the Ivorian Armed Forces siding with Ouattara and Guillaume Soro (the Republican Forces of Côte d'Ivoire) began operations to disarm militias on both sides, including Coulibaly's. On 27 April 2011, according to an Ivorian defense ministry spokesman, Coulibaly was killed by FRCI forces.

== See also ==
- 1999 Ivorian coup d'état
- First Ivorian Civil War (2002)
- Assassination attempt on Guillaume Soro (2007)
- 2010–2011 Ivorian crisis
- Second Ivorian Civil War (2011)
