= 2001 Ivorian coup attempt =

Date	7–8 January 2001
Location	Ivory Coast
Result	Failure of the coup attempt

Belligerents
Armed Forces of the Republic of Ivory Coast	(Ivory Coast) Dissenting faction of the armed forces

Commanders and leaders
(Ivory Coast) Laurent Gbagbo	(Ivory Coast) Ibrahim Coulibaly

The 2001 Ivorian coup attempt was a failed coup d'état in the Ivory Coast by dissident factions of the Ivorian military trying to topple Laurent Gbagbo's government. The coup attempt began on the night of January 7 when rebel forces staged attacks on state broadcast facilities and the presidential residence in Abidjan, airing out the message "Dear compatriots, dear Ivorians. The country has undergone another change." after successfully seizing the broadcasting stations.

The following clashes between government forces and the dissident soldiers caused at least six deaths, including two policemen. The rebel forces were routed and driven away from state radio stations in the city. In the retaken radio stations, government ministers issued a broadcast reassuring the country that the coup attempt had been foiled. A three-day long curfew was imposed following the attempted coup and Felix Houphouet Boigny airport was also closed momentarily. In the end, government forces had arrested forty soldiers involved in the coup attempt and detained them.

The coup attempt, led by Ibrahim Coulibaly (IB), came to be known as the Black Mercedes Plot, named after the command vehicle IB used.

The government implicated the supporters of Alassane Ouattara, who was disqualified from participating in the 2000 Ivorian Presidential Election, of being behind the coup attempt, suggesting potential motives could be grievance over his exclusion from the elections due to contested claims of foreign birth. The party spokesman for Quattara's party Rally of the Republicans denied such involvement, saying "We have understood the insinuation, I think they could take advantage of a situation like this to settle their score with us."
