= Issiaka Ouattara =

Ivorian military serviceman (1967–2020)

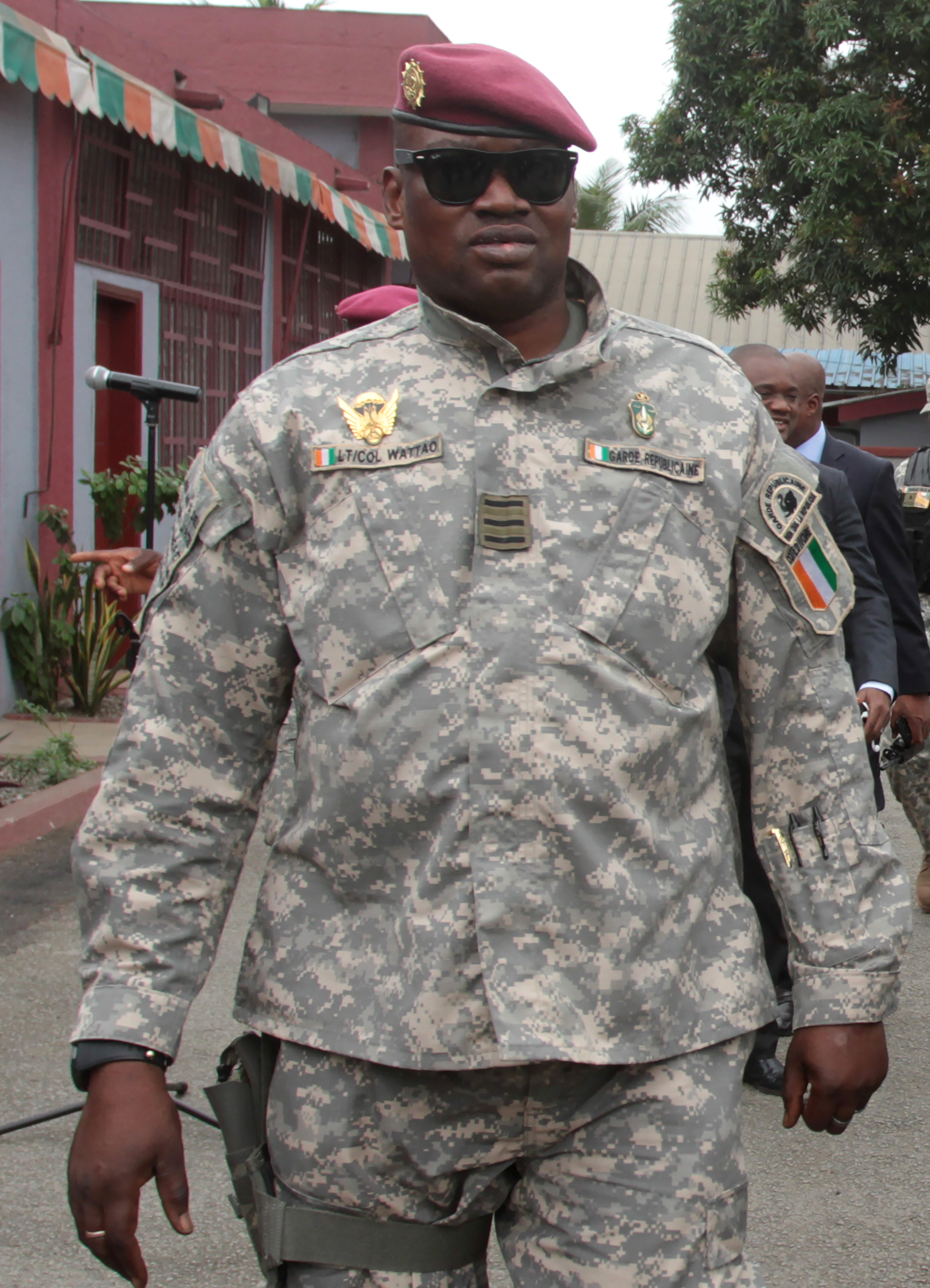
- The Ivorian soldier Issiaka Ouattara, known as Wattao
- Born: 1967; Bouna, Ivory Coast
- Died: 5 January 2020 (aged 52–53); New York City, New York, United States
- Military career
- Allegiance: Ivory Coast
- Branch: Armed Forces of the Republic of Ivory Coast
- Service years: 1980s–2020
- Rank: Lieutenant colonel
- Nickname: Wattao

Issiaka Ouattara (1967 – 5 January 2020) was an Ivorian military serviceman. He served as lieutenant colonel and was part of the Forces Nouvelles de Côte d'Ivoire. Ouattara was also a major player in the First Ivorian Civil War.
