= 2017 Ivory Coast mutinies =

- 2017 Ivory Coast mutinies (Ivory Coast)
| Date | 6–8 January 2017; 12–16 May 2017 |
| Location | Ivory Coast |
| Result | Peace deal: soldiers receive higher wages, mutineers are amnestied |

Belligerents
| (Ivory Coast) Ivorian government: Loyal army elements; Republican Guard | Army mutineers (mostly ex-New Forces rebels) |

Commanders and leaders
| (Ivory Coast) Alassane Ouattara (Ivory Coast) Soumaila Bakayoko (Ivory Coast) Alain-Richard Donwahi (POW) (Ivory Coast) Lt-Col Issiaka Ouattara (POW) | (Ivory Coast) Guillaume Soro (allegedly) |

Strength
| c. 13,600 men | c. 8,400 men |

Casualties and losses
| | At least 3 |
- At least eight civilians killed.

A major mutiny broke out among the army of Ivory Coast in January 2017. The mutineers, mostly ex-Forces Nouvelles de Côte d'Ivoire rebels who had been integrated into the armed forces in 2011, were motivated by grievances about their pay and living conditions. Seizing control of nine cities throughout the country, they pressured the government to accept their demands, whereupon the mutiny ended. Smaller mutinies erupted on 17 January and 7 February, and another large-scale second mutiny broke out in May 2017.

== History ==
=== 6-8 January ===
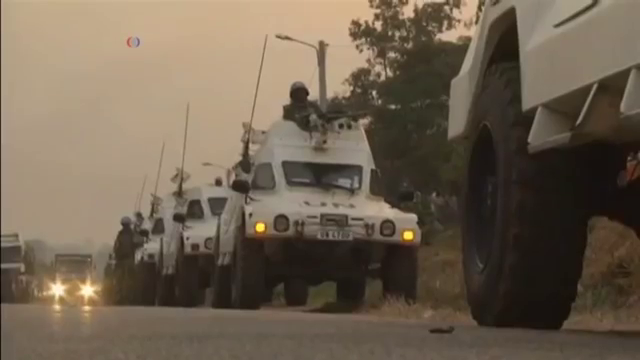
UN peacekeepers were deployed to prevent an outbreak of large-scale combat during the mutinies.

The revolt began around 2 a.m. on 6 January, when demobilised soldiers in Bouake, who demanded higher salaries and the payment of bonuses, seized weapons and ammunition at the local military base and police stations. They were soon joined by other, still active soldiers, who had served during ECOWAS mission in Liberia, but claimed to not have been paid for taking part in these operations. After some firefights, the mutineers secured Bouaké, blockaded the city's entrances and told the local civilians to stay indoors. No further violence took place at Bouaké, though the mutiny quickly spread to other cities. Soldiers revolted at Daloa's military base; according to some sources, there was a short firefight, while others say that the rebels only shot into the air. In either case, the situation quickly calmed down, with mutineers in full control of the town. A number of rogue soldiers also drove into Korhogo, which was seized without any resistance. Fighting was also reported at Daoukro and Odienné. Though the soldiers at the economic capital Abidjan initially remained calm, many of them also mutinied in the night, so that by the end of 6 January, the mutineers had taken control of five cities, including Abidjan. UN peacekeepers were deployed throughout the country to keep the situation from escalating, while defence minister Alain-Richard Donwahi said he would negotiate with the rebels at Bouaké on the next day.

Most of the revolting soldiers were former members of the Forces Nouvelles de Côte d'Ivoire, a rebel movement which had controlled the northern part of the country until the Second Ivorian Civil War, after which they had been integrated into the regular armed forces. The outbreak of mutinies was also related to the power games at the head of the state: Guillaume Soro, the former spokesman of the rebellion, had just lost his position of second-to-the president man.

By the next day, the revolt had spread to nine cities: Bouaké, Abidjan, Odienné, Korhogo, Man, Daloa, Toulépleu, Abobo, and Daoukro. In Abidjan, the mutineers went on to take control of and then blockade the military headquarters including the defence ministry with makeshift barricades, and also reportedly attacked a military base belonging to loyalist paratrooper commandos. Fearing the violence could further escalate, Abidjan residents stocked up on food and water. Gunfire was also reported at Man and Bouaké. Donwahi, along with Lt-Col Issiaka Ouattara, deputy commander of the loyalist Republican Guard, went to Bouaké in the early afternoon to negotiate with the rebelling soldiers. They managed to reach a deal with the rebels, who promised to end the mutiny and return to their barracks in return for the promise of higher wages and bonuses. President Alassane Ouattara then went on to say on national television that an agreement had been reached, though criticized the soldiers for their actions: "I would like to say that this manner of making demands is not appropriate. It tarnishes the image of our country after all our efforts to revive the economy."

Despite this, a large group of mutineers remained unsatisfied with the deal. These rebels consequently opened fire on the house where the negotiations took place, and declared that they wanted their bonuses to be paid immediately instead of in the following week. A standoff ensued, with the government representatives, including the defence minister, effectively held hostage for several hours. Early on 8 January, however, the mutineers released all hostages.

Though the contents of the agreement were not published, the soldiers were reportedly promised higher salaries as well as an amnesty for all mutineers. On 9 January, president Ouattara relieved the heads of the army, police and paramilitary gendarmes of command, including chief of staff Soumaila Bakayoko who had been responsible for integrating ex-rebels into the Armed Forces.

=== Subsequent mutinies ===
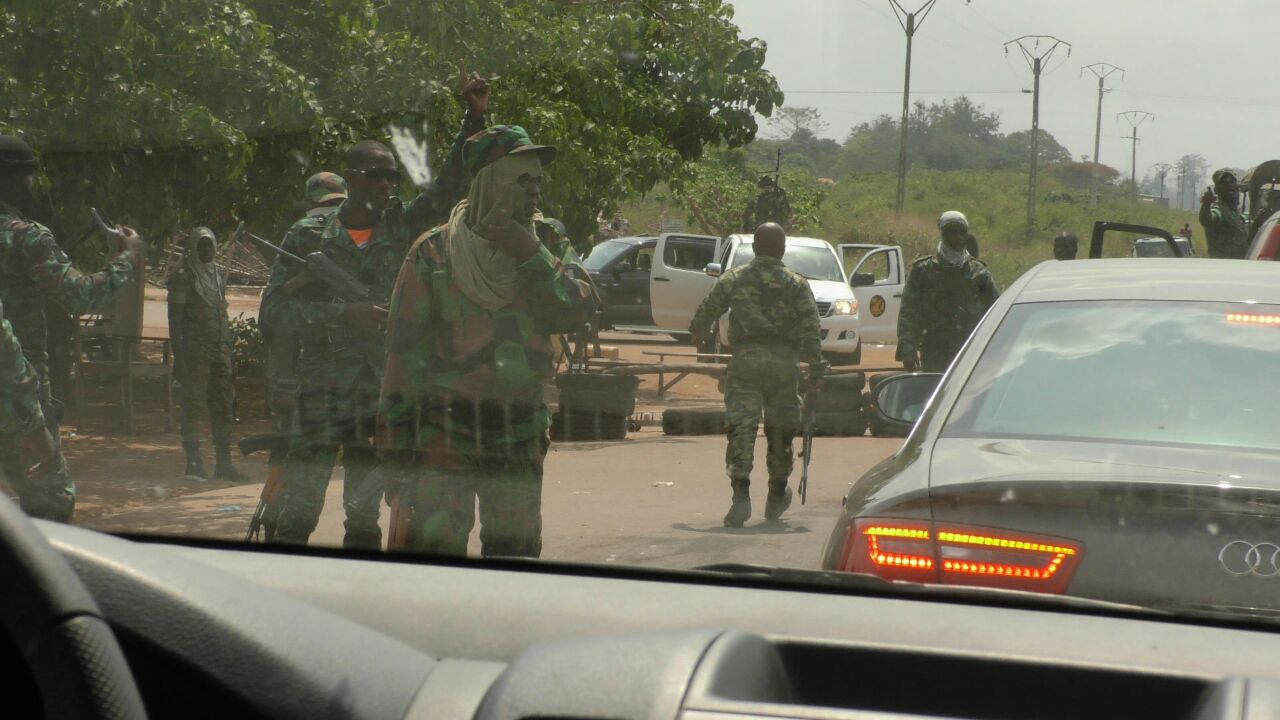
Mutineers in Yamassoukro, 17 January 2017.

On 17 January, new mutinies began in Yamassoukro, Bouaké, Man, Dimbokro and Daloa. The mutineers from Yamassoukro were not former rebels but wanted similar financial bonuses. In Bouake, the gendarmes also demanded to be included in the accord. In Yamoussoukro, four people were shot, including at least two mutineers killed by the Republican Guard. On 7 February 2017, underpaid soldiers of the Special Forces rebelled to demand their inclusion in the January agreements.

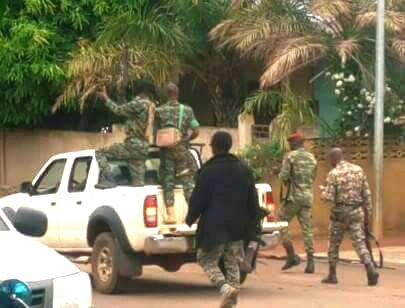
Mutineers in the streets of Bondoukou, 13 May.

On 8 May, hundreds of demobilized soldiers demanded the money and the civilian jobs they were promised in January. On 12 May, they were joined by the ex-mutineers that remained in the armed forces. At least eight civilians protesting against the mutiny were shot in Bouaké and Korhogo. A demobilised mutineer was also killed on 14 May but the Republican Guard soldiers were reluctant to fight their former colleagues. On May 14, a vast load of ammunitions was discovered in the house of a close relative of Guillaume Soro in Bouaké. Guillaume Soro publicly condemned the rebels on 28 May, claiming that their mutiny was an "humiliation for us - the state, the president, myself and the institutions".

== Aftermath ==
The mutiny reduced investor confidence in the "Ivorian miracle", the economic prosperity that Ivory Coast displayed after the end of the Civil War.
