= Military ranks of Ivory Coast =

The Military ranks of Ivory Coast are the military insignia used by the Armed Forces of Ivory Coast. Being a former colony of France, Ivory Coast shares a rank structure similar to that of France which in this case are in vertical rather than horizontal stripes for officers and warrant officers, unlike those in other Francophone national armed forces in Africa.

== Commissioned officer ranks ==
The rank insignia of commissioned officers.

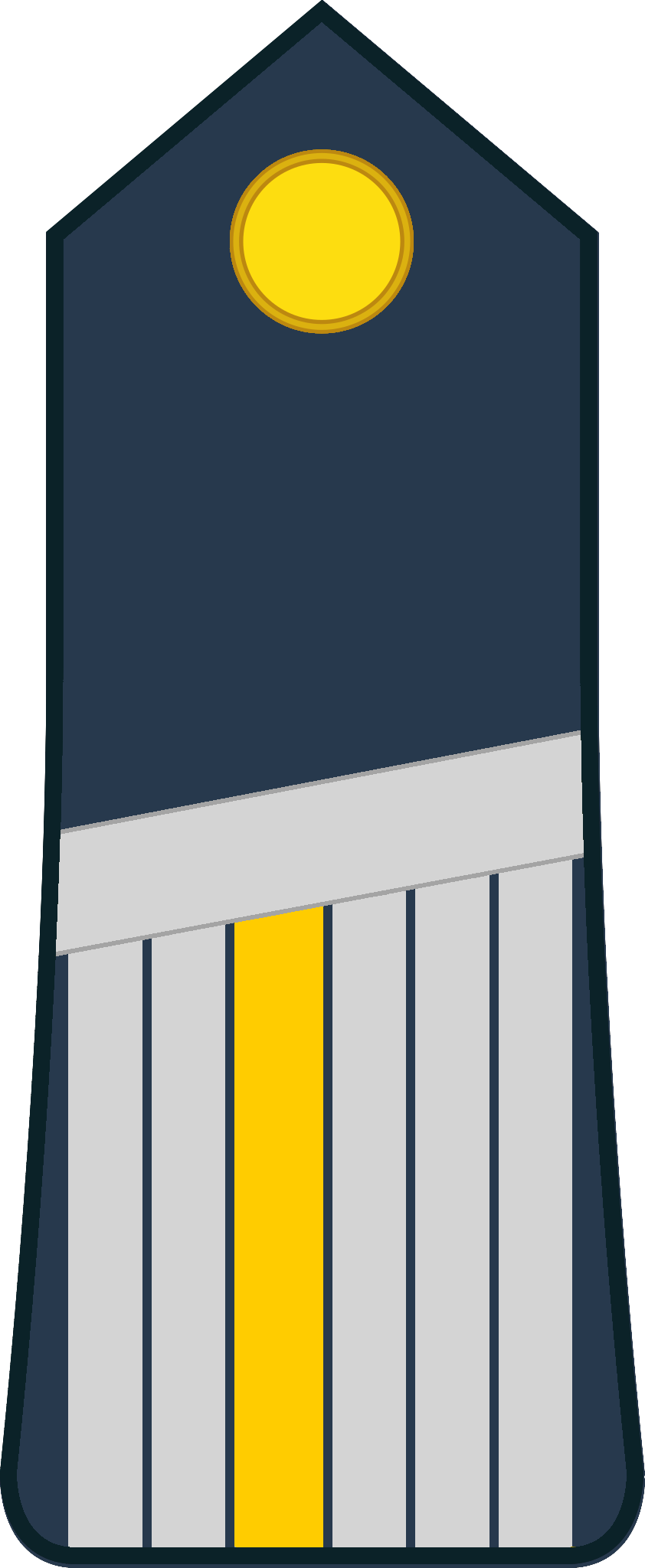
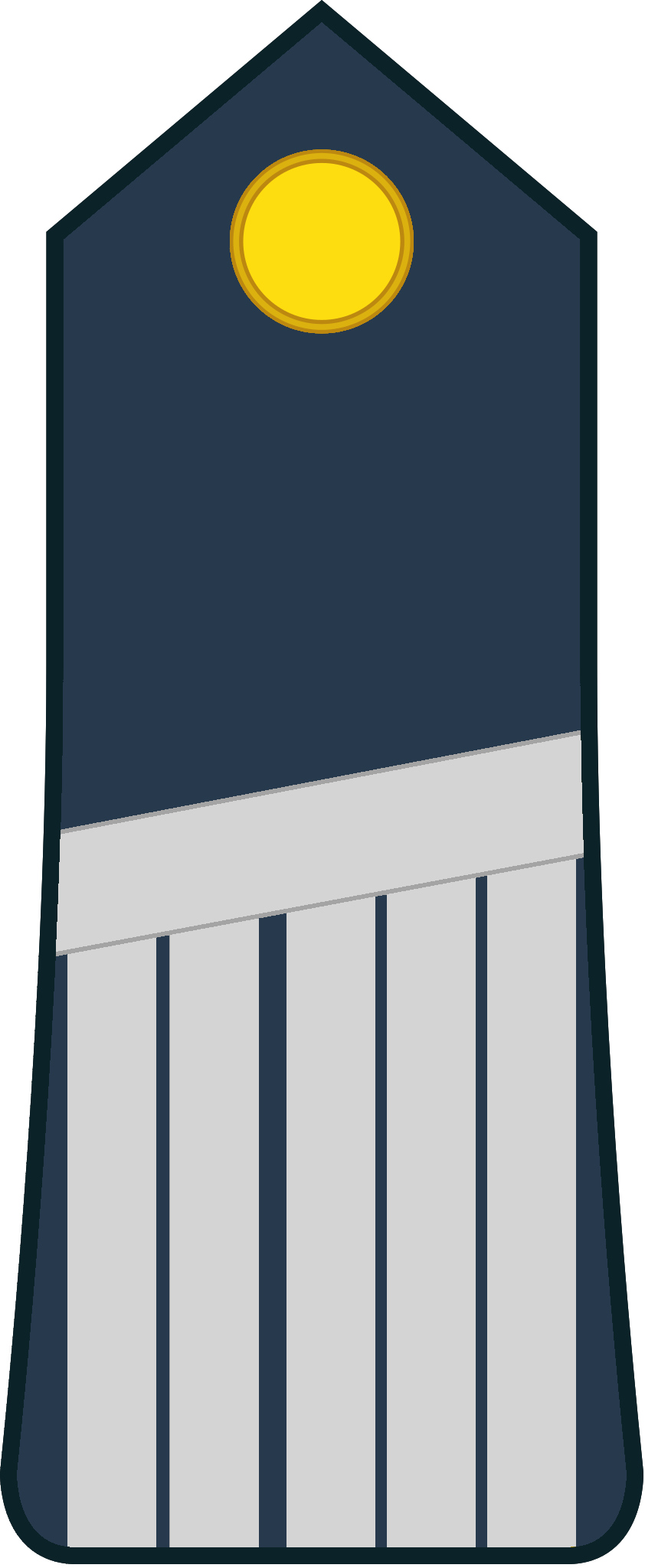
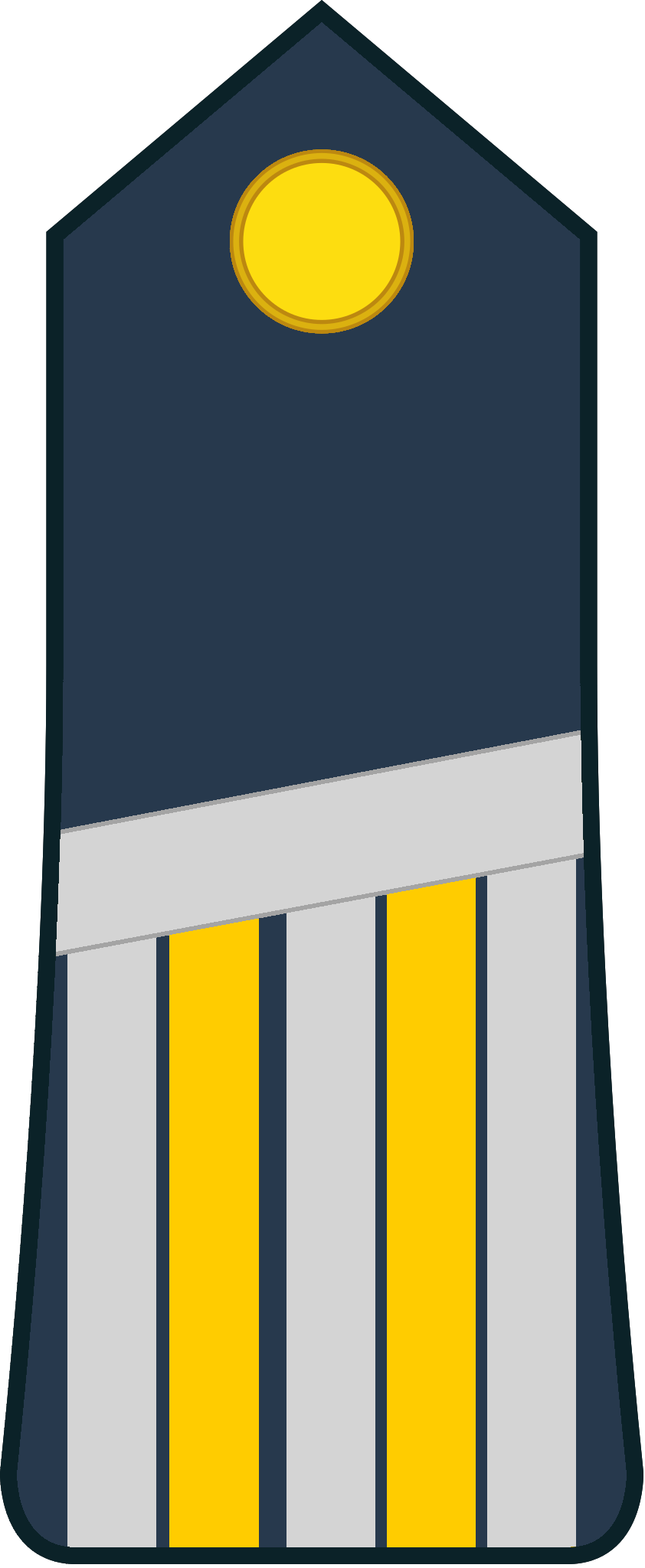
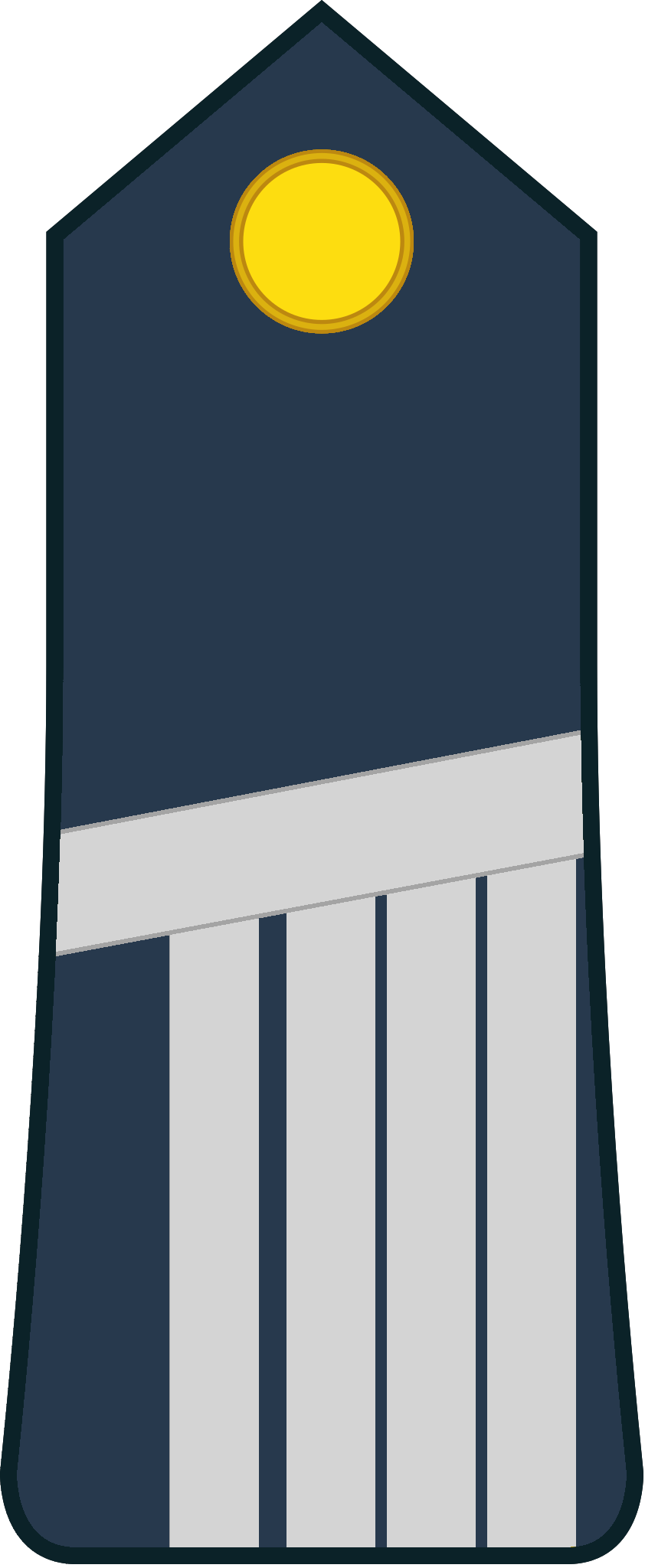
Rank group	General / flag officers				Senior officers				Junior officers
Ivory Coast Ground Forces
Ivory Coast Ground Forces	Général d'armée	Général de corps d'armée	Général de division	Général de brigade	Colonel-major	Colonel	Lieutenant-colonel	Commandant	Capitaine	Lieutenant	Sous-lieutenant
Navy of Ivory Coast
Navy of Ivory Coast	Amiral	Vice-amiral d'escadre	Vice-amiral	Contre-amiral	Capitaine de vaisseau major	Capitaine de vaisseau	Capitaine de frégate	Capitaine de corvette	Lieutenant de vaisseau	Enseigne de vaisseau de 1^{re} classe	Enseigne de vaisseau de 2^{e} classe
Ivory Coast Air Force
Ivory Coast Air Force	Général d'armée	Général de corps d'armée	Général de division	Général de brigade	Colonel-major	Colonel	Lieutenant-colonel	Commandant	Capitaine	Lieutenant	Sous-lieutenant
Ivory Coast Gendarmerie
Ivory Coast Gendarmerie	Général d'armée	Général de corps d'armée	Général de division	Général de brigade	Colonel-major	Colonel	Lieutenant-colonel	Chef D'Escadron	Capitaine	Lieutenant	Sous-lieutenant
Rank group	General / flag officers				Senior officers				Junior officers

=== Student officer ranks ===
Rank group	Student officer
Ivory Coast Ground Forces
Navy of Ivory Coast
Ivory Coast Air Force
	Aspirant

== Other ranks ==
The rank insignia of non-commissioned officers and enlisted personnel.

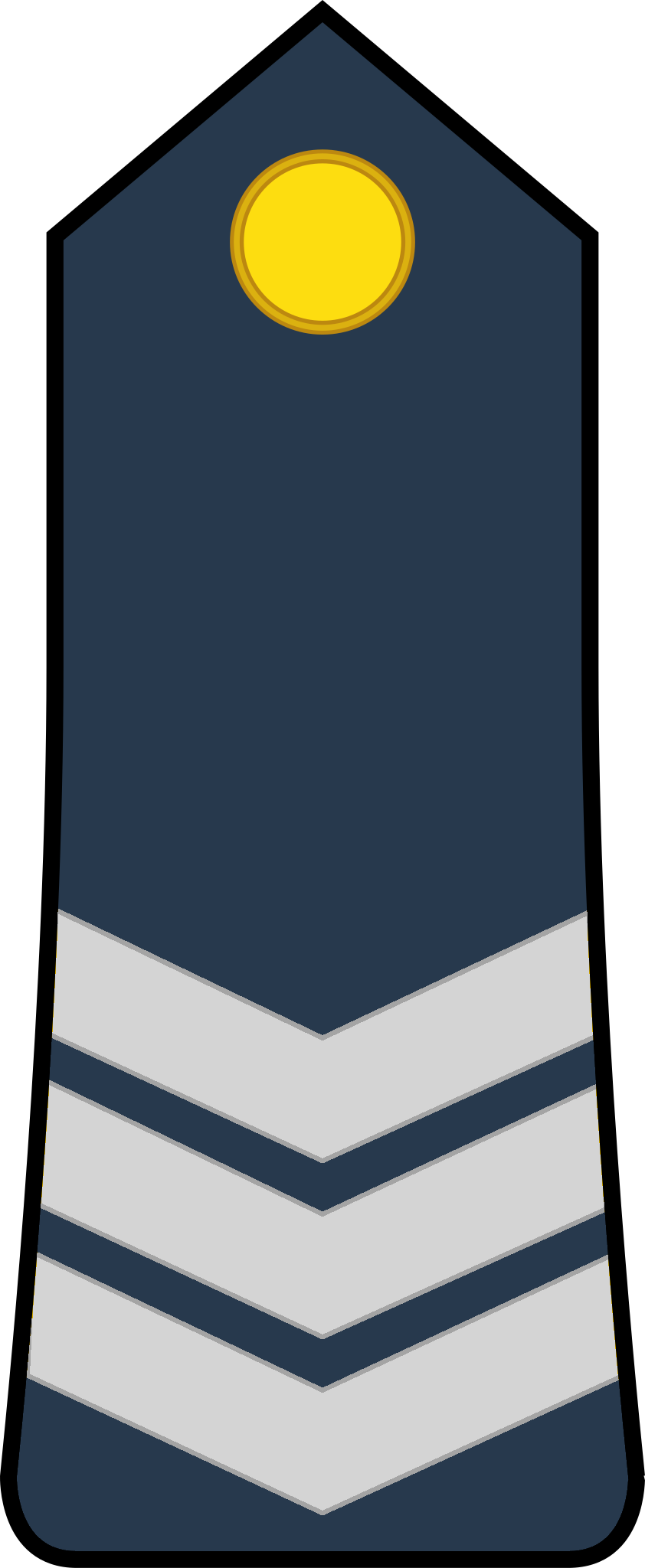
Rank group	Senior NCOs					Junior NCOs		Enlisted
Ivory Coast Ground Forces
Ivory Coast Ground Forces	Adjudant-chef major	Adjudant-chef	Adjudant	Sergent-chef	Sergent	Caporal-chef	Caporal	Soldat de première classe	Soldat de seconde classe
Navy of Ivory Coast
Navy of Ivory Coast	Maitre-principal major	Maitre-principal	Premier maitre	Maitre	Second maitre	Quartier-maitre de 1^{ère} classe	Quartier-maitre de 2^{ème} classe	Matelot de 1^{ère} classe	Matelot de 2^{ème} classe
Ivory Coast Air Force
Ivory Coast Air Force	Adjudant-chef major	Adjudant-chef	Adjudant	Sergent-chef	Sergent	Caporal-chef	Caporal	Soldat de première classe	Soldat de seconde classe
Ivory Coast Gendarmerie
Ivory Coast Gendarmerie	Adjudant-chef major	Adjudant-chef	Adjudant	Maréchal des Logis-Chef	Maréchal des Logis	Brigadier-Chef	Brigadier	Gendarme élève
Rank group	Senior NCOs					Junior NCOs		Enlisted
