= 2004 French–Ivorian clashes =

Subconflict of the First Ivorian Civil War

Ivorian-French clashes of 2004
- Part of the Ivorian Civil War and Opération Licorne
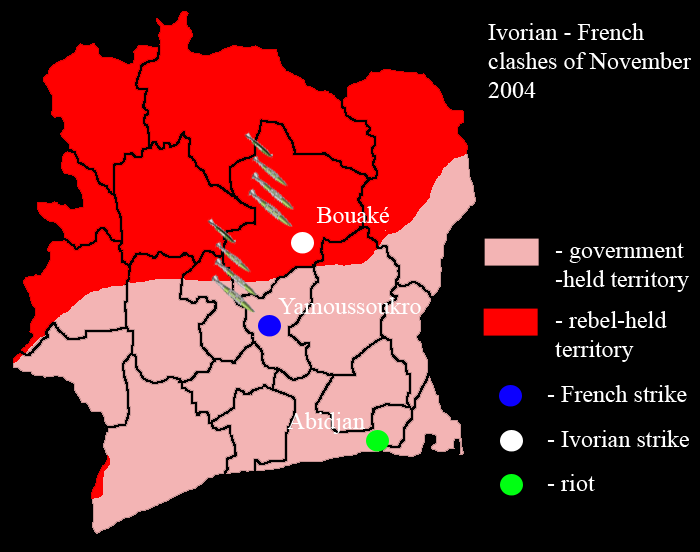
- Map (click to enlarge)
Date	6–7 November 2004
Location	Côte d'Ivoire
Result	French Victory

Belligerents
Côte d'Ivoire (Belarus) Belarusian mercenaries	France	(Ivory Coast) Forces Nouvelles de Côte d'Ivoire

Commanders and leaders
(Ivory Coast) Laurent Gbagbo (Ivory Coast) Philippe Mangou	(France) Jacques Chirac (France) Henri Poncet	(Ivory Coast) Issiaka Ouattara

Strength
Unknown; 4-5 Su-25; 4 Mi-24; 1 Mi-8; 2 IAR 330 Puma Thousands of civilians	5,000 Peacekeepers and soldiers	Unknown

Casualties and losses
20–30 servicemen and protestors killed 150 protestors wounded 2 Su-25 heavily damaged 1 BAC Strikemaster damaged 3 helicopters destroyed 4 helicopters damaged	9 soldiers killed 40 soldiers wounded 2 vehicles destroyed 1 C-160 aircraft damaged	Unknown
- 1 US citizen killed

In 2004, an armed conflict took place between French and Côte d'Ivoire forces. On 6 November 2004, two Ivorian Air force Su-25 attack fighters launched an air attack on French peacekeepers in the northern part of Côte d'Ivoire who were stationed there as part of Opération Licorne (Unicorn), the French military operation in support of the United Nations Operation in Côte d'Ivoire (UNOCI). French military forces subsequently clashed with Ivorian troops and government-loyal mobs, destroying almost the entire Ivorian Air Force. Those incidents were followed by massive anti-French protests in Côte d'Ivoire.

== Background ==
In 2002, a civil war broke out in Côte d'Ivoire between Ivorian military and other forces loyal to Laurent Gbagbo, the Ivorian president since 2000, and rebel forces identified with the Forces Nouvelles de Côte d'Ivoire. Although most of the fighting ended by late 2004, the country remained split in two, with a rebel-held north and a government-held south.

== Ivorian attack on French forces ==
On 4 November 2004, Gbagbo ordered the counter-offensive to the rebel town of Bouaké to be backed by air strikes. France did not directly react, but on 5 November moved three Dassault Mirage F.1 jet fighters based in nearby Gabon on standby.

On 6 November, two Ivorian Sukhoi Su-25 attack aircraft, crewed by two Belarusian mercenaries and two Ivorian pilots, fired on the Ivorian rebels led by Issiaka Ouattara. One of the bombers attacked the French peacekeeping position in the town at 1 pm, killing nine French soldiers and wounding 40. An American soil scientist was also killed. Two French peacekeeping vehicles were destroyed. The Ivorian government claimed the attack on the French was unintentional, but the French insisted that the attack had been deliberate.

== Retaliation by the French and subsequent riots ==
President Jacques Chirac ordered the destruction of both Ivorian jets responsible for the attack. At 2:20 pm, the Su-25s landed at Abidjan airport and were damaged by MILAN missiles fired by soldiers of the 2nd Marine Infantry Regiment, garrisoned at the airport. The French were then attacked by an Ivorian Mil Mi-24 helicopter gunship, but repelled it with machine gun fire.

At 3 pm, armed mobs of Ivorians loyal to the government took to the streets of Abidjan to protest against France and began to mass near the airport and the 43rd Marine Infantry Battalion base. At Abidjan's airport, French and Ivorian troops exchanged fire, and a French Transall C-160 military transport plane was damaged by RPGs at 4 pm. Two remaining Ivorian Su-25s, one BAC Strikemaster and one Mi-8 were damaged while three helicopters (2 Mi-24 and 1 IAR 330 Puma) were completely destroyed on direct orders from General Henri Poncet, before Ivorian protesters entered the terminal.

On 7 November, thousands of Ivorian loyalists attacked a French school and army base. Crowds of young Ivorians attacked a residential district made up of French citizens, which had to be evacuated by airlift as mobs burst into their apartment buildings. Armoured cars carried armed protesters to join the fight, and French helicopters flew over Abidjan and dropped concussion grenades, while French armoured vehicles carried troops to put down the riots. Protesters erected burning roadblocks, and French gunboats were positioned beneath the bridges. Fighting continued, and, by Sunday, French forces were still not in control of the city. As the riots in the streets continued, French soldiers opened fire on Ivorian rioters; the French government stated that 20 were killed while Ivorian authorities placed the death toll at 60. At Duékoué and in the northern suburbs of Abidjan, French reinforcements and Ivorian troops exchanged fire, and Ivorian soldiers and civilians were killed.

French forces evacuated nearly 5,000 foreign nationals from Ivory Coast in the first half of November. The United Nations Security Council unanimously passed an arms embargo on the country on 15 November 2004.

French Foreign Minister Michel Barnier stated President Gbagbo was "personally responsible for what has happened", and declared that the violence was "unexplainable, unjustifiable". Ivorian National Assembly President Mamadou Koulibaly told state television: "Ivory Coast has become an overseas territory in Jacques Chirac's head".

== Aftermath ==
France reportedly let the two foreign pilots leave the country in a group consisting of fifteen Russian, Belarusian and Ukrainian mercenaries. Questions were subsequently raised about possible French manipulation. In April 2021, a French tribunal issued life sentences, in absentia, to one Belarusian mercenary pilot and two Ivorian co-pilots for the attacks.

Côte d'Ivoire had begun rebuilding its air force with help from Belarus and Ukraine a year after the French attack. In 2005 UN gave permission to Ivorian government for the transport and repairs of both heavily damaged Su-25, one Strikemaster and one Mi-24. The assorted equipment of the aircraft were discovered at the former residence of Félix Houphouët-Boigny by Alassane Ouattara in April 2011, at the end of the post-electoral conflict which saw Gbagbo ousted.

French judge Brigitte Raynaud issued an international arrest warrant for the two pilots suspected of the bombing, Patrice Ouei and Ange-Magloire Gnanduillet, in January 2006. An Ivorian military court was also seeking to find former defence minister Rene Amani and the former head of the loyalist army, Mathias Doué, over the bombing. By 2008, relations between Côte d'Ivoire and France had returned to normal, with French foreign minister Bernard Kouchner being the first French foreign minister to visit since 2004.

== Littérature ==
- Сергей Франчук. По следам наших птиц: Война в стране кокао // История авиации : журнал — № 3. — 2005. — с. 63-68.
