= Belarusian mercenaries in Ivory Coast =

The Belarusian mercenaries in Côte d'Ivoire are a group of former career pilots and technicians of the Armed Forces of Belarus. They were sent under the alleged patronage of the French and Belarusian authorities to assist the government army of Laurent Gbagbo in the First Ivorian Civil War.

Belarusians were engaged in retraining African pilots who had previously flown the French Dassault/Dornier Alpha Jet to operate Soviet Su-25 attack aircraft. The Ivorians made only three sorties with their foreign instructors. During the latter, they attacked the French base in Bouake. The incident led to the capture of the Yamoussoukro airfield by French troops and the performances of the Young Patriots militia in Abidjan.

After that, the Belarusians immediately left the country. Years later, a criminal case was opened against them on the fact of the murder of servicemen. One of the mercenaries, Yuri Sushkin, was sentenced to life imprisonment in absentia.

At that time, in addition to citizens of Belarus, there were also hired aviation specialists from France, South Africa, Russia and Ukraine in Ivory Coast.

== Literature ==
- Stijn Mitzer and Joost Oliemans. Ivory Coast's Su-25s — The Sharks Won't Bite Again // Oryxspioenkop : website of defense analytics and military operations research. — 31 March 2021.
- Сергей Франчук. По следам наших птиц: Война в стране какао // История авиации : журнал — No. 3. — 2005. — с. 63–68.
