= Ivorian Republican Guard =

Republican Guard
- Garde républicaine de Côte d'Ivoire
- Active: 1 October 1985
- Country: Ivory Coast
- Branch: Armed Forces of the Republic of Ivory Coast
- Type: Republican Guard
- Role: Protection of government officials and installations
- Size: 2,500 personnel
- Garrison/HQ: Abidjan

The Ivorian Republican Guard (French: Garde républicaine de Côte d'Ivoire) is an independent military formation in the Ivory Coast that is responsible for protection of government officials and buildings. It is one of the most well equipped units in the Armed Forces of the Republic of Ivory Coast.

== History ==
In early 2017, President Alassane Ouattara promoted two former rebel commanders who sided with the government during the talks. The mutiny resulted two mutineers being killed by the Republican Guard. In May 2017, soldiers in the guard revolted over a pay dispute.

== Description ==
The Republican Guard (GR) support the military cabinet of the Presidency of the Republic in the same way as the Presidential Security Grouping (GSPR), the elements of which come from the land forces. The Republican Guard is responsible for security and honor missions for the benefit of the high authorities of the State and institutions. It is the only armed force authorized in national palaces. The guards are present at the Presidential Palace in Abidjan, the Senate and the National Assembly in Yamoussoukro, and the office of the Prime Minister and in the main ministries. Led by a general of the army corps, it is composed of a general staff, and 2 Groupings (one in Abidjan and one in Yamoussoukro), consisting of 2,500 men.

== Republican Guard Band ==
It was on 1 October 1985 that the band was created with 65 volunteers at its beginning their duties in early December 1987. Today, it includes 100 musicians distributed in 3 ensembles: harmony, fanfare drums and orchestra. Its mission is to ensure military honors during the travels of the President of the Republic. It has commonly been associated with the French Republican Guard Band and has received French training as well. The current head of the band is Vladimir Any-Grah.
