= Ivorian Human Rights League =

The Ivorian Human Rights League (French: Ligue ivoirienne des droits de l'homme; LIDHO) is a human rights organization in Côte d'Ivoire, founded on 21 March 1987 by René Degni-Segui. LIDHO is present in almost all major cities in Côte d'Ivoire.

== See also ==
- Politics of Côte d'Ivoire
- Universal Declaration of Human Rights
