= Gouessesso =

- Village
- Location in Ivory Coast
- Coordinates: 7°46′N 7°39′W
- Country: Ivory Coast
- District: Montagnes
- Region: Tonkpi
- Department: Biankouma
- Sub-prefecture: Biankouma
- Time zone: UTC+0 (GMT)

Gouessesso is a village in western Ivory Coast. It is in the sub-prefecture of Biankouma, Biankouma Department, Tonkpi Region, Montagnes District.
