= Armed Forces of the Republic of Ivory Coast =

Combined military forces of Ivory Coast

Armed Forces of Côte d'Ivoire
- Forces Armées de Cote d'Ivoire
- Republic of Ivory Coast Coat of arms
- Service branches: Army; Air Force; Navy; National Gendarmerie; Republican Guard

Leadership
- Commander-in-Chief: President Alassane Ouattara
- Minister of Defense: Téné Birahima Ouattara
- Chief of the Defence Staff: Army corps general Lassina Doumbia

Personnel
- Active personnel: 22,000 (estimate as of 2017)

Expenditure
- Budget: US$94 million (fiscal year 1996); >US$541 million (fiscal year 2009)
- Percent of GDP: 1.5% (fiscal year 2009)

Related articles
- History: First Ivorian Civil War; Second Ivorian Civil War
- Ranks: Military ranks of Ivory Coast

The Armed Forces of Côte d'Ivoire (French: Forces Armées de Cote d'Ivoire; "FACI") are the armed forces of Ivory Coast, first formed after the country's independence in 1960.

== History ==
The Ivorian military has its roots in the colonial armed forces of French West Africa, which were headquartered in Dakar, Senegal but possessed bases in several distinct military regions. Most Ivorian recruits who joined the colonial army were assigned to Senegalese units during this period, such as the Senegalese Tirailleurs. They served with distinction during both world wars, with 20,000 Ivorian soldiers fighting for the French during World War I and another 30,000 during World War II. In 1950, the French government began the process of setting up a specific defence force for the colony, consisting of four infantry companies and a light armoured unit.

The Ivory Coast became independent on 7 August 1960. In April 1961, the new government signed the Franco-Ivorian Technical Military Assistance Accord with France, which compelled the latter to assist with the formation of a new national military. It also authorised the continued presence of French troops based in Port-Bouët, and permitted the government to call on French military assistance in the event of external aggression or major internal unrest. By the end of 1962, the fledgling Ivorian armed forces had expanded rapidly into 5,000 soldiers attached to four battalions. Most of the initial recruits were drawn from the defunct colonial military establishment and had served in various French units, particularly the marine regiments. They were armed with old equipment donated by France, including two Max Holste Broussard monoplanes, a single Douglas DC-3 cargo aircraft, fifteen M8 Greyhound armoured cars, and even a SC-497-class submarine chaser. Conscription was instituted, although the large number of volunteers and low manpower requirements ensured it was only applied selectively. Some of the senior positions in the officer corps and Ministry of Defence continued to be held by French nationals.

Since the Ivory Coast could ill afford to divert funds from its economic development programmes into the armed forces, and was already dependent on France for its external defence, the military establishment remained quite modest from 1961 to 1974. Defence spending increased between 1974 and 1987, and the armed forces increased to 14,920 men. During this period, the air force and navy embarked on a significant modernisation campaign. An international merchant marine training academy was built in Abidjan and trained personnel from several Economic Community of West African States (ECOWAS) governments.

In 1997, a collapse in civil-military relations became evident when President Henri Konan Bédié dismissed popular general Robert Guéï on suspicion of disloyalty. Two years later, an army mutiny led by disgruntled recruits and junior officers escalated into a major coup d'état which ousted Bédié and installed Guéï in his place. Guéï subsequently stood for office during a subsequent presidential election, although he attempted to annul the election results when Laurent Gbagbo secured the popular vote. This triggered a civil revolt in Abidjan and two days of street battles between Gbagbo supporters and soldiers loyal to Guéï. Most of the armed forces remained neutral until the third day, when the army's elite units and the gendarmerie announced they would recognise Gbagbo as president of the republic. Guéï conceded defeat, going into exile on 29 October 2000.

In September 2002, the Ivory Coast endured a second army mutiny, this time by 750 Muslim soldiers who seized Bouaké, citing religious discrimination and grievances against the predominantly Christian government. The mutineers later took control of most of the northern administrative regions, carrying out a brutal campaign of ethnic cleansing and plunging the country into civil war. For a number of years, troops dispatched by France, ECOWAS, and a United Nations Operation in Côte d'Ivoire (ONUCI) effort enforced a buffer zone between the south and the rebel-held north.

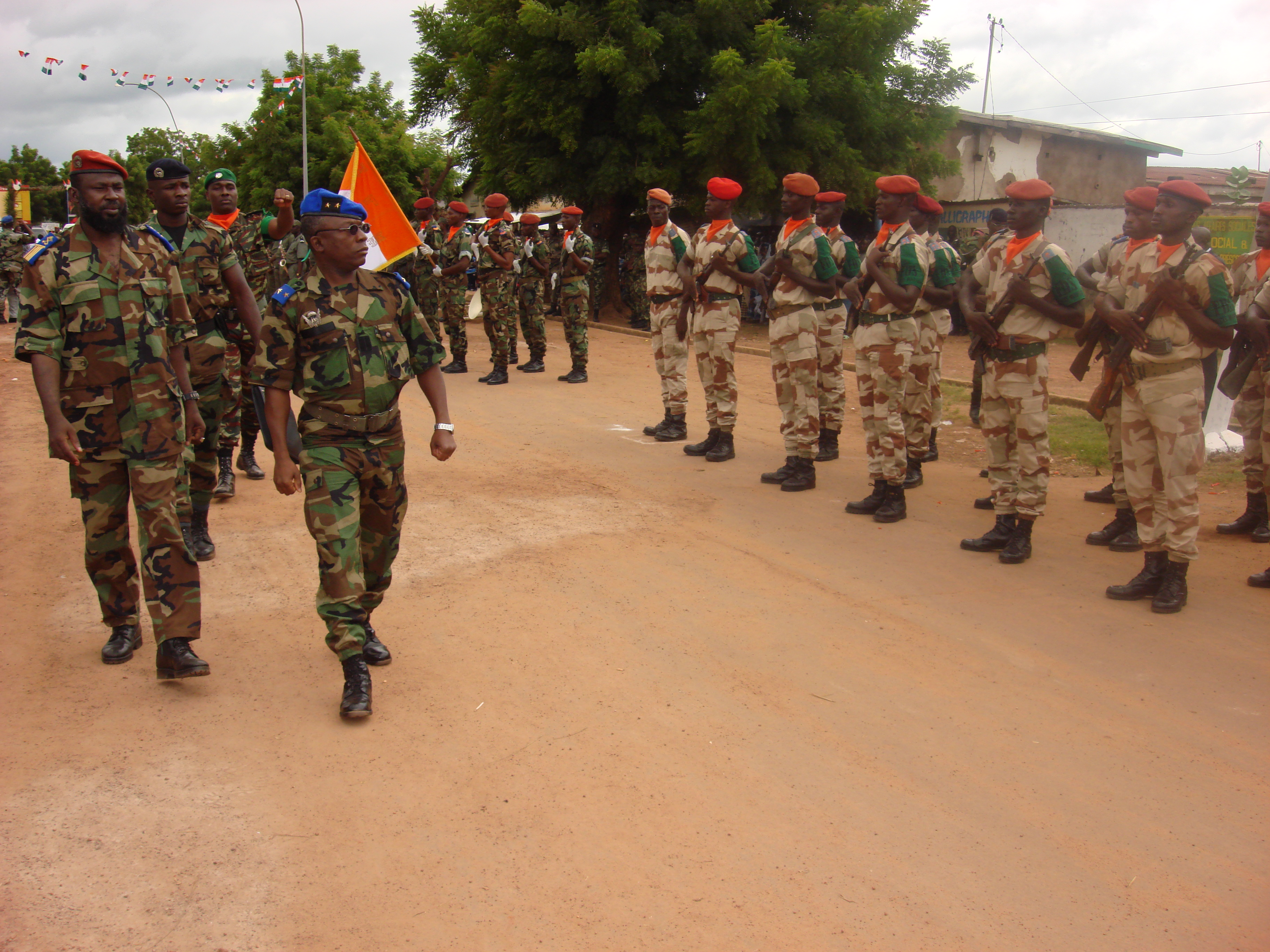
Soumaila Bakayoko (blue cap), Chief of Staff of the Army, conducts a review of his troops in Odienné

President Gbagbo repeatedly demanded France assist him in crushing the rebel forces. France maintained it would not take sides in the civil war, but allowed Ivorian military aircraft to cross the buffer zone and attack rebel positions. In November 2004, an Ivorian pilot targeted a French base during an air strike on Bouaké, killing nine French soldiers. The French retaliated by launching a follow-up operation to destroy the Ivorian Air Force.

In March 2011, a rebel coalition, the Forces Nouvelles de Côte d'Ivoire, launched a renewed offensive on the south with French support, sparking a second civil war. The Ivorian army was quickly overwhelmed, and Gbagbo deposed by the rebels. The Forces Nouvelles established a new national military, known as the Republican Forces of Ivory Coast (FRCI).

Integration problems arising from the incorporation of various rebel factions into the FRCI, as well as former Gbagbo loyalists, continue to persist. In 2014, some army units launched an abortive mutiny over wage disputes. The crisis ended when the Ivorian political leadership agreed to a new financial settlement with the FRCI. A second mutiny occurred on 7 January 2017, with troops in Bouaké demanding higher salaries and improved living conditions; this resulted in a second financial settlement.

== Army ==
=== Organization ===
Ivory Coast military units and base in 2008
Source: Jane's World Armies Issue 23 – 2008
Numbers in brackets indicate parent military regions.
Note: French forces of battalion strength are stationed near Abidjan, as well as over 7,000 troops under U.N. command. In 2011, rebel forces overran the country during the Second Ivorian Civil War.

The Ivorian army had three infantry battalions, an armoured battalion, an artillery battery, and seven specialist companies in 1993. The effective strength of the army was about 3,000 troops for the first ten years of Ivorian independence, increasing to over 8,000 in the mid-1980s before declining steadily to about 5,500. It has always remained the largest branch of the armed forces.

In 1987, the army was responsible for the country's five military regions, each of which was supervised by a colonel. The First Military Region controlled the concentration of forces in and around Abidjan, its principal units there being a rapid intervention battalion (airborne), an infantry battalion, an armored battalion, and an air defense artillery battalion. The Second Military Region was located in Daloa and comprised one infantry battalion. The Third Military Region was headquartered in Bouaké and was home to an artillery, an infantry, and an engineer battalion. The Fourth Military Region maintained only a Territorial Defense Company headquartered in Korhogo The Fifth Military Region was formerly known as the Western Operational Zone, a temporary command created to respond to the security threat caused by the First Liberian Civil War.

By 2010, the system of military regions had been abolished.

As of July 2011, General Soumaïla Bakayoko is the chief of staff of the army, and colonel-major Gervais Kouakou Kouassi is the Chief of the Gendarmerie.

As of October 2011, previously active units around Abidjan reportedly included the:

- 1st Infantry Battalion – (1er Bataillon d'infanterie des forces armées terrestres ivoiriennes), at Akouédo (new camp)
- Armoured Battalion – (Bataillon Blinde), at Akouédo (new camp). The new camp at Akouedo had reportedly been almost completely destroyed. Akouedo appears to be at 5' 21 7 N, 3' 26 30 W.
- 1st Parachute Commando Battalion – 1er Bataillon des Commandos Parachutistes (1er BCP), old camp at Akouedo, on the route to the village Ébrié.

The 2nd Infantry Battalion appears to have been based at Daloa for some time. A 2003 change of command ushered in the 16th commander of the unit, and there are also reports from 2009 and 2011.

Reported special forces units include:

- Group des Forces Speciales (GFS)
- Fusiliers Commandos d Air (FUSCOA)
- Détachement d' Intervention Rapide
- Fusiliers Marins Commandos (FUMACO/ naval commandos)

=== Current army equipment ===
The Ivorian army has traditionally been equipped with French weapons, most of which were delivered in the 1980s under military grants from French government. During Laurent Gbagbo's administration (2000–2011), large quantities of second-hand Soviet arms were acquired from Angola, Ukraine, and Belarus.

== Air Force ==
Roundel of Côte d'Ivoire

After achieving independence from France in 1960, Ivory Coast maintained strong links with France through bilateral defence agreements. French training and operating techniques have been used since the establishment of the air force. The first aircraft were supplied in 1961 and included three Douglas C-47s and seven MH.1521 Broussard STOL utility aircraft. The first jet aircraft entered service in October 1980 which were six Alpha Jet CI light attack and advanced training aircraft; six more were ordered, but this was subsequently cancelled. However, another was purchased in 1983.

The 1979 air force had only transport and liaison aircraft. In 1987, the Library of Congress Country Study said that the Air Force's official name, Ivoirian Air Transport and Liaison Group (Groupement Aérien de Transport et de Liaison—GATL), "reflects an original mission focused more on logistics and transport rather than a combat force."

In 2004, following an air strikes on French peacekeepers by Ivorian forces, the French military destroyed all aircraft of the Air Force of Ivory Coast. President Gbagbo had previously ordered air strikes on Ivorian rebels as part of the civil war. On 6 November 2004, at least one Ivorian Sukhoi Su-25 bomber attacked a French peacekeeping position in the rebel town of Bouaké at 1 pm, killing nine French soldiers and wounding 31. An American development worker, reported to have been a missionary, was also killed. The Ivorian government claimed the attack on the French was unintentional, but the French insisted that the attack had been deliberate.

Several hours after the attack, French President Jacques Chirac ordered the destruction of the Ivorian air force and the seizure of Yamoussoukro airport. The French military performed an overland attack on the airport, destroying two Sukhoi Su-25 ground attack aircraft and three Mi-24 helicopter gunships. Two more military helicopters were destroyed during combat in the skies over Abidjan. France then flew in 300 troops and three Dassault Mirage F1 jet fighters based in nearby Gabon on standby.

Since then, the Air Force of Ivory Coast has been rebuilt. In 2007, Aviation Week & Space Technology reported a total of six aircraft in service: one Antonov An-32 tactical transport, one Cessna 421 Golden Eagle utility aircraft, two Eurocopter SA 365 Dauphin helicopters, one Gulfstream IV VIP aircraft, and one Mil Mi-24 attack helicopter. It is unknown whether any of these aircraft were truly operational. In addition, Deagel.com reported two Mikoyan-Gurevich MiG-23 attack aircraft.

=== Aircraft ===
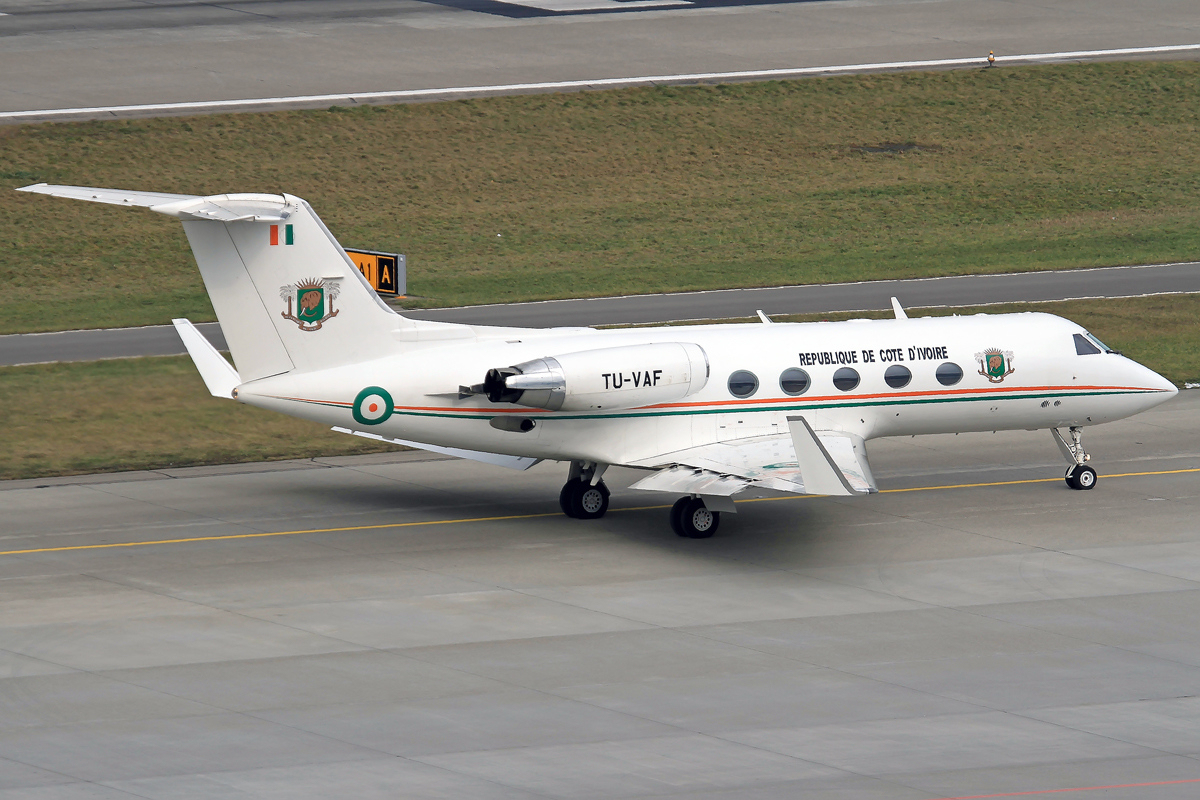
A Côte d'Ivoire Gulfstream G-IV

Aircraft	Origin	Type	Variant	In service	Notes
Attack
K-8 Karakorum	China	Trainer		0(3)	3 on order
Reconnaissance
King Air 90	United States	Reconnaissance	90	1	
King Air 350	United States	Reconnaissance		2	
Transport
Antonov An-26	Soviet Union	Transport		2	
Beechcraft 1900	United States	Utility		1	
CASA C-295	Spain	Transport		1	1 on order
Helicopters
Mil Mi-8	Soviet Union	Utility		1	
Mil Mi-24	Soviet Union	Attack		5	
Mil Mi-17	Soviet Union	Utility		4	
AS350	France	Utility		3	
Harbin Z-9	China	Utility		0(4)	4 on order
UAV
Delair DT26	France	Surveillance		4	
Wing Loong II	China	Surveillance		2	

== Navy ==
Ivory Coast has a brown-water navy whose mission is coastal surveillance and security for the nation's 340-mile coastline. The operational capability of the navy was severely degraded due to the diversion of resources to the army and air force during the civil wars, and it remains incapable of conducting operations beyond the general vicinity of Abidjan. In 2014 they received three coastal defence vessels, and place an order for 30 inflatable boats and 10 patrol craft in 2018 from the Raidco Marine shipbuilders

Vessel name	Origin	Builder	Type	In service	Notes
Contre amiral Fadika	France		P400 class patrol vessel	2023	
Vaillance	Israël		Opv45	2023	
Espérance	Israël		Opv45	2024	
L'émergence	France		RPB33	2014	
LE Bouclier	France		RPB33	2015	
Capitane de frégate Sekongo	France		RPB33	2016	
Atchan 2	china		Predator class patrol boat	2017	
L'élephant	France	DCN Brest	Batral-E Type LSM landing craft	1977	

=== Retired ===
Early vessels were a second hand submarine chaser (SC 1337) from the United States, and three former French Navy boats (one patrol craft, with two fast attack boats).

== International forces ==
A mutual defence accord signed with France in April 1961 provided for the stationing of French Armed Forces troops in Ivory Coast. The 43rd Marine Infantry Battalion of the French Army's Troupes de Marine (43e bataillon d'infanterie de marine) was based in Port Bouet adjacent to the Abidjan Airport from 1979 and had more than 500 troops assigned until 2011, when it appears to have been disbanded. The French military also maintained a force as part of Opération Licorne.

From summer 2011, Operation Licorne, the French force, previously over 5,000 strong, was roughly 700, and consists of Licorne headquarters, Battalion Licorne (BATLIC), seemingly made up of elements of the 2nd Marine Infantry Regiment and the Régiment d'infanterie-chars de marine, and a helicopter detachment.

The French military left the country at the Ivorian's request in 2025.

The United Nations has maintained the peacekeeping mission ONUCI in the country since 2004. On 28 February 2011 ONUCI consisted of 7,568 troops, 177 military observers, and numerous international civilians and Police; the mission had received helicopter and infantry reinforcement from UNMIL during the stand-off since the late 2010 elections which had been won by Alassane Ouattara.

== National Gendarmerie ==
Since independence, the Ivory Coast has maintained a paramilitary gendarmerie force with a mandate to assist the police with law enforcement duties in the country's rural districts. However, it may also be deployed alongside the army to quell internal unrest. For a number of decades, the size of the Ivorian National Gendarmerie remained consistent at around 4,000 to 5,000 personnel, supervised by a commandant. It underwent a massive expansion following the outbreak of the First Ivorian Civil War, increasing to about 12,000 personnel commanded by a major general. Gendarmes undergo training as cadets at a National Gendarmerie Academy.

The National Gendarmerie maintains an investigative branch, the Brigades de Recherches, which has been accused of various human rights abuses, including extrajudicial killings and unlawful detention.
