= Robert Guéï =

1999–2000 military president of Côte d'Ivoire

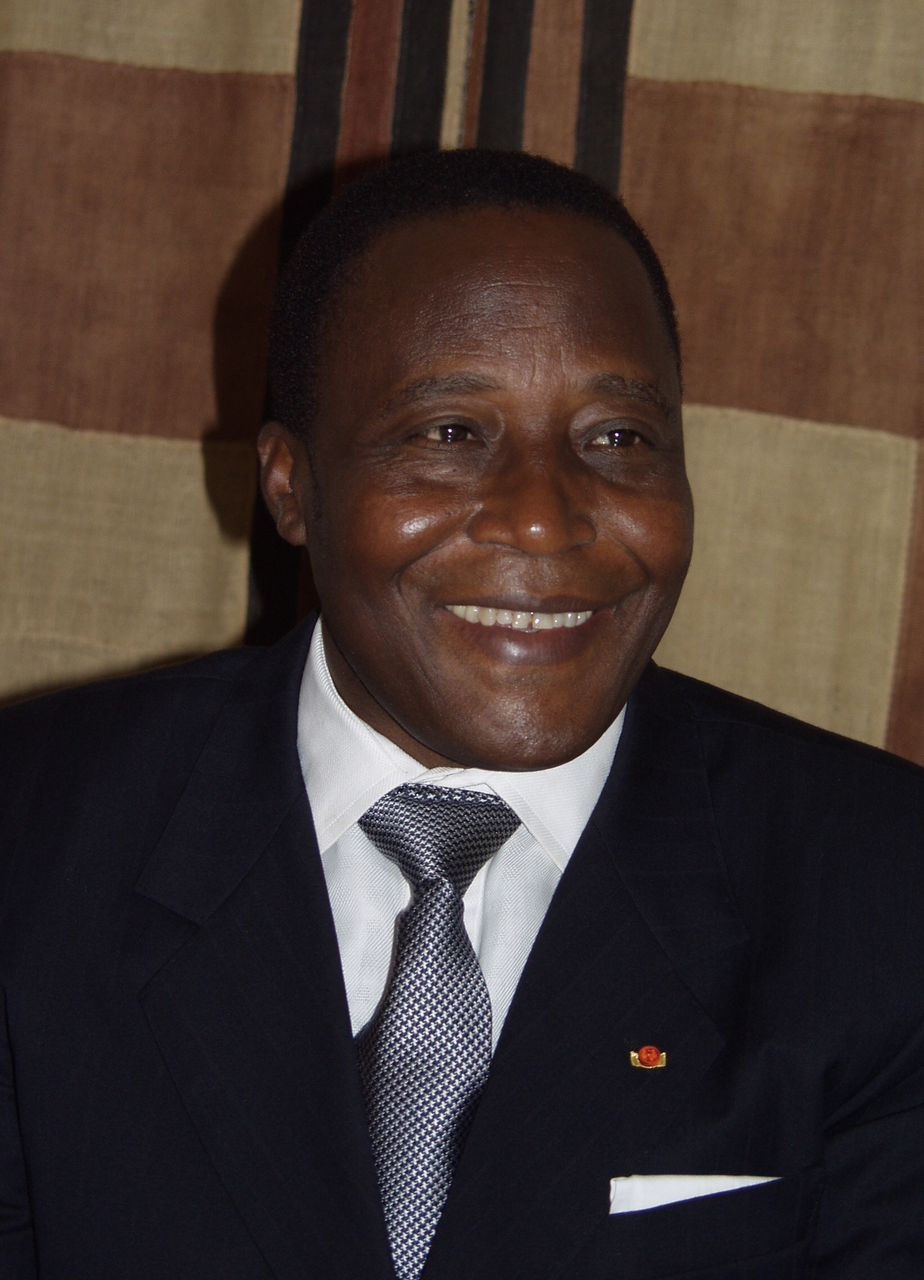

3rd President of Ivory Coast (Note: President of the National Public Salvation Committee until 4 January 2000)
- In office 24 December 1999 – 26 October 2000
- Prime Minister: Seydou Diarra
- Preceded by: Henri Konan Bédié
- Succeeded by: Laurent Gbagbo

Personal details
- Born: 16 March 1941 Man Department, French West Africa
- Died: 19 September 2002 (aged 61) Cocody, Abidjan, Ivory Coast
- Party: Independent
- Other political affiliations: Union for Democracy and Peace in Ivory Coast
- Spouse: Rose Guéï (?–2002; their deaths)

Robert Guéï (French pronunciation: [ʁɔbɛʁ ɡe.i]; 16 March 1941 – 19 September 2002) was an Ivorian politician who served as the third president of the Ivory Coast from 24 December 1999 to 26 October 2000. He succeeded President Henri Konan Bédié after the 1999 Ivorian coup d'état and lost to Laurent Gbagbo in the ensuing 2000 Ivorian presidential election. Guéï, his wife Rose Doudou Guéï, and his children were killed on 19 September 2002 on the first day of the First Ivorian Civil War.

== Biography ==
Guéï was born in Kabakouma, a village in the western Man Department, and was a member of the Yacouba ethnic community. He was a career soldier: under the French administration, he was trained at the Ouagadougou military school and the St Cyr military school in France. He was an ardent supporter of longtime President Félix Houphouët-Boigny, who in 1990, had him chief of the army following a mutiny. After the death of Houphouët-Boigny in 1993, Guéï became distanced from the new leader Henri Konan Bédié. Guéï's refusal to mobilize his troops to resolve a political struggle between Bédié and the opposition leader Alassane Ouattara in October 1995 led to his dismissal. He was made a minister but sacked again in August 1996 and forced out of the army in January 1997.

Bédié was overthrown in a coup on Christmas Eve, 1999. Although Guéï had no role in the coup, the popular general was encouraged out of retirement to head the junta until the next elections. On 4 January 2000, he became President of the Republic. Guéï stood in the October 2000 presidential election as an independent. He only allowed one opposition candidate, Laurent Gbagbo of the Ivorian Popular Front, to run against him. Guéï was soundly defeated by Gbagbo but refused to recognize the result. It took a spate of street protests to bring Gbagbo to power. Guéï fled to Gouessesso, near the Liberian border, but remained a figure in the political scene. He was included in a reconciliation forum in 2001 and agreed to refrain from undemocratic methods.

Guéï withdrew from the forum agreement in September 2002, but was killed along with his wife, former First Lady Rose Doudou Guéï, and their children on 19 September 2002, in the Cocody district of Abidjan during the first hours of the civil war. The circumstances of his death remain mysterious, although generally attributed to forces loyal to Laurent Gbagbo. Several members of his family and the interior minister, Émile Boga Doudou, were also killed.

Following Guéï's death, his body stayed in a morgue until a funeral was held for him in Abidjan on 18 August 2006, nearly four years after his death.

== See also ==
- First Ivorian Civil War

Political offices
Preceded by Henri Konan Bédié	President of Ivory Coast; 1999–2000	Succeeded by Laurent Gbagbo
