= Forces Nouvelles de Côte d'Ivoire =

Political party

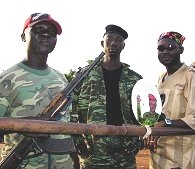
Rebel soldiers man a checkpoint, December 2005 (VOA)

The Forces Nouvelles de Côte d'Ivoire (English: New Forces of Ivory Coast; abbreviated FNCI, FN or FAFN) is a political coalition that was formed in December 2002, in the wake of the first peace accords of the Ivorian Civil War.

== Composition ==
FNCI includes these political parties:

- Patriotic Movement of Côte d'Ivoire (Mouvement patriotique de Côte d'Ivoire, MPCI)
- Ivorian Popular Movement of the Great West (Mouvement populaire ivoirien du Grand Ouest, MPIGO)
- Movement for Justice and Peace (Mouvement pour la justice et la paix, MJP)

While the political coalition under which these parties operate is formally called the Forces Nouvelles de Côte d'Ivoire, in fact the MJP has folded into the MPCI, and the MPCI stands in for the coalition itself. There is no active FNCI organization independent of the MPCI as of 2007.

The phrase Forces Nouvelles remains a shorthand for the rebel side in the civil war.

Following the signing of a peace agreement on March 4, 2007, New Forces leader Guillaume Soro became prime minister. According to Soro, the group is transforming itself from an armed movement into a force that is "responsible, credible and capable of managing the affairs of state".

== Zones ==
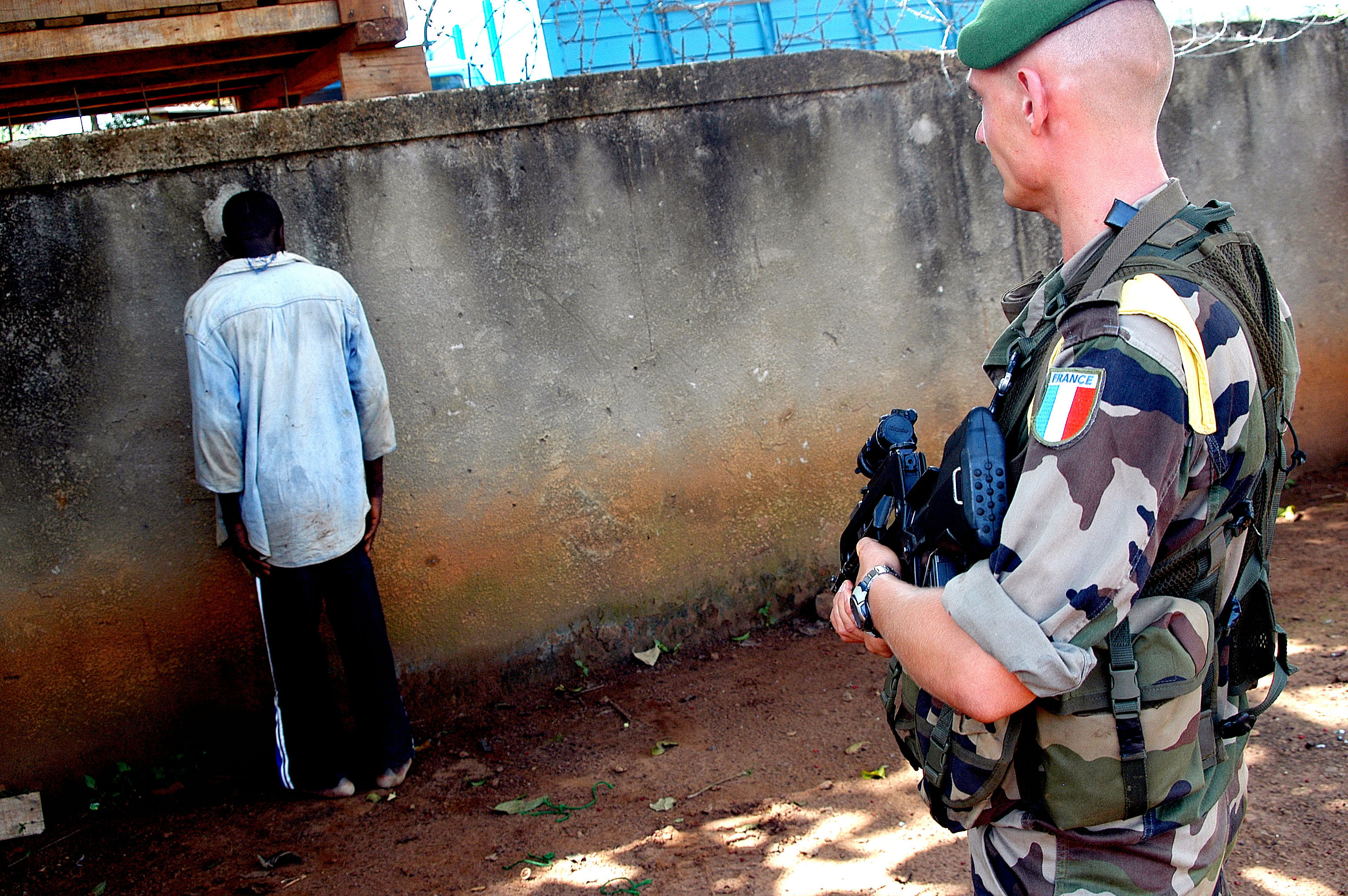
A Forces nouvelles's member caught by the French Foreign Legion in 2004 after a plundering.

The Forces Nouvelles de Côte d'Ivoire are structured in 10 zones throughout the country.

=== Zone 1: Bouna ===
The Bouna's zone covers the region of Bouna, supervised by Mourou Ouatarra, a former-boxer of the Société Omnisports de l'Armée (SOA). This zone had drawn people's attention to an important contingent of women, called Atchengué, which means let's go (French: on y va) in Mossi language.

=== Zone 2: Katiola ===
The Katiola's zone covers a region including administrative districts of Katiola, Dabakala, Niakaramandougou and Tafiré. This zone is supervised by Touré Hervé Pélikan, called Vetcho, born in Katiola and Guillaume Soro's Chief of staff. This zone, which have Che Guevarra as an idol, is an ancient part of the Garde Républicaine, of the 3rd battalion of infantry and of the transmissions service of the headquaker's national armed forces (FANCI: Forces armées nationales de Côte d'Ivoire).

=== Zone 3: Bouaké ===
The Bouaké's zone covers the region around Bouaké and is supervised by Chérif Ousmane, called "Papa Guépard" (English: Daddy Cheetah), from his unit's name "Les Guépards" (English: The Cheetahs). This zone is an ancient part of the paratrooper rapid reaction forces (Firpac: Force d'intervention rapide para-commando) and a Mathias Doué's former-driver during the military transition supervised by Robert Guéï.

=== Zone 4: Mankono ===
The Mankono's zone covers the region around Mankono, a rather landlocked area, supervised by Ouattara Zoumana, a native of Ferkessédougou, also called "Lieutenant Zoua". This zone is an ancient part of the armed forces' school (EFA: École des forces armées) of Bouaké.

=== Zone 5: Séguéla ===
The Séguéla's zone covers a region including the administrative districts of Séguéla and Vavoua. The zone 5 is supervised by Ouattara Issiaka, called "Wattao", in addition Chief of staff's assistant in the Forces Nouvelless armed forces. This zone, which supervise the "Anaconda" unit, is an ancient part of the "Société Omnisports de l'Armée" (SOA), the "Forces armées nationales de Côte d'Ivoire"'s (English: Armed forces of Côte d'Ivoire) sportive team.

=== Zone 6: Man ===
The Man's zone covers the 18 mountains region (Région des 18 Montagnes), a zone reckoned to be difficult owing to its border position with Guinea and Liberia. The zone is supervised by Losseni Fofana, called "Loss". Fofana is a former member of the paratrooper rapid reaction forces (Firpac: Force d'intervention rapide para-commando), contingent 93/2A.

=== Zone 7: Touba ===
The Touba's zone covers the region of Bafing, a bridge zone situated between Man and Odienné. The Touba's zone is supervised by Aboudrahamane Traoré, called "Dramane Touba", a former-noncommissioned officer of the FANCI. After he had soldiered in the Armed Forces School (French: École des Forces Armées), then in the 3rd battalion of Bouaké, he entered in the FNCI, in the shade of Chérif Ousmane.

== After integration into the armed forces ==
After the New Forces were mostly integrated into the Ivorian army in 2011, a large number of ex-rebels successfully mutinied for better living conditions and pay in January 2017.

== See also ==
- Ivorian Civil War
- Politics of Ivory Coast
- Patriotic Movement of Côte d'Ivoire
