= 2025–26 Real Oviedo season =

Real Oviedo
2025–26 season
- President: Martín Peláez
- Head coach: Veljko Paunović (until 9 October); Luis Carrión (9 October–14 December); Guillermo Almada (from 16 December)
- Stadium: Estadio Carlos Tartiere
- La Liga: 20th
- Copa del Rey: First round
- Top goalscorer: League: Federico Viñas (9); All: Federico Viñas (9)
- Highest home attendance: 29,758 vs Real Madrid
- Lowest home attendance: 25,688 vs Real Sociedad
- Biggest win: Celta Vigo 0–3 Oviedo
- Biggest defeat: Oviedo 0–3 Real Madrid
Home colours	Away colours	Third colours

The 2025–26 season is Real Oviedo's 100th season in existence and their first season in La Liga since 2000–01. The club will also compete in the Copa del Rey.

== Squad ==
No.	Name	Position	Nationality	Age	Joined
1	Horațiu Moldovan	GK	Romania	28	2025
13	Aarón Escandell	GK	Spain	30	2024
2	Eric Bailly	DF	Ivory Coast	32	2025
3	Rahim Alhassane	DF	Niger	24	2024
4	David Costas	DF	Spain	31	2021
12	Dani Calvo	DF	Spain	32	2021
15	Oier Luengo	DF	Spain	28	2022
22	Nacho Vidal	DF	Spain	31	2025
30	Marco Esteban	DF	Spain	20	2024
	David Carmo	DF	Angola	26	2025
	Javi López	DF	Spain	24	2025
5	Alberto Reina	MF	Spain	28	2025
6	Kwasi Sibo	MF	Ghana	28	2024
7	Ilyas Chaira	MF	Morocco	24	2025
8	Santi Cazorla	MF	Spain	41	2023
11	Santiago Colombatto	MF	Argentina	29	2023
14	Ovie Ejaria	MF	England	28	2025
17	Brandon Domingues	MF	France	25	2025
20	Leander Dendoncker	MF	Belgium	31	2025
21	Luka Ilić	MF	Serbia	26	2025
28	Lamine Gueye	MF	Senegal	21	2022
9	Federico Viñas	FW	Uruguay	27	2024
10	Haissem Hassan	FW	Egypt	24	2024
19	Álex Forés	FW	Spain	25	2025
23	Salomón Rondón	FW	Venezuela	36	2025

=== Transfers In ===
Pos.	Player	Transferred from	Fee	Date	Source
MF	(Spain) Borja Sánchez	(Spain) Burgos	Loan return	30 June 2025	
MF	(Spain) Alberto del Moral	(Spain) Córdoba	Loan return	30 June 2025	
MF	(France) Brandon Domingues	(Hungary) Debrecen	Undisclosed	1 July 2025	
FW	(Venezuela) Salomón Rondón	(Mexico) Pachuca	Loan	3 July 2025	
MF	(Spain) Alberto Reina	(Spain) CD Mirandés	Free	6 July 2025	
MF	(Morocco) Ilyas Chaira	(Spain) Girona	€1,500,000	11 July 2025	
GK	(Romania) Horațiu Moldovan	(Spain) Atlético Madrid	Loan	18 July 2025	
MF	(Serbia) Luka Ilić	(Serbia) Red Star	€2,000,000	18 July 2025	
FW	(Spain) Álex Forés	(Spain) Villarreal CF	Loan	25 July 2025	
MF	(England) Ovie Ejaria	Unattached	Free	13 August 2025	
DF	(Ivory Coast) Eric Bailly	Unattached	Free	18 August 2025	
MF	(Belgium) Leander Dendoncker	(England) Aston Villa	Free	19 August 2025	
MF	(Croatia) Josip Brekalo	(Italy) Fiorentina	Free	21 August 2025	
DF	(Angola) David Carmo	(England) Nottingham Forest	Loan	29 August 2025	
DF	(Spain) Javi López	(Spain) Real Sociedad	Loan	31 August 2025	
FW	(Uruguay) Thiago Borbas	(Brazil) Red Bull Bragantino	Loan	2 January 2026	
MF	(Argentina) Thiago Fernández	(Spain) Villarreal	Loan	22 January 2026	
MF	(France) Brandon Domingues	(Poland) Górnik Zabrze	Loan return	28 April 2026	

=== Transfers Out ===
Pos.	Player	Transferred to	Fee	Date	Source
FW	(Brazil) Alemão	(Brazil) Internacional	Loan return	30 June 2025	
MF	(Spain) Jaime Seoane	(Mexico) Pachuca	Loan return	30 June 2025	
MF	(Spain) Francisco Portillo	(Spain) Huesca	End of contract	1 July 2025	
MF	(Spain) Sebas Moyano	(Spain) Zaragoza	End of contract	1 July 2025	
MF	(Spain) César de la Hoz		Contract terminated	12 July 2025	
MF	(Spain) Paulino de la Fuente	(Spain) Zaragoza	Contract terminated	29 July 2025	
DF	(Spain) Carlos Pomares	(Spain) Zaragoza	Contract terminated	29 July 2025	
MF	(Spain) Alberto del Moral	(Spain) Córdoba	Loan	1 August 2025	
FW	(Romania) Daniel Paraschiv	(Spain) Cultural Leonesa	Loan	1 August 2025	
MF	(Spain) Yayo	(Spain) Cultural Leonesa	Contract terminated	15 August 2025	
MF	(Spain) Álex Cardero	(Spain) CD Mirandés	Loan	20 August 2025	
MF	(Spain) Borja Sánchez	(Spain) Lugo	Contract terminated	29 August 2025	
MF	(France) Brandon Domingues	(Poland) Górnik Zabrze	Loan	30 December 2025	
MF	(Croatia) Josip Brekalo	(Germany) Hertha BSC	Free	2 February 2026	

=== Contract extensions ===
Player	Position	Date of extension	New contract until	Notes
Lucas Ahijado	Defender	10 July 2025	2026	
Santi Cazorla	Midfielder	13 July 2025	2026	
Álex Cardero	Midfielder	13 August 2025	2028	

== Exhibition matches ==
26 July 2025 Friendly	Getafe (Spain)	1–1	(Spain) Oviedo	Las Rozas de Madrid
20:00	Mayoral 76'		Ilić 44'	Stadium: Ciudad del Fútbol de Las Rozas

31 July 2025 GarraFest	Oviedo (Spain)	0–0 (3–5 p)	(Italy) Genoa	Oviedo
20:00				Stadium: Estadio Carlos Tartiere

31 July 2025 GarraFest	Oviedo (Spain)	0–0	(Spain) Villarreal	Oviedo
21:00				Stadium: Estadio Carlos Tartiere

3 August 2025 Friendly	Oviedo (Spain)	1–0	(Spain) Cultural Leonesa	Grado
19:00	Salomón Rondón 35'			Stadium: Estadio Marqués de La Vega de Anzo

6 August 2025 LXXIV Enma Cuervo	Oviedo (Spain)	1–2	(Spain) Deportivo La Coruña	Ribadeo
19:00	Viñas 48'		Eddahchouri 56'; Patino 62'	Stadium: Estadio Pepe Barrera

9 August 2025 Friendly	Leganés (Spain)	0–0	(Spain) Oviedo	Leganés
10:05				Stadium: instalación deportiva de Butarque

== Competitions ==
=== Overall record ===
Competition	First match	Last match	Starting round	Final position	Record							
Competition	First match	Last match	Starting round	Final position	Pld	W	D	L	GF	GA	GD	Win %
La Liga	15 August 2025	24 May 2026	Matchday 1		31	6	9	16	24	48	−24	19.35
Copa del Rey	28 October 2025		First round	First round	1	0	0	1	2	4	−2	0.00
Total					32	6	9	17	26	52	−26	18.75

Last updated: 12 April 2026
Source: Competitions

=== La Liga ===
==== League table ====
Pos	Team	Pld	W	D	L	GF	GA	GD	Pts	Qualification or relegation
16	Levante	38	11	9	18	47	61	−14	42 (Note: Head-to-head points: Levante 7, Osasuna 5, Mallorca 3.)	
17	Osasuna	38	11	9	18	44	50	−6	42	
18	Mallorca (R)	38	11	9	18	47	57	−10	42	Relegation to Segunda División
19	Girona (R)	38	9	14	15	39	55	−16	41	Relegation to Segunda División
20	Oviedo (R)	38	6	11	21	26	60	−34	29	Relegation to Segunda División

Source: LaLiga EA Sports
Rules for classification: 1) Points; 2) Head-to-head points; 3) Head-to-head goal difference; 4) Goal difference; 5) Goals scored; 6) Fair-play points
(Note: Head-to-head record is used only after all the matches between the teams in question have been played)
(R) Relegated

==== Results summary ====
Overall								Home						Away					
Pld	W	D	L	GF	GA	GD	Pts	W	D	L	GF	GA	GD	W	D	L	GF	GA	GD
31	6	9	16	24	48	−24	27	4	5	6	7	14	−7	2	4	10	17	34	−17

Last updated: 12 April 2026.

==== Results by round ====
Round	1	2	3	4	5	6	7	8	9	10	11	12	13	14	15	16	17	18	19	20	21	22	23	24	25	26	27	28	29	30	31	32	33	34
Ground	A	H	H	A	A	H	A	H	H	A	H	A	H	A	H	A	H	A	H	A	A	H	A	H	A	H	A	H	A					
Result	L	L	W	L	L	L	W	L	L	D	D	L	D	L	D	L	D	D	D	L	L	W	L	L	D	L	D	W	L					
Position	19	19	14	16	17	18	14	17	19	19	19	20	20	20	19	19	19	20	20	20	20	20	20	20	20	20	20	20	20	20	20	20	20	20

Updated to match(es) played on 1 April 2026. Source:
A = Away; H = Home; W = Win; D = Draw; L = Loss

==== Matches ====
15 August 2025 1	Villarreal	2–0	Oviedo	Villarreal
21:30 UTC+2	Luiz Júnior (yellow card) 13'; Eyong 29'; Gueye 36'		Rondón (penalty missed) 14'; Reina (yellow card) 18' (yellow-red card) 27'	Stadium: Estadio de la Cerámica; Attendance: 18,333; Referee: Alejandro Muñiz Ruiz

24 August 2025 2	Oviedo	0–3	Real Madrid	Oviedo
21:30 UTC+2	Ilić (yellow card) 66'; Calvo (yellow card) 72'	Report	Mbappé 37', 83'; Vinícius (yellow card) 80', (goal) 90+3'	Stadium: Estadio Carlos Tartiere; Attendance: 29,758; Referee: Ricardo de Burgos Bengoetxea

30 August 2025 3	Oviedo	1–0	Real Sociedad	Oviedo
19:00 UTC+2	Dendoncker 40'; Brekalo (yellow card) 84'; Hassan (yellow card) 90+3'		Ćaleta-Car (yellow card) 45+6'	Stadium: Estadio Carlos Tartiere; Attendance: 25,688; Referee: Adrián Cordero Vega

13 September 2025 4	Getafe	2–0	Oviedo	Getafe
14:00 UTC+2	Martín 45+4'; Mayoral 45+9'; Bekhoucha (yellow card) 89'; Neyou (yellow card) 90+5'	Report	Calvo (yellow card) 52'; Ahijado (yellow card) 59'; Viñas (yellow card) 79' (red card) 80'; Dendoncker (yellow card) 80'; Ilić (yellow card) 90+2'	Stadium: Estadio Coliseum; Attendance: 8,657; Referee: José Luis Guzmán

21 September 2025 5	Elche	1–0	Oviedo	Elche
18:30 UTC+2	Silva 9'; Bigas (yellow card) 37'; Affengruber (yellow card) 38'	Report	Dendoncker (yellow card) 59'; Rondón (yellow card) 66'	Stadium: Estadio Martínez Valero; Attendance: 27,235; Referee: Miguel Sesma Espinosa

25 September 2025 6	Oviedo	1–3	Barcelona	Oviedo
21:30 UTC+2		Report		Stadium: Estadio Carlos Tartiere

30 September 2025 7	Valencia	1–2	Oviedo	Valencia

4 October 2025 8	Oviedo	0–2	Levante	Oviedo

17 October 2025 9	Oviedo	0–2	Espanyol	Oviedo

25 October 2025 10	Girona	3–3	Oviedo	Girona

3 November 2025 11	Oviedo	0–0	Osasuna	Oviedo

9 November 2025 12	Athletic Bilbao	1–0	Oviedo	Bilbao

23 November 2025 13	Oviedo	0–0	Rayo Vallecano	Oviedo

29 November 2025 14	Atlético Madrid	2–0	Oviedo	Madrid

5 December 2025 15	Oviedo	0–0	Mallorca	Oviedo

14 December 2025 16	Sevilla	4–0	Oviedo	Seville

20 December 2025 17	Oviedo	0–0	Celta Vigo	Oviedo
	Colombatto (yellow card) 25'; Lucas (yellow card) 33'		Fernández (yellow card) 60'	Attendance: 23,613; Referee: Francisco José Hernández Maeso

4 January 2026 18	Alavés	1–1	Oviedo	Vitoria-Gasteiz
				Stadium: Mendizorrotza

10 January 2026 19	Oviedo	1–1	Real Betis	Oviedo
				Stadium: Estadio Carlos Tartiere

17 January 2026 20	Osasuna	3–2	Oviedo	Pamplona
				Stadium: Estadio El Sadar

25 January 2026 21	Barcelona	3–0	Oviedo	Barcelona
				Stadium: Camp Nou

31 January 2026 22	Oviedo	1–0	Girona	Oviedo
				Stadium: Estadio Carlos Tartiere

15 February 2026 24	Oviedo	1–2	Athletic Bilbao	Oviedo
				Stadium: Estadio Carlos Tartiere

21 February 2026 25	Real Sociedad	3–3	Oviedo	San Sebastián

28 February 2026 26	Oviedo	0–1	Atlético Madrid	Oviedo
				Stadium: Estadio Carlos Tartiere

4 March 2026 23	Rayo Vallecano	3–0	Oviedo	Madrid

9 March 2026 27	Espanyol	1–1	Oviedo	Cornellá de Llobregat

14 March 2026 28	Oviedo	1–0	Valencia	Oviedo
				Stadium: Estadio Carlos Tartiere

21 March 2026 29	Levante	4–2	Oviedo	Valencia
				Stadium: Ciutat de València

5 April 2026 30	Oviedo	1–0	Sevilla	Oviedo
				Stadium: Estadio Carlos Tartiere

12 April 2026 31	Celta Vigo	0–3	Oviedo	Vigo
				Stadium: Abanca-Balaídos

23 April 2026 33	Oviedo	1–1	Villarreal	Oviedo
21:30				Stadium: Estadio Carlos Tartiere

26 April 2026 32	Oviedo	1–2	Elche	Oviedo
16:15				Stadium: Estadio Carlos Tartiere; Referee: José María Sánchez Martínez

3 May 2026 34	Real Betis	3–0	Oviedo	Seville
				Stadium: La Cartuja

10 May 2026 35	Oviedo	0–0	Getafe	Oviedo
				Stadium: Estadio Carlos Tartiere

14 May 2026 36	Real Madrid	2–0	Oviedo	Madrid
				Stadium: Bernabéu

17 May 2026 37	Oviedo	0–1	Alavés	Oviedo
				Stadium: Estadio Carlos Tartiere

23 May 2026 38	Mallorca	3–0	Oviedo	Palma
				Stadium: Son Moix

=== Copa del Rey ===
28 October 2025 First round	Ourense	4–2 (a.e.t.)	Oviedo	Ourense
