= Blanfla =

- Village
- Location in Ivory Coast
- Coordinates: 6°51′N 5°46′W
- Country: Ivory Coast
- District: Sassandra-Marahoué
- Region: Marahoué
- Department: Bouaflé
- Sub-prefecture: Bouaflé
- Time zone: UTC+0 (GMT)

Blanfla is a village in central Ivory Coast. It is in the sub-prefecture of Bouaflé, Bouaflé Department, Marahoué Region, Sassandra-Marahoué District.

Blanfla was a commune until March 2012, when 1,126 communes nationwide were abolished.
