= Paoufla =

- Village
- Location in Ivory Coast
- Coordinates: 7°32′N 5°58′W
- Country: Ivory Coast
- District: Sassandra-Marahoué
- Region: Marahoué
- Department: Zuénoula
- Sub-prefecture: Zuénoula
- Time zone: UTC+0 (GMT)

Paoufla is a village in central Ivory Coast. It is in the sub-prefecture of Zuénoula, Zuénoula Department, Marahoué Region, Sassandra-Marahoué District.

Paoufla was a commune until March 2012, when it became one of 1,126 communes nationwide that were abolished.
