= Huafla =

- Village
- Location in Ivory Coast
- Coordinates: 6°33′52″N 5°48′02″W
- Country: Ivory Coast
- District: Sassandra-Marahoué
- Region: Marahoué
- Department: Sinfra
- Sub-prefecture: Sinfra
- Time zone: UTC+0 (GMT)

Huafla is a village in central Ivory Coast. It is in the sub-prefecture of Sinfra, Sinfra Department, Marahoué Region, Sassandra-Marahoué District.

Huafla was a commune until March 2012, when it became one of 1,126 communes nationwide that were abolished.
