= Gohitafla Department =

Coordinates: 6°49′N 5°58′W

Gohitafla Department Département de Gohitafla
- Department
- Location in Ivory Coast.
- Country: Ivory Coast
- District: Sassandra-Marahoué
- Region: Marahoué
- 2020: Established as a second-level subdivision
- 2021: Converted to a third-level subdivision
- Departmental seat: Gohitafla

Government
  - Prefect: Kouakou Yao

Area
  - Total: 778 km^{2} (300 sq mi)

Population (2021 census)
  - Total: 83,370
  - Density: 107/km^{2} (278/sq mi)
- Time zone: UTC+0 (GMT)

Gohitafla Department is a department of Marahoué Region in Sassandra-Marahoué District, Ivory Coast. In 2021, its population was 83,370 and its seat is the settlement of Gohitafla. The three sub-prefectures of the department are Gohitafla, Iriéfla, and Maminigui.

== History ==
Gohitafla Department was created in 2020 by dividing the Zuénoula Department, in the Marahoué Region. In 2021, districts were reinstated, and the Marahoué Region was included in the Sassandra-Marahoué District.
