= Alhassane =

Alhassane is both a given name and a surname. Notable people with the name include:

- Alhassane Baldé (born 1985), Guinean athlete
- Alhassane Dosso (born 1989), Ivorian footballer
- Alhassane Issoufou (born 1981), Nigerien footballer
- Alhassane Keita (born 1983), Guinean footballer
- Alhassane Keita (footballer, born 1992), Guinean footballer
- Alhassane Soumah (born 1996), Guinean footballer
- Alhassane Touré (born 1984), Malian footballer
- Rahim Alhassane (born 2002), Nigerian footballer
