= Zéménafla =

- Village
- Location in Ivory Coast
- Coordinates: 6°33′N 5°47′W
- Country: Ivory Coast
- District: Sassandra-Marahoué
- Region: Marahoué
- Department: Sinfra
- Sub-prefecture: Sinfra
- Time zone: UTC+0 (GMT)

Zéménafla is a village in central Ivory Coast. It is in the sub-prefecture of Sinfra, Sinfra Department, Marahoué Region, Sassandra-Marahoué District.

Zéménafla was a commune until March 2012, when it became one of 1,126 communes nationwide that were abolished.
