= Duonfla =

- Village
- Location in Ivory Coast
- Coordinates: 6°51′N 5°30′W
- Country: Ivory Coast
- District: Sassandra-Marahoué
- Region: Marahoué
- Department: Bouaflé
- Sub-prefecture: Bouaflé
- Time zone: UTC+0 (GMT)

Duonfla is a village in central Ivory Coast. It is in the sub-prefecture of Bouaflé, Bouaflé Department, Marahoué Region, Sassandra-Marahoué District.

Duonfla was a commune until March 2012, when it became one of 1,126 communes nationwide that were abolished.
