= Tofla =

Tofla Toafla
- Village
- Location in Ivory Coast
- Coordinates: 7°39′N 5°51′W
- Country: Ivory Coast
- District: Sassandra-Marahoué
- Region: Marahoué
- Department: Zuénoula
- Sub-prefecture: Iriéfla
- Time zone: UTC+0 (GMT)

Tofla (also spelled Toafla) is an Ivory Coast village in the central sub-prefecture of Iriéfla, Zuénoula Department, Marahoué Region, Sassandra-Marahoué District.

It was a commune until March 2012, when it and 1,125 others nationwide were abolished.
