= Zougounéfla =

- Village
- Location in Ivory Coast
- Coordinates: 7°43′N 5°56′W
- Country: Ivory Coast
- District: Sassandra-Marahoué
- Region: Marahoué
- Department: Zuénoula
- Sub-prefecture: Vouéboufla
- Time zone: UTC+0 (GMT)

Zougounéfla is a village in central Ivory Coast. It is in the sub-prefecture of Vouéboufla, Zuénoula Department, Marahoué Region, Sassandra-Marahoué District.

Zougounéfla was a commune until March 2012, when it became one of 1,126 communes nationwide that were abolished.

The population of Zougounéfla is mainly composed of the Guro tribe, who speak the Guro language. The village contains a hospital, an elementary school, a mosque and a mission Protestant church. The Zamble, Zaouli, and Dje rituals are practiced in the village.
