= Pakouabo =

- Town and sub-prefecture
- Location in Ivory Coast
- Coordinates: 7°9′N 5°48′W
- Country: Ivory Coast
- District: Sassandra-Marahoué
- Region: Marahoué
- Department: Bouaflé

Population (2014)
  - Total: 18,977
- Time zone: UTC+0 (GMT)

Pakouabo is a town in central Ivory Coast. It is a sub-prefecture of Bouaflé Department in Marahoué Region, Sassandra-Marahoué District.

Pakouabo was a commune until March 2012, when it became one of 1,126 communes nationwide that were abolished.

In 2014, the population of the sub-prefecture of Pakouabo was 18,977.

== Villages ==
The five villages of the sub-prefecture of Pakouabo and their population in 2014 are:

1. Aka - Nguessankro (2,934)
2. Diacohou-Nord (2,542)
3. Krigambo (1,194)
4. Pakouabo (5,742)
5. Pangba-Kouamékro (6,565)
