= Glossina pallicera =

Scientific classification
- Kingdom: Animalia
- Phylum: Arthropoda
- Clade: Pancrustacea
- Class: Insecta
- Order: Diptera
- Family: Glossinidae
- Genus: Glossina
- Species: G. pallicera

Binomial name
- Glossina pallicera Bigot, 1891
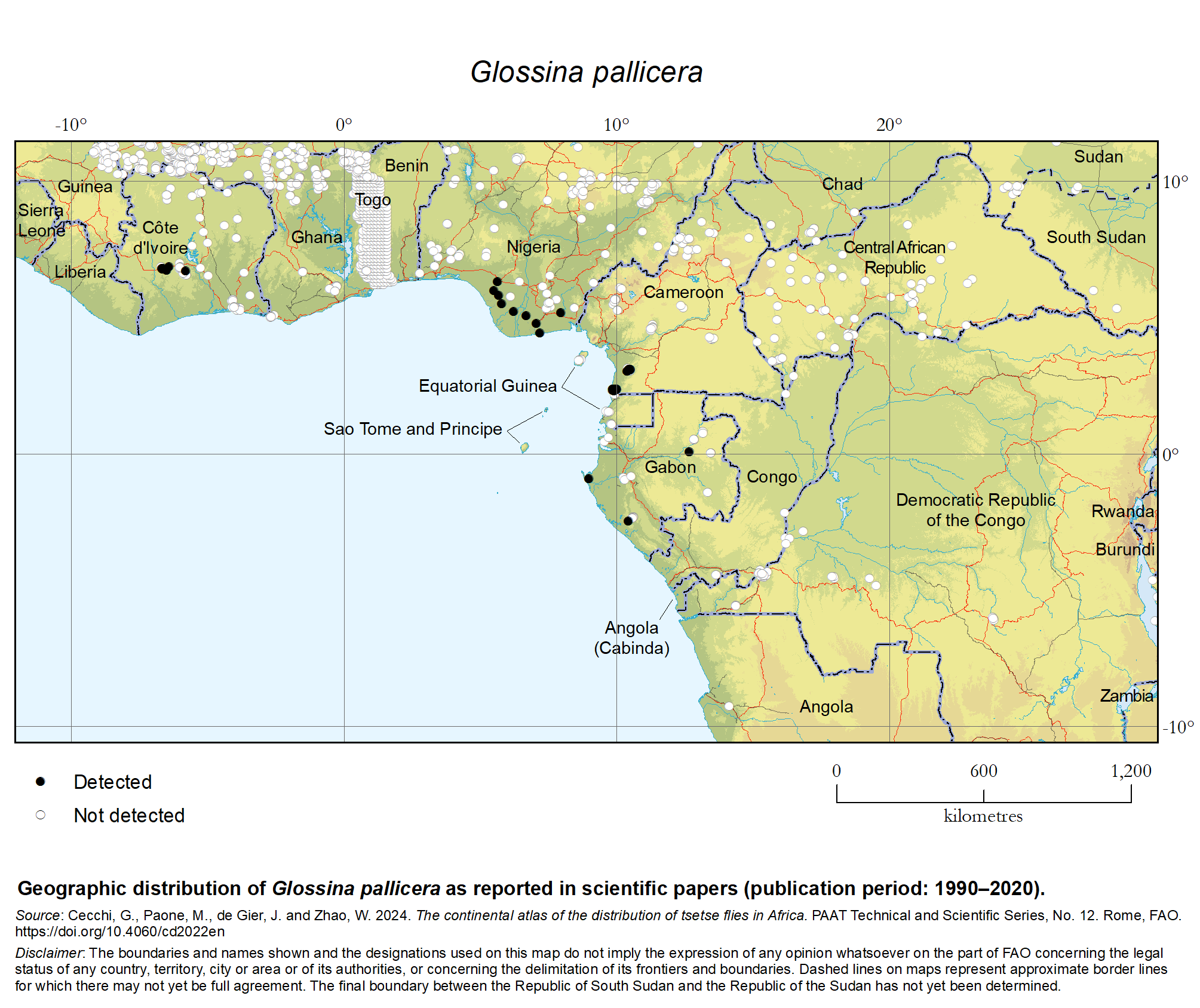
- Geographic distribution of Glossina pallicera as reported in scientific papers – Publication period 1990–2020

Species of tsetse fly

Glossina pallicera is one of the 23 recognized species of tsetse flies (genus Glossina), it belongs to the riverine/palpalis group (subgenus Nemorhina).

== Taxonomy ==
Two subspecies of G. pallicera are recognized:

- Glossina pallicera pallicera Bigot, 1891
- Glossina pallicera newsteadi Austen, 1929

== Distribution ==
Glossina pallicera was known to be present in twelve countries in western Africa and central Africa; Côte d'Ivoire, Ghana, Guinea, Liberia, Nigeria and Sierra Leone in western Africa and Angola, Cameroon, the Central African Republic, the Congo, the Democratic Republic of the Congo and Gabon in central Africa. However, in the peer-reviewed scientific literature for the period 1990–2020, data on its occurrence was only available for four countries (i.e. Cameroon, Côte d'Ivoire, Gabon and Nigeria). The two subspecies are believed to be geographically separated.

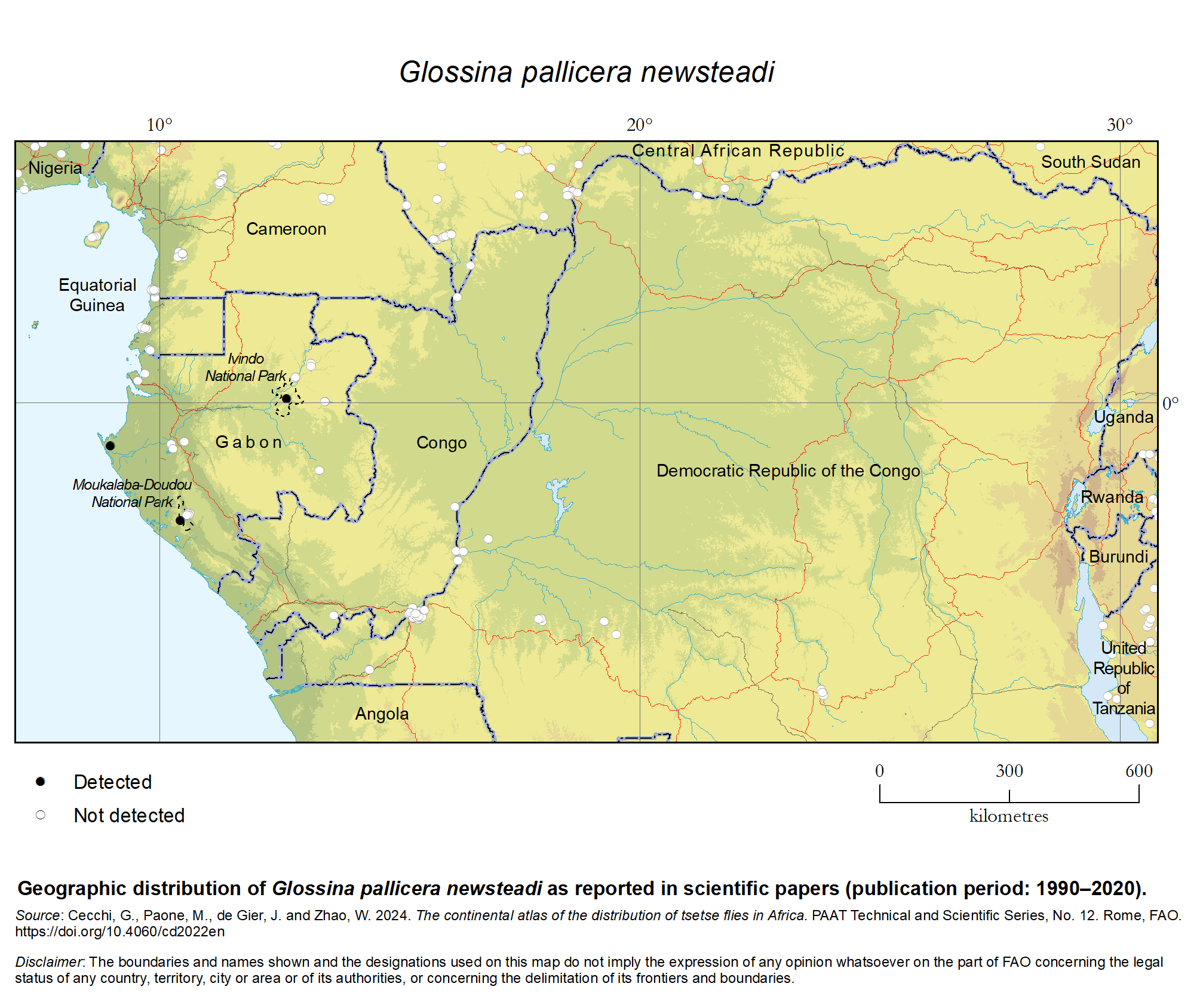
Geographic distribution of Glossina pallicera newsteadi as reported in scientific papers –Publication period 1990–2020

=== Glossina pallicera newsteadi ===
Glossina pallicera newsteadi occupies the eastern part of the distribution of Glossina pallicera, from eastern Cameroon and Gabon to Angola and the Democratic Republic of the Congo. In the peer-reviewed scientific literature for the period 1990–2020, G. pallicera newsteadi was only reported from Gabon, and in particular from the Ivindo National Park and the Moukalaba-Doudou National Park, and from the Atlantic coast in the Canton Océan. Very limited entomological surveys were carried out in the other areas and countries where the subspecies was known to occur.

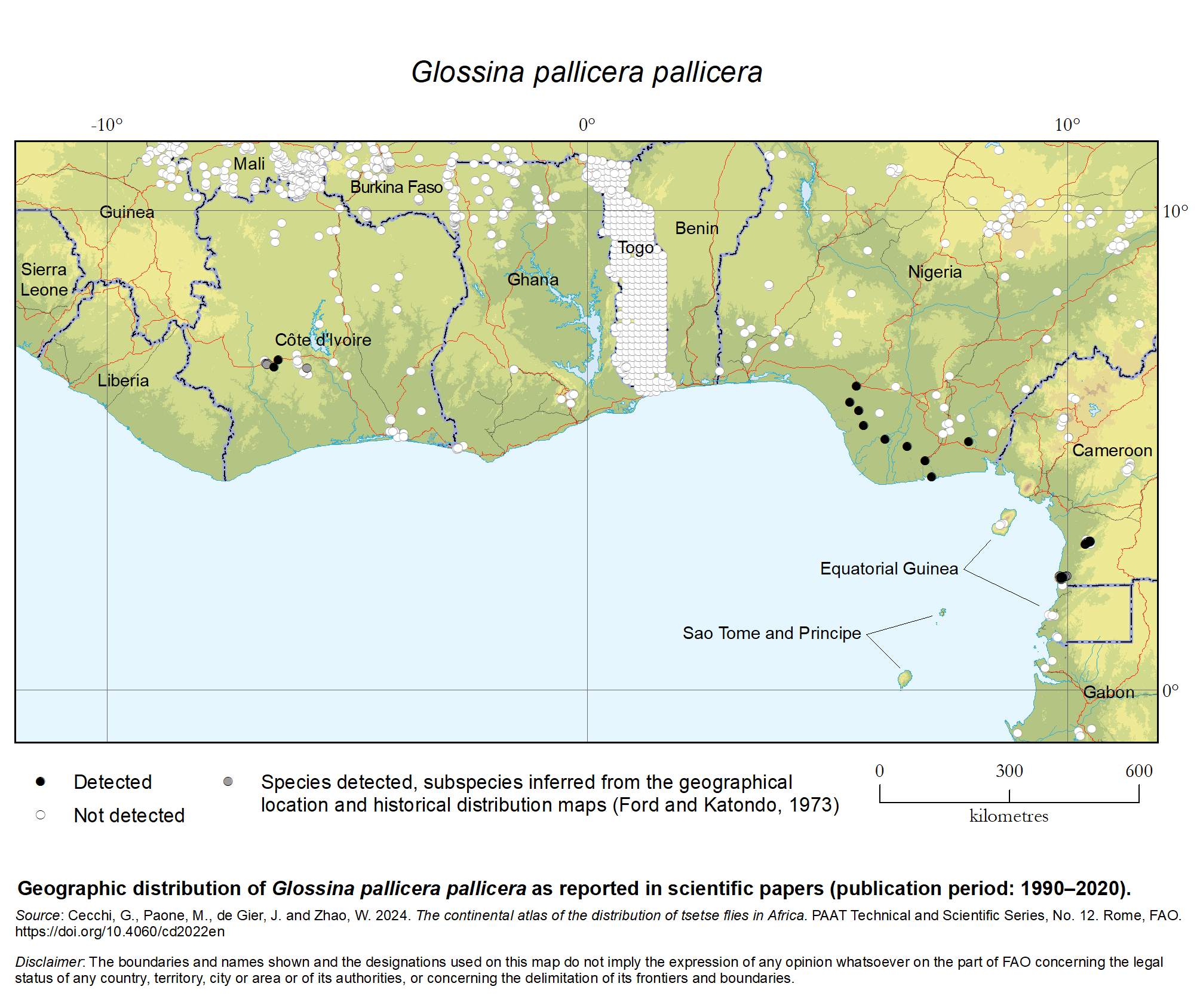
Geographic distribution of Glossina pallicera pallicera as reported in scientific papers –Publication period 1990–2020

=== Glossina pallicera pallicera ===
Glossina pallicera pallicera occupies the western part of the distribution of Glossina pallicera, from Sierra Leone to western Cameroon. In the peer-reviewed scientific literature for the period 1990–2020, G. pallicera pallicera was reported from Côte d'Ivoire (areas of Daloa, and Sinfra), and more extensively in 2026, in Cameroon (sleeping sickness endemic areas of Campo and Bipindi) and in Nigeria (Niger Delta Region). No published record of occurrence is available for 1990–2020 from Ghana, Guinea, Liberia or Sierra Leone.
