= Zanzra =

- Town and sub-prefecture
- Location in Ivory Coast
- Coordinates: 7°29′N 6°13′W
- Country: Ivory Coast
- District: Sassandra-Marahoué
- Region: Marahoué
- Department: Zuénoula

Population (2014)
  - Total: 18,545
- Time zone: UTC+0 (GMT)

Zanzra is a town in central Ivory Coast. It is a sub-prefecture of Zuénoula Department in Marahoué Region, Sassandra-Marahoué District.

Zanzra was a commune until March 2012, when it became one of 1,126 communes nationwide that were abolished.

In 2014, the population of the sub-prefecture of Zanzra was 18,545.

== Villages ==
The 19 villages of the sub-prefecture of Zanzra and their population in 2014 are:

1. Balogui (258)
2. Banoufla 1 (2,301)
3. Béziaka (1,249)
4. Bouata (738)
5. Complexe Sucrier (7,997)
6. Douénéfla (729)
7. Duenzra (1,743)
8. Gouénéfla (115)
9. Gouétifla (325)
10. Kouezra (1,890)
11. Kouyafla (447)
12. Ourouzra (374)
13. Pouezra (824)
14. Séizra 1 (554)
15. Séizra 2 (653)
16. Thera (529)
17. Tranhounfla (677)
18. Uénéfla (882)
19. Zanzra (2,762)
