= Tibéita =

- Town and sub-prefecture
- Location in Ivory Coast
- Coordinates: 7°11′N 5°49′W
- Country: Ivory Coast
- District: Sassandra-Marahoué
- Region: Marahoué
- Department: Bouaflé

Population (2014)
  - Total: 18,977
- Time zone: UTC+0 (GMT)

Tibéita is a town in central Ivory Coast. It is a sub-prefecture of Bouaflé Department in Marahoué Region, Sassandra-Marahoué District.

Tibéita was a commune until March 2012, when it became one of 1,126 communes nationwide that were abolished.

In 2014, the population of the sub-prefecture of Tibéita was 15,664.

== Villages ==
The eight villages of the sub-prefecture of Tibéita and their population in 2014 are:

1. Baziafla (791)
2. Bohitiéfla (232)
3. Bouafla (4,436)
4. Danagoro (3,277)
5. Dianfla (1,090)
6. Tibéita (1,899)
7. Zanhouofla (563)
8. Zoola (3,376)
