= Bazré =

- Town and sub-prefecture
- Location in Ivory Coast
- Coordinates: 6°44′N 5°29′W
- Country: Ivory Coast
- District: Sassandra-Marahoué
- Region: Marahoué
- Department: Sinfra

Population (2014)
  - Total: 34,781
- Time zone: UTC+0 (GMT)

Bazré is a town in south-central Ivory Coast. It is a sub-prefecture of Sinfra Department in Marahoué Region, Sassandra-Marahoué District. The town is seven kilometres west of the border of Yamoussoukro Autonomous District and 12 kilometres northwest of the Gôh-Djiboua–Sassandra-Marahoué–Yamoussoukro tripoint.

Bazré was a commune until March 2012, when it became one of 1,126 communes nationwide that were abolished.

In 2014, the population of the sub-prefecture of Bazré was 34,781.

== Villages ==
The 17 villages of the sub-prefecture of Bazré and their population in 2014 are:

1. Bazré (11,392)
2. Bendéfla (1,275)
3. Bounafla (4,129)
4. Dialodougou (2,037)
5. Gohouo (2,471)
6. Koffikro (729)
7. Konanbokro (1,013)
8. Kouamékro (557)
9. Laminedougou (1,288)
10. Meh-Tanokro (1,629)
11. Moussadougou (646)
12. Naloi-Kouassikro (1,373)
13. Odiénnékanman (1,574)
14. Petit-Bouaké (1,019)
15. Petit-Katiola (322)
16. Tiékorodougou (2,067)
17. Zéduékro (1,260)
