= Alemão (footballer, born 1998) =

Brazilian footballer (born 1998)

Personal information
- Full name: Alexandre Zurawski
- Date of birth: 1 April 1998 (age 28)
- Place of birth: Campo Erê, Brazil
- Height: 1.82 m (6 ft 0 in)
- Position: Forward

Team information
- Current team: Rayo Vallecano
- Number: 9

Youth career
- Tupi-SC
- 2015–2017: Metropolitano

Senior career*
Years	Team	Apps	(Gls)
2017–2019	Metropolitano	5	(1)
2018	→ Kyoto Sanga (loan)	0	(0)
2019	→ Criciúma (loan)	1	(0)
2019	→ Fluminense-SC (loan)	16	(4)
2020–2022	Avaí	3	(0)
2021	→ Juventus Jaraguá (loan)	2	(2)
2022	→ Novo Hamburgo (loan)	7	(2)
2022–2025	Internacional	54	(11)
2023–2025	→ Oviedo (loan)	73	(19)
2025	Pachuca	3	(0)
2025–	Rayo Vallecano	33	(4)
- * Club domestic league appearances and goals as of 24 October 2026

Alexandre Zurawski (born 1 April 1998), known as Alemão, is a Brazilian professional footballer who plays as a forward for La Liga club Rayo Vallecano.

His nickname means "German" in Portuguese.

== Career ==
Born in Campo Erê, Santa Catarina, Alemão began his career with local side Tupi-SC before joining the youth sides of Metropolitano at the age of 17. After making his first team debut in the 2017 Campeonato Catarinense, he was loaned to J2 League side Kyoto Sanga on 25 December of that year, but left on 19 July 2018 after making no appearances for the side.

Back to Metrô for the 2018 Copa Santa Catarina, Alemão moved to Criciúma on 27 December of that year. After just one appearance, he subsequently joined Fluminense-SC, where he featured regularly.

On 11 December 2019, Alemão was announced at Avaí for the upcoming season, initially as a member of the under-23 team. In February 2021, after failing to make a breakthrough, he was loaned to Juventus Jaraguá.

After overcoming a serious injury, Alemão would feature sparingly for Avaí during the remainder of the 2021 campaign, before moving on loan to Novo Hamburgo on 10 January 2022. On 29 March, he signed a contract with Internacional until December 2023.

On 11 October 2022, after establishing himself as a starter at Inter, Alemão renewed his link with the club until 2025. He ended the season as the club's top scorer with 10 goals, but lost space after the arrival of Enner Valencia.

In July 2023, Alemão was sold to Grupo Pachuca for a rumoured fee of US$ 3.2 million, being announced at Spanish side Real Oviedo of the Segunda División (a club owned by the group) shortly after, albeit on loan from Internacional. His loan was extended for a further year in June 2024, and he finished the 2024–25 season as the club's top scorer with 14 goals as the Carbayones achieved promotion to La Liga. On 21 July 2025, Pachuca announced the arrival of Alemão on a permanent deal.

On 1 September 2025, he returned to Spain after signing a five-year deal with Rayo Vallecano in the top tier. He scored his first La Liga goal in the stoppage time of a 1–0 victory over Alavés on 26 October. On 12 March 2026, he scored his first goals in European competitions, netting a brace in a 3–1 away win over Samsunspor in the Conference League round of 16. Later that year, he scored in both legs of the Conference League semi-final against Strasbourg, helping his club secure a place in the final with a 2–0 aggregate victory.

== Personal life ==
Born in Brazil, Alemão is of Polish descent. His paternal family comes from Poland and settled in Brazil before World War II. He is married to Maite, whom he married in 2025, and with whom he has a son named Artur.

== Career statistics ==
As of 24 October 2026

Appearances and goals by club, season and competition
Club	Season	League			State league (Note: Includes Campeonato Catarinense, Campeonato Catarinense Série B, Campeonato Gaúcho)		National cup (Note: Includes Copa do Brasil, Copa del Rey)		Continental		Other		Total	
Club	Season	Division	Apps	Goals	Apps	Goals	Apps	Goals	Apps	Goals	Apps	Goals	Apps	Goals
Metropolitano	2017	Série D	—		5	1	—		—		—		5	1
Metropolitano	2016	Catarinense Série B	—		—		—		—		9 (Note: Appearance(s) in Copa Santa Catarina)	1	9	1
Metropolitano	Total		—		5	1	—		—		9	1	14	2
Kyoto Sanga (loan)	2018	J2 League	0	0	—		0	0	—		—		0	0
Criciúma (loan)	2019	Série B	0	0	1	0	0	0	—		—		1	0
Fluminense do Itaum (loan)	2019	Catarinense Série B	—		16	4	—		—		14	3	30	7
Avaí	2020	Série B	0	0	3	0	1	0	—		1 (Note: Appearance(s) in Recopa Catarinense)	0	5	0
Avaí	2021	Catarinense Série B	0	0	—		—		—		7	3	7	3
Avaí	Total		0	0	3	0	1	0	—		8	3	12	3
Juventus Jaraguá (loan)	2021	Série D	0	0	2	2	—		—		—		2	2
Novo Hamburgo	2022	Gaúcho	—		7	2	—		—		—		7	2
Internacional	2022	Série A	34	8	—		—		8 (Note: Appearance(s) in Copa Sudamericana)	2	—		42	10
Internacional	2023	Série A	9	1	11	2	4	0	5 (Note: Appearance(s) in Copa Libertadores)	1	—		29	4
Internacional	Total		43	9	11	2	4	0	13	3	—		71	14
Oviedo	2023–24	Segunda División	33	5	—		2	1	—		4 (Note: Appearance(s) in Segunda División play-offs)	2	39	8
Oviedo	2024–25	Segunda División	40	14	—		1	0	—		4	0	45	14
Oviedo	Total		73	19	—		3	1	—		8	2	84	22
Pachuca	2025–26	Liga MX	3	0	—		0	0	—		3 (Note: Appearance(s) in Leagues Cup)	1	6	1
Rayo Vallecano	2025–26	La Liga	26	4	—		1	0	10 (Note: Appearances in UEFA Conference League)	4	—		37	8
Rayo Vallecano	2026–27	La Liga	7	0	—		0	0	—		—		7	0
Rayo Vallecano	Total		33	4	—		1	0	10	4	—		44	8
Career total			152	32	45	11	9	1	23	7	42	10	271	61

== Honours ==
Rayo Vallecano

- UEFA Conference League runner-up: 2025–26
