= Colombatto =

Colombatto is a surname. Notable people with the surname include:

- Enrica Bianchi Colombatto (born 1942), Italian actress
- Santiago Colombatto (born 1997), Argentine footballer
