= Kononfla =

Kononfla Konéfla
- Town and sub-prefecture
- Location in Ivory Coast
- Coordinates: 6°39′N 5°36′W
- Country: Ivory Coast
- District: Sassandra-Marahoué
- Region: Marahoué
- Department: Sinfra

Area
  - Total: 503 km^{2} (194 sq mi)

Population (2021 census)
  - Total: 55,427
  - Density: 110/km^{2} (285/sq mi)
  - Town: 23,310
- (2014 census)
- Time zone: UTC+0 (GMT)

Kononfla (also spelled Konéfla) is a town in central Ivory Coast. It is a sub-prefecture of Sinfra Department in Marahoué Region, Sassandra-Marahoué District.

Kononfla was a commune until March 2012, when it became one of 1,126 communes nationwide that were abolished.

In 2021, the population of the sub-prefecture of Kononfla was 55,427.

== Villages ==
The 13 villages of the sub-prefecture of Kononfla and their population in 2014 are:

1. Adk-Kouadiokro (2,427)
2. Dienembroufla (4,688)
3. Gnamienkro (814)
4. Karamogosso (1,072)
5. Kayeta (3,121)
6. Kononfla (23,310)
7. Kouadiokro (540)
8. Kouassi-Kouadiokro (938)
9. Koumoudji (4,454)
10. Krakro (873)
11. Manoufla-N (6,031)
12. Niamienkonankro (1,516)
13. N'zikro (992)
