= Bonon Department =

Coordinates: 6°49′N 5°58′W

Bonon Department Département de Bonon
- Department
- Location in Ivory Coast.
- Country: Ivory Coast
- District: Sassandra-Marahoué
- Region: Marahoué
- 2020: Established as a second-level subdivision
- 2021: Converted to a third-level subdivision
- Departmental seat: Bonon

Government
  - Prefect: Yapi Ogou Claude

Area
  - Total: 1,428 km^{2} (551 sq mi)

Population (2021 census)
  - Total: 167,397
  - Density: 117.2/km^{2} (303.6/sq mi)
- Time zone: UTC+0 (GMT)

Bonon Department is a department of Marahoué Region in Sassandra-Marahoué District, Ivory Coast. In 2021, its population was 167,397 and its seat is the settlement of Bonon. The sub-prefectures of the department are Bonon, and Zaguiéta.

== History ==
Bonon Department was created in 2020 by dividing the Bouaflé Department, in the Marahoué Region. In 2021, districts were reinstated, and the Marahoué region was included in the Sassandra-Marahoué District.
