= Kouétinfla =

Kouétinfla Manoufra
- Town and sub-prefecture
- Location in Ivory Coast
- Coordinates: 6°37′N 6°3′W
- Country: Ivory Coast
- District: Sassandra-Marahoué
- Region: Marahoué
- Department: Sinfra

Population (2014)
  - Total: 22,181
- Time zone: UTC+0 (GMT)

Kouétinfla (also known as Manoufra) is a town in south-central Ivory Coast. It is a sub-prefecture of Sinfra Department in Marahoué Region, Sassandra-Marahoué District.

Kouétinfla was a commune until March 2012, when it became one of 1,126 communes nationwide that were abolished.

In 2014, the population of the sub-prefecture of Kouétinfla was 22,181.

== Villages ==
The 16 villages of the sub-prefecture of Kouétinfla and their population in 2014 are:

1. Akakro (1,126)
2. Dogokro (382)
3. Dramanékro (1,304)
4. Gbrizokro (1,437)
5. Gonazofla (1,396)
6. Katiénou (1,026)
7. Konankouamékro (746)
8. Kouadiobakro (772)
9. Kouassikro (480)
10. Kouetinfla (8,387)
11. Kouroudoufla (950)
12. Niamienkro (289)
13. N'zuekro (457)
14. Okakro (665)
15. Yanantinfla (1,773)
16. Yaokro (991)
