= Bégbessou =

- Town and sub-prefecture
- Location in Ivory Coast
- Coordinates: 7°4′N 5°36′W
- Country: Ivory Coast
- District: Sassandra-Marahoué
- Region: Marahoué
- Department: Bouaflé

Population (2014)
  - Total: 19,787
- Time zone: UTC+0 (GMT)

Bégbessou is a town in central Ivory Coast. It is a sub-prefecture of Bouaflé Department in Marahoué Region, Sassandra-Marahoué District. The town is approximately five kilometres away from Lake Kossou.

Bégbessou was a commune until March 2012, when it became one of 1,126 communes nationwide that were abolished.

In 2014, the population of the sub-prefecture of Bégbessou was 19,787.

== Villages ==
The 11 villages of the sub-prefecture of Bégbessou and their population in 2014 are:

1. Akakro (1,012)
2. Allahou-Bazi (3,678)
3. Angovia (4,382)
4. Bégbessou (4,986)
5. Diallé (924)
6. Kami (759)
7. Kouakou Gnanou (1,832)
8. Koubi (400)
9. N'dakoffi-Yobouékro (534)
10. N'dènou (611)
11. Saimimbo (669)
