= Zaguiéta =

- Town and sub-prefecture of Ivory Coast
- Location in Ivory Coast
- Coordinates: 6°47′N 6°4′W
- Country: Ivory Coast
- District: Sassandra-Marahoué
- Region: Marahoué
- Department: Bouaflé

Population (2014)
  - Total: 46,266
- Time zone: UTC+0 (GMT)

Zaguiéta is a town in west-central Ivory Coast. It is a sub-prefecture in Marahoué Region, Sassandra-Marahoué District.

Zaguiéta was a commune until March 2012, when it became one of 1,126 communes nationwide that were abolished.

In 2014, the population of the sub-prefecture of Zaguiéta was 46,266.

== Villages ==
The 17 villages of the sub-prefecture of Zaguiéta and their population in 2014 are:

1. Bantifla (1,614)
2. Bantinfla (1,094)
3. Biegon (2,254)
4. Blanoufla (3,024)
5. Bounantinfla (3,141)
6. Bounifla (4,038)
7. Dianoufla (5,378)
8. Ganoufla (1,996)
9. Gofla (767)
10. Iribafla (1,712)
11. Kangreta (1,268)
12. Laofla (2,315)
13. Sayeta (1,337)
14. Vrigrita (2,734)
15. Zaguiéta (9,790)
16. Zanoufla (2,902)
17. Zegata-Gouro (902)
