= N'Douffoukankro =

- Town and sub-prefecture
- Location in Ivory Coast
- Coordinates: 6°52′N 5°49′W
- Country: Ivory Coast
- District: Sassandra-Marahoué
- Region: Marahoué
- Department: Bouaflé

Population (2014)
  - Total: 29,097
- Time zone: UTC+0 (GMT)

N'Douffoukankro is a town in central Ivory Coast. It is a sub-prefecture of Bouaflé Department in Marahoué Region, Sassandra-Marahoué District.

N'Douffoukankro was a commune until March 2012, when it became one of 1,126 communes nationwide that were abolished.

In 2014, the population of the sub-prefecture of N'Douffoukankro was 29,097.

== Villages ==
The eight villages of the sub-prefecture of N'Douffoukankro and their population in 2014 are:

1. Akowébo (2,103)
2. Attossè (3,627)
3. Benou (1,784)
4. Blé (3,727)
5. Diacohou-Sud (5,323)
6. Nangrekro (3,453)
7. N'dénoukro (2,889)
8. N'douffoukankro (6,191)
