= 2024–25 Real Oviedo season =

Real Oviedo
2024–25 season
- Head coach: Javier Calleja (until 25 March)
- Stadium: Estadio Carlos Tartiere
- Segunda División: 3rd (promoted through the play-offs)
- Copa del Rey: First round
- Top goalscorer: League: Alemão (13); All: Alemão (13)
- Highest home attendance: 28,123
- Lowest home attendance: 16,275
- Average home league attendance: 20,673
- Biggest win: RFE 1-5 OVI
- Biggest defeat: ELC 4-0 OVI
Home colours	Away colours	Third colours

The 2024–25 season is the 99th season in the history of the Real Oviedo, and the club's 10th consecutive season in Segunda División. In addition to the domestic league, the team is scheduled to participate in the Copa del Rey.

== Transfers ==
=== In ===
Pos.	Player	Transferred from	Fee	Date	Source
MF	(Ghana) Kwasi Sibo	(Spain) Amorebieta	Free	4 July 2024	
MF	(Spain) Carlos Dotor	(Spain) Celta Vigo	Loan	21 July 2024	
FW	(France) Haissem Hassan	(Spain) Villarreal B	€1,500,000	11 August 2024	
MF	(Morocco) Ilyas Chaira	(Spain) Girona	Loan	24 August 2024	
FW	(Uruguay) Federico Viñas	(Mexico) Club León	Loan	28 August 2024	
MF	(Spain) Francisco Portillo	Unattached	Free	12 November 2024	
MF	(Spain) César de la Hoz	(Spain) Real Valladolid	Free	16 January 2025	
DF	(Spain) Nacho Vidal	(Spain) Osasuna	Undisclosed	22 January 2025	

=== Out ===
Pos.	Player	Transferred from	Fee	Date	Source
FW	(Portugal) Masca	(Spain) Eldense	Free	2 January 2025	
MF	(Spain) Alberto del Moral	(Spain) Córdoba	Loan	15 January 2025	
MF	(Spain) Carlos Dotor	(Spain) Celta Vigo	End of loan	24 January 2025	

== Friendlies ==
=== Pre-season ===
24 July 2024 Friendly	Getafe	0–1	Oviedo

31 July 2024 Friendly	Oviedo	3–2	Al-Ettifaq

3 August 2024 Friendly	Oviedo	0–2	Racing de Santander

9 August 2024 Friendly	Leganés	2–1	Oviedo

10 August 2024 Friendly	Oviedo	2–4	Unionistas

== Competitions ==
=== Overall record ===
Competition	First match	Last match	Starting round	Record							
Competition	First match	Last match	Starting round	Pld	W	D	L	GF	GA	GD	Win %
Segunda División	17 August 2024	1 June 2025	Matchday 1	29	14	8	7	41	34	+7	48.28
Copa del Rey	31 October 2024	31 October 2024	Round 1	1	0	1	0	0	0	+0	0.00
Total				30	14	9	7	41	34	+7	46.67

Last updated: 29 September 2024
Source: Soccerway

=== Segunda División ===
==== League table ====
Pos	Team	Pld	W	D	L	GF	GA	GD	Pts	Qualification or relegation
1	Levante (C, P)	42	22	13	7	69	42	+27	79	Promotion to La Liga
2	Elche (P)	42	22	11	9	59	34	+25	77	Promotion to La Liga
3	Oviedo (O, P)	42	21	12	9	56	42	+14	75 (Note: Oviedo finished ahead of Mirandés on head-to-head goal difference: Oviedo 4–1 Mirandés, Mirandés 1–0 Oviedo.)	Qualification for promotion playoffs
4	Mirandés	42	22	9	11	59	40	+19	75	Qualification for promotion playoffs
5	Racing Santander	42	20	11	11	65	51	+14	71	Qualification for promotion playoffs

Source: LaLiga Hypermotion
Rules for classification: 1) Points; 2) Head-to-head points; 3) Head-to-head goal difference; 4) Goal difference; 5) Goals scored; 6) Fair-play points
(Note: Head-to-head record is used only after all the matches between the teams in question have been played)
(C) Champions; (O) Play-off winners; (P) Promoted

==== Results summary ====
Overall								Home						Away					
Pld	W	D	L	GF	GA	GD	Pts	W	D	L	GF	GA	GD	W	D	L	GF	GA	GD
29	14	8	7	41	34	+7	50	9	2	4	24	17	+7	5	6	3	17	17	0

Source: LaLiga Hypermotion

==== Results by round ====
Round	1	2	3	4	5	6	7	8	9	10	11	12	13	14	15	16	17	18	19	20	21	22	23	24	25	26	27	28	29	30	31
Ground	A	A	H	A	H	A	H	A	H	A	H	A	H	A	H	A	H	A	H	A	H	H	A	H	A	H	H	A	H	A	H
Result	W	D	L	L	W	D	W	D	W	D	W	L	W	D	W	L	L	W	W	W	L	D	W	W	D	D	W	W	L	L	D
Position	6	10	13	17	11	12	9	10	8	7	4	8	5	5	3	7	8	8	5	4	6	7	6	5	6	5	5	2	6	6	6

Updated to match(es) played on 14 March 2025. Source: LaLiga Hypermotion
A = Away; H = Home; W = Win; D = Draw; L = Loss

==== Matches ====
The match schedule was released on 26 June 2024.

17 August 2024 1	Deportivo La Coruña	0–1	Oviedo	A Coruña
19:00		Report	del Moral 5'	Stadium: Riazor; Attendance: 26,715; Referee: Salvador Lax Franco

25 August 2024 2	Castellón	0–0	Oviedo	Castellón de la Plana
21:30		Report		Stadium: Estadio SkyFi Castalia; Attendance: 13,709; Referee: Jon Ander González Esteban

30 August 2024 3	Oviedo	1–3	Racing Santander	Oviedo
21:30	Ilyas 12'	Report	Martín 26', 27'	Stadium: Estadio Carlos Tartiere; Attendance: 21,514; Referee: Eder Mallo Fernández

7 September 2024 4	Sporting Gijón	3–1	Oviedo	Gijón
18:30	Otero 20' (pen.); Cote 38'; Camp 76'		Ilyas 49'	Stadium: El Molinón; Attendance: 25,706; Referee: Manuel Jesús Orellana Cid

15 September 2024 5	Oviedo	1–0	Cartagena	Oviedo
16:15	Colombatto 82'	Report		Stadium: Estadio Carlos Tartiere; Attendance: 19,492; Referee: Rubén Ávalos Barrera

21 September 2024 6	Eldense	1–1	Oviedo	Elda
18:30	Đumić 44'	Report	Alemão 40'	Stadium: Nuevo Pepico Amat; Attendance: 3,897; Referee: José Antonio Sánchez Villalobos

29 September 2024 7	Oviedo	1–0	Eibar	Oviedo
18:30	Alemão 47'	Report		Stadium: Estadio Carlos Tartiere; Attendance: 19,281; Referee: Rafael Sánchez López

6 October 2024 8	Levante	0-0	Oviedo	Valencia
18:30		Report		Stadium: Estadio Ciutat de València; Attendance: 15,406; Referee: Dámaso Arcediano Monescillo

13 October 2024 9	Oviedo	3–2	Almería	Oviedo
16:15	Costas 12'; Seoane 18'; Alemão 70'	Report	Suárez 24', 67'	Stadium: Estadio Carlos Tartiere; Attendance: 19,426; Referee: Marta Huerta de Aza

19 October 2024 10	Málaga	0-0	Oviedo	Málaga
16:15		Report		Stadium: La Rosaleda; Attendance: 26,074; Referee: Miguel Sesma Espinosa

22 October 2024 11	Oviedo	4-1	Mirandés	Oviedo
19:00	Alemão 41'; Hassan 48'; Cardero 73'; Paraschiv 82'	Report	Tomeo 86'	Stadium: Estadio Carlos Tartiere; Attendance: 16,275; Referee: Álvaro Moreno Aragón

26 October 2024 12	Cádiz	2-0	Oviedo	Cádiz
16:15	Iza 45'; Ramos 86'	Report		Stadium: Estadio Nuevo Mirandilla; Attendance: 13,899; Referee: Iosu Galech Apezteguía

3 November 2024 13	Oviedo	3-1	Burgos	Oviedo
14:00	Luengo 42'; Paraschiv 72'; Ilyas 82'	Report	Niño 26'	Stadium: Estadio Carlos Tartiere; Attendance: 19,380; Referee: Salvador Lax Franco

10 November 2024 14	Albacete	2-2	Oviedo	Albacete
18:30	Quiles 46' (pen.); Rueda 62'	Report	Alemão 30', 58'	Stadium: Estadio Carlos Belmonte; Attendance: 11,327; Referee: Muresan

17 November 2024 15	Oviedo	3-1	Tenerife	Oviedo
14:00	Sibo 9'; Hassan 16'; Seoane 68'	Report	León 81'	Stadium: Estadio Carlos Tartiere; Attendance: 21,126; Referee: Germán Cid Camacho

24 November 2024 16	Elche	4-0	Oviedo	Elche
21:00	Nico 5' (pen.), 53'; Álvarez 48'; Castro 83'	Report		Stadium: Estadio Martínez Valero; Attendance: 13,998; Referee: Jon Ander González Esteban

29 November 2024 17	Oviedo	0-3	Huesca	Oviedo
20:30		Report	Sergi Enrich 15', 48'; Joaquín 81'	Stadium: Estadio Carlos Tartiere; Attendance: 17,475; Referee: Iosu Galech Apezteguía

8 December 2024 18	Racing Ferrol	1-5	Oviedo	Ferrol
14:00	Álvaro 87' (pen.)	Report	Cazorla 42' (pen.); Lucas 52'; Portillo 63'; Alemão 91', 98'	Stadium: Esatdio A Malata; Attendance: 6,823; Referee: Muñiz Muñoz

14 December 2024 19	Oviedo	2-0	Granada	Oviedo
21:00	Colombatto 81' (pen.); Paraschiv 85'	Report		Stadium: Estadio Carlos Tartiere; Attendance: 17,421; Referee: Daniel Palencia Caballero

17 December 2024 20	Real Zaragoza	2-3	Oviedo	Ferrol
21:15	Liso 21'; Adu Ares 32'	Report	Ilyas 50', 92'; Alemão 65'	Stadium: La Romareda; Referee: Manuel Ángel Pérez Hernández

21 December 2024 21	Oviedo	2-3	Córdoba	Oviedo
16:15	Luengo 44'; Ilyas 61'	Report	Obolskiy 6'; Martínez 21'; Théo 50'	Stadium: Estadio Carlos Tartiere; Attendance: 20,043; Referee: Eder Mallo Fernández

11 January 2025 22	Oviedo	1-1	Sporting Gijón	Oviedo
21:00	Hassan 48'	Report	Gelabert 79'	Stadium: Estadio Carlos Tartiere; Attendance: 28,123; Referee: Miguel Sesma Espinosa

17 January 2025 23	Cartagena	0-1	Oviedo	Cartagena
20:30		Report	Alemão 27'	Stadium: Estadio Cartagonova; Attendance: 3,690; Referee: Marta Huerta de Aza

26 January 2025 24	Oviedo	1-0	Castellón	Oviedo
16:15	Alemão 93'	Report		Stadium: Estadio Carlos Tartiere; Attendance: 21,122; Referee: Germán Cid Camacho

1 February 2025 25	Almería	1-1	Oviedo	Almería
18:30	Suárez 75'	Report	Alemão 40'	Stadium: UD Almería Stadium; Attendance: 12,081; Referee: Saúl Ais Reig

10 February 2025 26	Oviedo	0-0	Eldense	Oviedo
20:30		Report		Stadium: Estadio Carlos Tartiere; Attendance: 17,066; Referee: Dámaso Arcediano Monescillo

16 February 2025 27	Oviedo	1-0	Albacete	Oviedo
21:00	Nacho 43'	Report		Stadium: Estadio Carlos Tartiere; Attendance: 16,888; Referee: Rubén Ávalos Barrera

22 February 2025 28	Burgos	1-2	Oviedo	Burgos
16:15	Borja 28'	Report	Alemão 40'; Dani Calvo 55'	Stadium: Estadio El Plantío; Attendance: 11,156; Referee: José Luis Guzmán Mansilla

2 March 2025 29	Oviedo	1-2	Deportivo La Coruña	Oviedo
16:15	Ilyas 38'	Report	Mario 23'; Navarro 91'	Stadium: Estadio Carlos Tartiere; Attendance: 25,081; Referee: Muresan

8 March 2025 30	Mirandés	1-0	Oviedo	Miranda de Ebro
16:15	Panichelli 54' (pen.)	Report		Stadium: Estadio Municipal de Anduva; Attendance: 4,378; Referee: Miguel Sesma Espinosa

14 March 2025 31	Oviedo	1-1	Elche	Oviedo
21:30	Cazorla 62' (pen.)	Report	Josan 22'	Stadium: Estadio Carlos Tartiere; Attendance: 18,750; Referee: Manuel Ángel Pérez Hernández

22 March 2025 32	Granada	v	Oviedo	Granada
22:00				Stadium: Estadio Nuevo Los Cármenes

30 March 2025 33	Oviedo	v	Málaga	Oviedo
16:15				Stadium: Estadio Carlos Tartiere

5 April 2025 34	Eibar	v	Oviedo	Eibar
				Stadium: Estadio Municipal de Ipurúa

12 April 2025 35	Oviedo	v	Racing Ferrol	Oviedo
				Stadium: Estadio Carlos Tartiere

19 April 2025 36	Córdoba	v	Oviedo	Córdoba
				Stadium: Estadio Nuevo Arcángel

26 April 2025 37	Oviedo	v	Levante	Oviedo
				Stadium: Estadio Carlos Tartiere

3 May 2025 38	Huesca	v	Oviedo	Huesca
				Stadium: Estadio El Alcoraz

10 May 2025 39	Racing Santander	v	Oviedo	Santander
				Stadium: El Sardinero

17 May 2025 40	Oviedo	v	Real Zaragoza	Oviedo
				Stadium: Estadio Carlos Tartiere

24 May 2025 41	Tenerife	v	Oviedo	Santa Cruz de Tenerife
				Stadium: Estadio Heliodoro Rodríguez López

31 May 2025 42	Oviedo	v	Cádiz	Oviedo
				Stadium: Estadio Carlos Tartiere

=== Copa del Rey ===
31 October 2024 First round	Real Ávila	0-0 (3–0 p)	Oviedo	Ávila
21:00		Report		Stadium: Estadio Adolfo Suárez; Referee: Manuel Jesús Orellana Cid
	Penalties
	Martín (penalty scored); Carrión (penalty scored); Rivas (penalty scored)		(penalty missed) Colombatto; (penalty missed) Lemos; (penalty missed) Moyano
