= Vouéboufla =

- Town and sub-prefecture
- Location in Ivory Coast
- Coordinates: 7°37′N 5°57′W
- Country: Ivory Coast
- District: Sassandra-Marahoué
- Region: Marahoué
- Department: Zuénoula

Population (2014)
  - Total: 20,454
- Time zone: UTC+0 (GMT)

Vouéboufla is a town in central Ivory Coast. It is a sub-prefecture of Zuénoula Department in Marahoué Region, Sassandra-Marahoué District.

Vouéboufla was a commune until March 2012, when it became one of 1,126 communes nationwide that were abolished.

In 2014, the population of the sub-prefecture of Vouéboufla was 20,454.

== Villages ==
The 15 villages of the sub-prefecture of Vouéboufla and their population in 2014 are:

1. Badiéfla (1,242)
2. Bangofla (1,461)
3. Binhoulera (742)
4. Bohfla (510)
5. Brouzra (879)
6. Diéifla (1,642)
7. Gbouédéfla (703)
8. Gounga (1,948)
9. Manamatiefla (130)
10. Petit - Zirifla (171)
11. Pohizra (542)
12. Tueifla (538)
13. Vouéboufla (3,208)
14. Zirifla (2,017)
15. Zougounéfla (2 812)
