= Bonon =

Bonon Brozra
- City, sub-prefecture, and commune
- Location in Ivory Coast
- Coordinates: 6°56′N 6°3′W
- Country: Ivory Coast
- District: Sassandra-Marahoué
- Region: Marahoué
- Department: Bonon

Area
  - Total: 969 km^{2} (374 sq mi)

Population (2021 census)
  - Total: 116,871
  - Density: 121/km^{2} (312/sq mi)
  - City: 92,523
- (2014 census)
- Time zone: UTC+0 (GMT)

Bonon (also known as Brozra) is a city in west-central Ivory Coast. It is a commune and the prefecture of Bonon Department in Marahoué Region, Sassandra-Marahoué District.

In 2021, the population of the sub-prefecture of Bonon was 116,871.

== Villages ==
The 7 villages of the former sub-prefecture of Bonon and their population in 2014 are:

1. Blablata (795)
2. Bognonzra (11 789)
3. Bonon (92 523)
4. Dabouzra (829)
5. Gobazra (3 978)
6. Madieta (788)
7. Ouarébota (1 927)
