= Zaouli =

Traditional dance of the Guro people

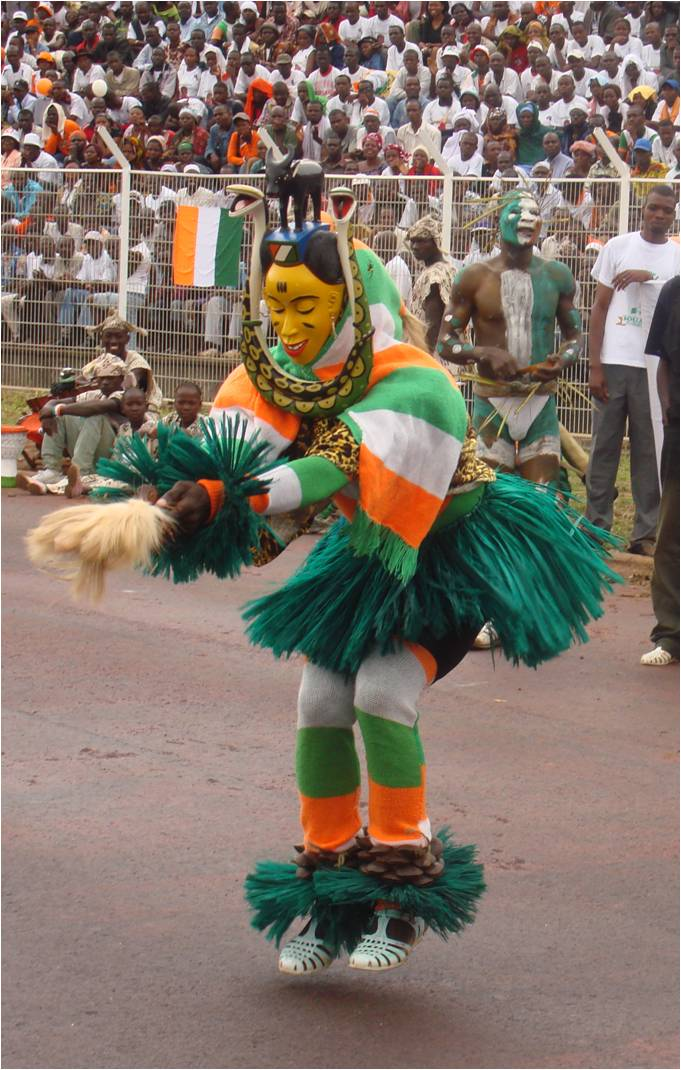
- A Zaouli dancer
- Genre: Traditional dance
- Origin: Guro people, Ivory Coast

Zaouli, popular music and dance of the Guro communities in Côte d’Ivoire
- UNESCO Intangible Cultural Heritage
- Country: Ivory Coast
- Reference: 01255
- Region: Africa

Inscription history
- Inscription: 2017 (12th session)
- List: Representative

Zaouli or Zawli is a traditional dance of the Guro people (who speak the Guro language) of central Ivory Coast. It is performed by a single masked and costumed dancer, accompanied by musicians.

== History ==
The Zaouli mask, used in the dance, was created in the 1950s, reportedly inspired by a girl named "Djela Lou Zaouli" (meaning "Zaouli, daughter of Djela"). Claudie Haxaire traces its origin to the village of Zougounéfla. However, stories on the origins of the characteristic mask are varied, and each mask may have its own symbolic history. It was inscribed in 2017 on the Representative List of the Intangible Cultural Heritage of Humanity by UNESCO. Zaouli is also one of the most difficult dances in the world due its unique and difficult steps.

The dance is performed by a single male dancer wearing a mask depicting a girl. Each Guro village has a local Zaouli dancer (always male), performing during funerals and celebrations. The dance is believed to increase the productivity of the village that it is performed in and is seen as a tool of unity for the Guro community, and by extension the whole country.

Zaouli rose in prominence within the Ivory Coast because it was the favorite dance of Ivorian president Félix Houphouet-Boigny and was regularly broadcast on national TV as a result.

== In popular culture ==
The British-Sri Lankan rapper M.I.A. included a clip of a Zaouli dancer in her music video for the song "Warriors", released as part of the video Matahdatah Scroll 01: Broader Than A Border in 2015.

In 2022, the K-pop girl group Nature released a music video for their single "Rica Rica", featuring choreography which is heavily inspired by Zaouli dance. Some internet users have criticised this use as inappropriate.

Short videos of traditional Zaouli dances are also circulating on the Internet, the soundtrack of which has been replaced by fast, seemingly appropriate rhythms of psytrance music.
