= Alhassane Dosso =

Ivorian footballer

Hassane Dosso
Personal information
- Full name: Alhassane Dosso
- Date of birth: 27 December 1989 (age 36)
- Place of birth: Sinfra, Ivory Coast
- Height: 1.78 m (5 ft 10 in)
- Position: Central midfielder

Team information
- Current team: Dolphins

Youth career
- Issia Wazi

Senior career*
Years	Team	Apps	(Gls)
2004	Issia Wazi		
2005–2008	Sharks		
2009–2011	Lillestrøm	11	(0)
2010	→ Strømmen (loan)	23	(0)
2011–2013	Kongsvinger	46	(0)
2014–	Dolphins		
- * Club domestic league appearances and goals as of 12 August 2013

Alhassane Dosso (born 27 December 1989, in Sinfra) is an Ivorian footballer, who currently plays for Nigeria Premier League side Dolphins.

== Career ==
Dosso began his career for Issia Wazi, and joined along with his Ivorian companions Maurice Bassolé and Mamadou Touré the Nigerian club Sharks in March 2005. He played his first professional game in the mid-season against Gombe United. He left Sharks on 3 January 2009 to join Lillestrøm SK for the 2009 season. On 16 March 2010, Lillestrøm announced he will play on loan for one season with Strømmen IF. He joined Kongsvinger in 2011. After a three-year stint with the Norwegian team, he returned to Nigeria for Dolphins in March 2014.

== Career statistics ==
Season	Club	Division	League		Cup		Total	
Season	Club	Division	Apps	Goals	Apps	Goals	Apps	Goals
2009	Lillestrøm	Tippeligaen	11	0	1	0	12	0
2010	Strømmen	Adeccoligaen	23	0	1	0	24	0
2011	Kongsvinger	Adeccoligaen	20	0	0	0	20	0
2012	Kongsvinger	Adeccoligaen	14	0	1	0	15	0
2013	Kongsvinger	Adeccoligaen	12	0	1	0	13	0
Career Total			80	0	4	0	84	0
