= Kanzra =

- Town and sub-prefecture
- Location in Ivory Coast
- Coordinates: 7°19′N 6°14′W
- Country: Ivory Coast
- District: Sassandra-Marahoué
- Region: Marahoué
- Department: Zuénoula

Population (2014)
  - Total: 27,982
- Time zone: UTC+0 (GMT)

Kanzra is a town in central Ivory Coast. It is a sub-prefecture of Zuénoula Department in Marahoué Region, Sassandra-Marahoué District.

Kanzra was a commune until March 2012, when it became one of 1,126 communes nationwide that were abolished.

In 2014, the population of the sub-prefecture of Kanzra was 27,982.

== Villages ==
The 19 villages of the sub-prefecture of Kanzra and their population in 2014 are:

1. Bagozra (542)
2. Blablata (4,058)
3. Bonéfla (794)
4. Dezra 1 (1,382)
5. Dezra 2 (621)
6. Duafla (461)
7. Gouéhizra (1,431)
8. Kanzra (5,668)
9. Kouablazra (991)
10. Kourera (921)
11. Nénézra (945)
12. Nianoufla (819)
13. Quiezra (279)
14. Srazra (3,022)
15. Vaafla (1,541)
16. Vréhenfla (431)
17. Zangrofla (303)
18. Ziduho-Bouénou (711)
19. Zorofla (3,062)
