= Gohitafla =

- Town, sub-prefecture, and commune
- Location in Ivory Coast
- Coordinates: 7°30′N 5°53′W
- Country: Ivory Coast
- District: Sassandra-Marahoué
- Region: Marahoué
- Department: Gohitafla

Population (2014)
  - Total: 35,440
- Time zone: UTC+0 (GMT)

Gohitafla is a town in central Ivory Coast. It is a sub-prefecture and commune of Gohitafla Department in Marahoué Region, Sassandra-Marahoué District.

In 2014, the population of the sub-prefecture of Gohitafla was 35,440.

== Villages ==
The 19 villages of the sub-prefecture of Gohitafla and their population in 2014 are:

1. Bohidianfla (2 336)
2. Brodoufla (1 214)
3. Diabouéfla (585)
4. Diéhigalafla1 (460)
5. Dorifla (1 777)
6. Gohitafla (9 658)
7. Grazra (895)
8. Kouaisséizra 2 (1 256)
9. Ouréitafla (1 092)
10. Viéproye (1 745)
11. Zrabissiéfla 1 (1 913)
12. Bohikouaifla (2 083)
13. Bongofla (2 334)
14. Goafla (880)
15. Gohounfla (739)
16. Gouzanfla (876)
17. Kouafla (710)
18. Ouinéfla (545)
19. Zraluo (4 342)
