= Haissem Hassan =

Egypt international footballer (born 2002)

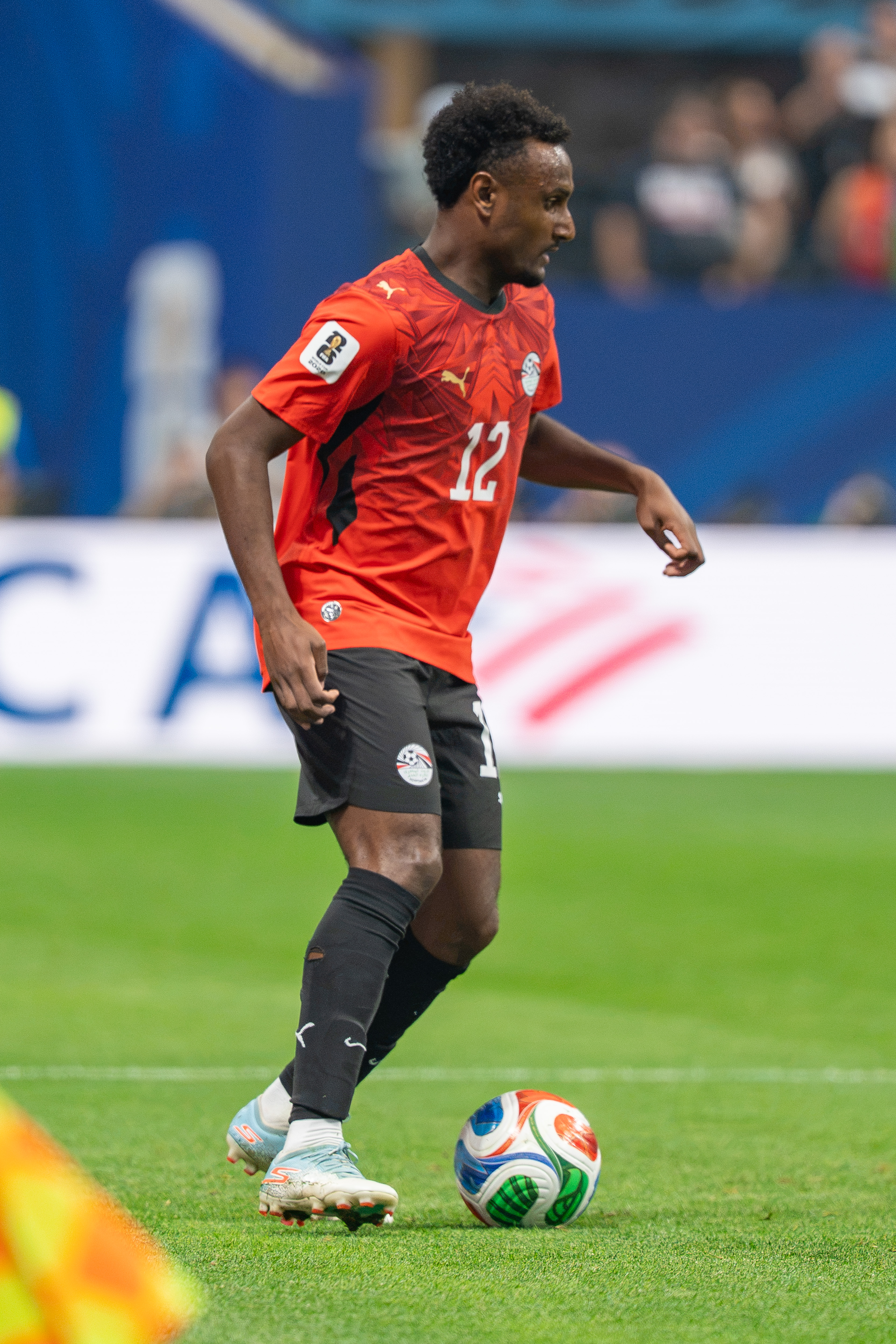
- Hassan with Egypt in 2026

Personal information
- Full name: Haissem Yousry Fouad A. Hassan
- Date of birth: 8 February 2002 (age 24)
- Place of birth: Paris, France
- Height: 1.78 m (5 ft 10 in)
- Position: Right winger

Team information
- Current team: Celtic
- Number: 23

Youth career
- 2008–2010: Porte de Bagnolet
- 2010–2017: Paris FC
- 2017–2018: Châteauroux

Senior career*
Years	Team	Apps	(Gls)
2018–2020	Châteauroux II	18	(4)
2018–2020	Châteauroux	17	(0)
2020–2023	Villarreal B	51	(2)
2021–2022	→ Mirandés (loan)	35	(3)
2023–2024	Villarreal	2	(0)
2023–2024	→ Sporting Gijón (loan)	38	(1)
2024–2026	Real Oviedo	76	(4)
2026–	Celtic	10	(0)

International career^{‡}
2018–2019	France U17	7	(2)
2019–2020	France U18	9	(1)
2026–	Egypt	8	(0)
Medal record
Men's football
Representing France
FIFA U-17 World Cup
Third place	2019 Brazil
- * Club domestic league appearances and goals as of 1 November 2026 ‡ National team caps and goals as of 29 September 2026

Haissem Yousry Fouad A. Hassan (Note: Egyptian Arabic: هيثم يسرى فؤاد حسن) (born 8 February 2002) is an Egyptian professional footballer who plays as a right winger for Scottish Premiership club Celtic. Born in France to an Egyptian father and Tunisian mother, he plays for the Egypt national team. He has been recognised for his proficiency in dribbling.

== Club career ==
Hassan signed his first professional contract with Châteauroux on 1 June 2018 at the age of 16. He made his professional debut with Châteauroux in a 0–0 Ligue 2 tie with Paris FC on 19 October 2018.

=== Villarreal ===
On 2 October 2020, Hassan signed a four-year contract with Villarreal CF, being initially assigned to the reserves in Segunda División B. The following 9 August, he moved to Segunda División side CD Mirandés on a one-year loan deal.

On 1 August 2023, Hassan renewed his contract with the Yellow Submarine until 2025, and was loaned to Sporting de Gijón in the second division for the season.

=== Real Oviedo ===
On 11 August 2024, Hassan moved to Segunda División club Real Oviedo, on a three-year contract. Later that year, on 22 October, he scored his first goal in a 4–1 victory over his former club CD Mirandés. In the 2024–25 season, he was part of the team that earned promotion to La Liga for the first time in 24 years.

Following the conclusion of Egypt's 2026 World Cup campaign in July 2026, Hassan was linked with Celtic in Scotland, and later Marseille in France. On 10 July, Real Oviedo rejected an opening €4 million (£3.4 million) bid for Hassan from Celtic, submitted two days prior. Oviedo reportedly also referred Celtic to his €12 million release clause. On 19 July, reports stated that Celtic had submitted a new and "substantial financial offer" for Hassan.

=== Celtic ===
On 12 August 2026, Hassan signed a four-year contract with Celtic with an option for another year.

== International career ==
Hassan was born in Paris, France to an Egyptian father from Aswan, and a Tunisian mother. He was a youth international for France.

In March 2026, Hassan decided to join the Egyptian national team ahead of the March International Window and to play for his father's country at the 2026 FIFA World Cup. He was later named in the 26-man squad for the 2026 FIFA World Cup. He made his World Cup debut as a substitute in the round of 32 victory against Australia. After the match, Hassan said: "Honestly it's incredible, because you know that in Egypt there are 120 million people you've made happy today, and you know that today there will be celebrations across the whole country ... Knowing that you made so many people happy makes you happy too. ... Today is a day to celebrate." Head coach Hossam Hassan later revealed that Hassan did not play in the opening group-stage games against Belgium, New Zealand and Iran "due to certain internal matters that I cannot go into, as some paperwork caused a delay in his participation." Hassan started against Argentina in the round of 16. He produced a "possessed run down the right wing in the second half, weaving his way through half the pitch," to set up an attack from which Mostafa Ziko scored, but the goal was later controversially disallowed. Taha Hashim of The Guardian called Hassan's contribution "a move straight out of the Messi playbook", and described the effort as "the greatest goal that never was". Hassan then assisted Ziko for another goal, helping his team take a 2–0 lead before they eventually lost 3–2.

== Style of play ==
Hassan is a winger known for his direct attacking style, dribbling ability, and willingness to take on defenders. Primarily operating on the right flank, he is noted for his ball-carrying and chance creation. He ranks among the top 7% of wingers in Europe's top five leagues for successful dribbles and the top 1% for progressive carries, although he has been criticised for his lack of goalscoring.

== Career statistics ==
=== Club ===
As of match played 5 November 2026

Appearances and goals by club, season and competition
Club	Season	League			National cup (Note: Includes Coupe de France, Copa del Rey, Scottish Cup)		League cup (Note: Includes Coupe de la Ligue, Scottish League Cup)		Europe		Other		Total	
Club	Season	Division	Apps	Goals	Apps	Goals	Apps	Goals	Apps	Goals	Apps	Goals	Apps	Goals
Châteauroux II	2018–19	Championnat National 3	15	3	—		—		—		—		15	3
Châteauroux II	2019–20	Championnat National 3	3	1	—		—		—		—		3	1
Châteauroux II	Total		18	4	—		—		—		—		18	4
Châteauroux	2018–19	Ligue 2	4	0	1	0	0	0	—		—		5	0
Châteauroux	2019–20	Ligue 2	13	0	0	0	1	0	—		—		14	0
Châteauroux	Total		17	0	1	0	1	0	—		—		19	0
Villarreal B	2020–21	Segunda División B	24	2	—		—		—		—		24	2
Villarreal B	2022–23	Segunda División	27	0	—		—		—		—		27	0
Villarreal B	Total		51	2	—		—		—		—		51	2
Mirandés (loan)	2021–22	Segunda División	35	3	3	0	—		—		—		38	3
Villarreal	2022–23	La Liga	2	0	—		—		—		—		2	0
Sporting Gijón (loan)	2023–24	Segunda División	38	1	2	1	—		—		2 (Note: Appearances in La Liga play-offs)	0	42	2
Real Oviedo	2024–25	Segunda División	39	4	1	0	—		—		4	0	44	4
Real Oviedo	2025–26	La Liga	37	0	1	0	—		—		—		38	0
Real Oviedo	Total		76	4	2	0	—		—		4	0	82	4
Celtic	2026–27	Scottish Premiership	10	0	0	0	2	0	5 (Note: One appearance in UEFA Champions League, three appearances in UEFA Europa League)	0	—		17	0
Career total			247	14	8	1	3	0	5	0	6	0	269	15

=== International ===
As of match played 29 September 2026

Appearances and goals by national team and year
National team	Year	Apps	Goals
Egypt	2026	8	0
Total		8	0

== Honours ==
France U17

- FIFA U-17 World Cup third place: 2019
