= Zuénoula =

- Town, sub-prefecture, and commune
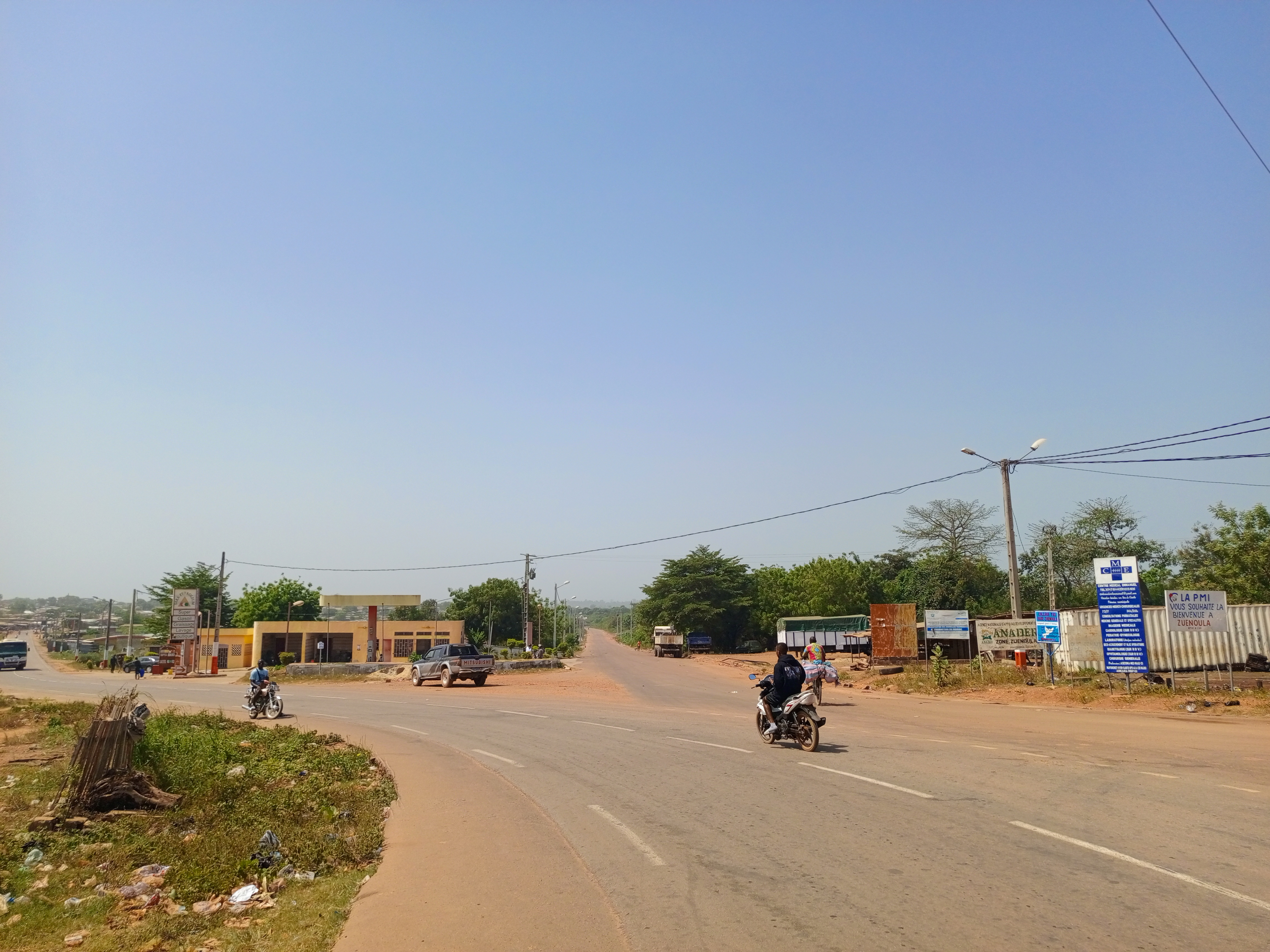

- Location in Ivory Coast
- Coordinates: 7°26′N 6°3′W
- Country: Ivory Coast
- District: Sassandra-Marahoué
- Region: Marahoué
- Department: Zuénoula

Area
  - Total: 895 km^{2} (346 sq mi)

Population (2021 census)
  - Total: 78,613
  - Density: 87.8/km^{2} (227/sq mi)
  - Town: 34,018
- (2014 census)
- Time zone: UTC+0 (GMT)

Zuénoula is a town in central Ivory Coast. It is a sub-prefecture of and the seat of Zuénoula Department in Marahoué Region, Sassandra-Marahoué District. Zuénoula is also a commune.

In 2021, the population of the sub-prefecture of Zuénoula was 78,613.

== Villages ==
The 36 villages of the sub-prefecture of Zuénoula and their population in 2014 are:

1. Baazra 1 (773)
2. Baazra 2 (400)
3. Banoufla 2 (226)
4. Bohizra (1 568)
5. Diéoulizra 1 (867)
6. Diéoulizra 2 (540)
7. Bangofla
8. Zougounéfla
9. Drikouaifla 1 (942)
10. Drikouaifla 2 (900)
11. Gaizra (966)
12. Ganzra (481)
13. Goaboifla (706)
14. Gonhounfla (799)
15. Gouatifla (916)
16. Gouéra (767)
17. Kaya-Ziduho (1 380)
18. Klazra (377)
19. Koudougou (916)
20. Kouézra 2 (3 429)
21. Pohizra 1 (911)
22. Séïzra 3 (567)
23. Zuénoula (34 018)
24. Binzra (5 277)
25. Bogopinfla (2 700)
26. Douanoufla (597)
27. Gohifla (2 566)
28. Goréta (696)
29. Grohounfla (1 525)
30. Kavaka (1 236)
31. Koinfla (936)
32. Kouréfla 1 (833)
33. Kouréfla 2 (369)
34. Minfla (4 322)
35. Paoubigrofla (1 700)
36. Paoufla (2 880)
37. Vaniébotifla (2 252)
38. Zigofla (611)
