= Rahim Alhassane =

Footballer (born 2002)

Abdel Rahim
Personal information
- Full name: Abdel Rahim Alhassane Bonkano
- Date of birth: 1 January 2002 (age 24)
- Place of birth: Abuja, Nigeria
- Height: 1.84 m (6 ft 0 in)
- Position: Left-back

Team information
- Current team: Bologna
- Number: 23

Youth career
- 2020–2021: Rayo Majadahonda

Senior career*
Years	Team	Apps	(Gls)
2020–2021	Paracuellos Antamira	5	(0)
2021–2023	Rayo Majadahonda	20	(0)
2021–2022	→ Gimnástica Segoviana (loan)	13	(0)
2023–2024	Recreativo Huelva	33	(1)
2024–2026	Oviedo	52	(0)
2026–	Bologna	3	(0)

International career^{‡}
2022–	Niger	30	(0)
- * Club domestic league appearances and goals as of 11 October 2026 ‡ National team caps and goals as of 8 June 2026

Abdel Rahim Alhassane Bonkano (born 1 January 2002), sometimes known as Abdel Rahim, is a professional footballer who plays as a left-back for Serie A club Bologna. Born in Nigeria, he plays for the Niger national team.

== Club career ==
=== Early career ===
After playing for the Juvenil side of CF Rayo Majadahonda, Alhassane made his senior debut with farm team CD Paracuellos Antamira in 2020. On 1 September 2021, he was loaned to Segunda División RFEF side Gimnástica Segoviana CF for one year.

After featuring sparingly, Alhassane returned to the Majariegos in July 2022, being included in the main squad in Primera Federación. He terminated his contract with the club in the following year, and signed a two-year deal with fellow third division side Recreativo de Huelva on 4 August 2023.

=== Oviedo ===
On 15 July 2024, Alhassane agreed to a three-year contract with Segunda División club Real Oviedo. He made his professional debut on 17 August, starting in a 1–0 away win over Deportivo de La Coruña, and finished the season as a first-choice ahead of Carlos Pomares as the club achieved promotion to La Liga.

Alhassane made his debut in the top tier of Spanish football on 15 August 2025, starting in a 2–0 away loss to Villarreal CF.

=== Bologna ===
On 20 July 2026, Alhassane left Spain and joined Serie A side Bologna.

== International career ==
Born in Nigeria, Alhassane is of Nigerien descent. He debuted with the Niger national team on 23 March 2022, in a 1–1 friendly draw against Mozambique.

== Career statistics ==
=== Club ===
As of match played 11 October 2026

Appearances and goals by club, season and competition
Club	Season	League			Cup		Europe		Other		Total	
Club	Season	Division	Apps	Goals	Apps	Goals	Apps	Goals	Apps	Goals	Apps	Goals
Paracuellos Antamira	2020–21	Tercera División	5	0	—		—		—		5	0
Rayo Majadahonda	2021–22	Primera Federación	0	0	—		—		—		0	0
Rayo Majadahonda	2022–23	Primera Federación	20	0	1	0	—		—		21	0
Rayo Majadahonda	Total		20	0	1	0	—		—		21	0
Gimnástica Segoviana (loan)	2021–22	Segunda Federación	13	0	1	0	—		—		14	0
Recreativo Huelva	2023–24	Primera Federación	33	1	1	0	—		—		32	1
Oviedo	2024–25	Segunda División	25	0	0	0	—		4 (Note: Appearances in 2025 Segunda División play-offs)	0	29	0
Oviedo	2025–26	Segunda División	27	0	1	0	—		—		28	0
Oviedo	Total		52	0	1	0	—		4	0	57	0
Bologna	2026–27	Serie A	3	0	0	0	—		—		3	0
Career total			124	1	4	0	0	0	4	0	132	1

=== International ===
As of match played 8 June 2026

Appearances and goals by national team and year
National team	Year	Apps	Goals
Niger	2022	4	0
Niger	2023	8	0
Niger	2024	6	0
Niger	2025	8	0
Niger	2026	4	0
Total		30	0
