= Maminigui =

- Town and sub-prefecture
- Location in Ivory Coast
- Coordinates: 7°24′N 5°51′W
- Country: Ivory Coast
- District: Sassandra-Marahoué
- Region: Marahoué
- Department: Zuénoula

Population (2014)
  - Total: 25,047
- Time zone: UTC+0 (GMT)

Maminigui is a town in central Ivory Coast. It is a sub-prefecture of the Zuénoula Department in the Marahoué Region, Sassandra-Marahoué District.

Maminigui was a commune until March 2012, when it became one of 1,126 communes nationwide that were abolished.

In 2014, the population of the sub-prefecture of Maminigui was 25,047.

== Villages ==
The seven villages of the sub-prefecture of Maminigui and their population in 2014 are:

1. Bibikorefla (859)
2. Gouenfla (576)
3. Gueriefla (2,747)
4. Maminigui (5,319)
5. Manfla (9,374)
6. Soribouafla (947)
7. Zambléfla (632)
