= Iriéfla =

Iriéfla Iréfla
- Town and sub-prefecture
- Location in Ivory Coast
- Coordinates: 7°41′N 5°51′W
- Country: Ivory Coast
- District: Sassandra-Marahoué
- Region: Marahoué
- Department: Zuénoula

Population (2014)
  - Total: 6,229
- Time zone: UTC+0 (GMT)

Iriéfla (also spelled Iréfla) is a town in central Ivory Coast. It is a sub-prefecture of Zuénoula Department in Marahoué Region, Sassandra-Marahoué District. The town is five kilometres south of the border of Woroba District.

Iriéfla was a commune until March 2012, when it became one of 1,126 communes nationwide that were abolished.

In 2014, the population of the sub-prefecture of Iriéfla was 6,229.

== Villages ==
The four villages of the sub-prefecture of Iriéfla and their population in 2014 are:

1. Iriefla (3,011)
2. Kaloufla (2,291)
3. Tofla (589)
4. Trabimenefla (338)
