= Marco Esteban =

Spanish footballer (born 2006)

Personal information
- Full name: Marco Esteban Fernández
- Date of birth: 1 March 2006 (age 20)
- Place of birth: Oviedo, Spain
- Height: 1.83 m (6 ft 0 in)
- Position: Centre-back

Team information
- Current team: Oviedo
- Number: 30

Youth career
- Astur
- 2014–2023: Oviedo

Senior career*
Years	Team	Apps	(Gls)
2023–	Oviedo B	99	(5)
2024–	Oviedo	2	(0)
- * Club domestic league appearances and goals as of 14 May 2026

Marco Esteban Fernández (born 1 March 2006) is a Spanish footballer who plays as a centre-back for Real Oviedo.

== Career ==
Born in Oviedo, Asturias, Esteban joined Real Oviedo's youth setup from Astur CF. He made his senior debut with the reserves on 4 February 2023, coming on as a late substitute in a 2–1 Segunda Federación away win over Burgos CF Promesas.

Esteban scored his first senior goal on 15 October 2023, netting Vetusta's opener in a 2–0 home win over Coruxo FC. He made his first team debut the following 13 January, starting in a 1–1 home draw against SD Amorebieta in the Segunda División.
