= Bouaflé =

- City, sub-prefecture, and commune
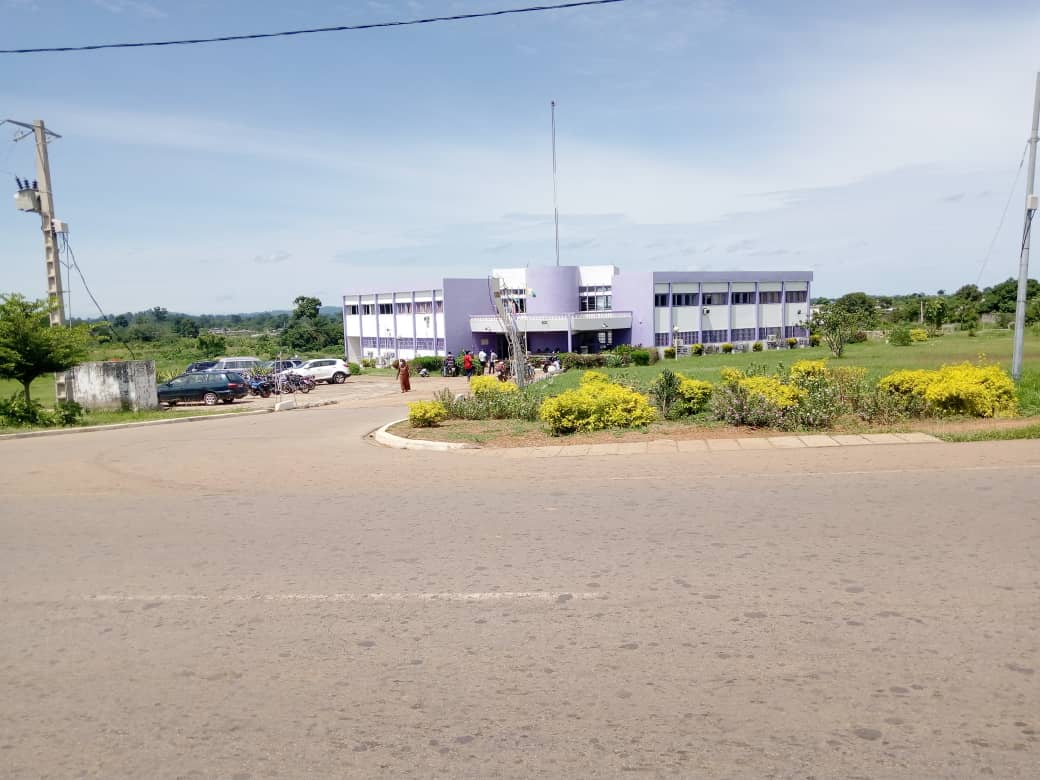

- Location in Ivory Coast
- Coordinates: 6°59′N 5°45′W
- Country: Ivory Coast
- District: Sassandra-Marahoué
- Region: Marahoué
- Department: Bouaflé

Area
  - Total: 1,250 km^{2} (480 sq mi)

Population (2021 census)
  - Total: 213,967
  - Density: 171/km^{2} (443/sq mi)
  - City: 80,389
- (2014 census)
- Time zone: UTC+0 (GMT)

Bouaflé is a city in central Ivory Coast. It is a sub-prefecture of and the seat of Bouaflé Department. It is also the seat of Marahoué Region in Sassandra-Marahoué District and a commune.

In 2021, the population of the sub-prefecture of Bouaflé was 213,967.

== Villages ==
The 47 villages of the sub-prefecture of Bouaflé and their population in 2014 are:

1. Angovia (+3000)
2. Duonfla (4 479)
3. Kouakougnanou (+2000)
4. Allangba - Konankro (1 273)
5. Allekran (432)
6. Alley (430)
7. Baonfla (7 223)
8. Bazi (2 905)
9. Blama (153)
10. Blanfla (3 194)
11. Bokassou (457)
12. Bouaflé (80 389)
13. Bozi (3 982)
14. Bozi 2 (1 043)
15. Bozi Satmaci (2 247)
16. Degbézéré (1 402)
17. Dioulabougou (622)
18. Garango (6 870)
19. Gourgui (173)
20. Guézanoufla (1 093)
21. Hallanikro (4 197)
22. Kaviessou (1 640)
23. Kikiékro (395)
24. Koffikro (280)
25. Kongo Yobouessou (1 045)
26. Konéfla (1 517)
27. Kouassi-Périta (792)
28. Koudougou (5 342)
29. Koupéla (1 655)
30. Liadjénoufla 1 (3 190)
31. Liadjénoufla 2 (335)
32. Lotanzia (236)
33. N'gattakro (908)
34. N'gorankro (741)
35. Ouanzanou (698)
36. Oussou Yaokro (1 626)
37. Pakogui (849)
38. Patizia (1 397)
39. Samanifla (1 795)
40. Sinfla (622)
41. Siétinfla (8 026)
42. Suefla (4 192)
43. Tangono Bouita (326)
44. Tenkodogo (1 299)
45. Tuankro (315)
46. Yoho (1 753)
47. Zagouta (863)
48. Zougoussou (1 846)
49. Zégata-Yaouré (1 016)

== Politics ==
=== Administration ===
List of successive mayors
| Date of election | Name | Party | Status |
|---|---|---|---|
| 1980 | Zamblé Bi Zamblé Alphonse | PDCI-RDA | Elected |
| 1985 | Philippe Cowppli-Bony | PDCI-RDA | Elected |
| 2000 | Adjé Dominique | PDCI-RDA | Elected |
| 2013 | Léhié Bi Kribou Lucien | PDCI-RDA | Elected |
| 2021 | Léhié Bi Kribou Lucien | PDCI-RDA | Elected |
| 2022 | Azi Serge Koffi | | Elected |
| 2023 | Yao Etienne | RHDP | Elected |
