= 2018 Kyoto Sanga FC season =

Kyoto Sanga FC
2018 season
- Manager: Takanori Nunobe; Boško Gjurovski
- Stadium: Kyoto Nishikyogoku Athletic Stadium
- J2 League: 19th
Home colours	Away colours

2018 Kyoto Sanga FC season.

== J2 League ==
Match	Date	Team	Score	Team	Venue	Attendance
1	2018.02.25	Kyoto Sanga FC	0-2	FC Machida Zelvia	Kyoto Nishikyogoku Athletic Stadium	6,225
2	2018.03.03	Avispa Fukuoka	2-2	Kyoto Sanga FC	Level5 Stadium	6,816
3	2018.03.11	Albirex Niigata	1-1	Kyoto Sanga FC	Denka Big Swan Stadium	14,239
4	2018.03.17	Kyoto Sanga FC	2-1	FC Gifu	Kyoto Nishikyogoku Athletic Stadium	5,436
5	2018.03.21	Kyoto Sanga FC	0-1	Fagiano Okayama	Kyoto Nishikyogoku Athletic Stadium	3,639
6	2018.03.25	JEF United Chiba	2-0	Kyoto Sanga FC	Fukuda Denshi Arena	9,737
7	2018.03.31	Kyoto Sanga FC	1-1	Kamatamare Sanuki	Kyoto Nishikyogoku Athletic Stadium	5,063
8	2018.04.07	Kyoto Sanga FC	0-1	Oita Trinita	Kyoto Nishikyogoku Athletic Stadium	5,099
9	2018.04.15	Montedio Yamagata	1-0	Kyoto Sanga FC	ND Soft Stadium Yamagata	4,911
10	2018.04.21	Kyoto Sanga FC	1-2	Roasso Kumamoto	Kyoto Nishikyogoku Athletic Stadium	4,405
11	2018.04.28	Mito HollyHock	1-2	Kyoto Sanga FC	K's denki Stadium Mito	4,366
12	2018.05.03	Tochigi SC	3-1	Kyoto Sanga FC	Tochigi Green Stadium	4,643
13	2018.05.06	Kyoto Sanga FC	1-2	Renofa Yamaguchi FC	Kyoto Nishikyogoku Athletic Stadium	7,093
14	2018.05.12	Tokushima Vortis	1-0	Kyoto Sanga FC	Pocarisweat Stadium	4,713
15	2018.05.20	Ehime FC	1-2	Kyoto Sanga FC	Ningineer Stadium	3,741
16	2018.05.26	Kyoto Sanga FC	0-2	Yokohama FC	Kyoto Nishikyogoku Athletic Stadium	8,713
17	2018.06.02	Zweigen Kanazawa	1-3	Kyoto Sanga FC	Ishikawa Athletics Stadium	5,473
18	2018.06.09	Kyoto Sanga FC	0-1	Matsumoto Yamaga FC	Kyoto Nishikyogoku Athletic Stadium	8,149
19	2018.06.16	Tokyo Verdy	3-1	Kyoto Sanga FC	Ajinomoto Stadium	4,463
20	2018.06.23	Kyoto Sanga FC	0-3	Omiya Ardija	Kyoto Nishikyogoku Athletic Stadium	4,218
21	2018.06.30	Ventforet Kofu	1-1	Kyoto Sanga FC	Yamanashi Chuo Bank Stadium	8,796
23	2018.07.16	Kyoto Sanga FC	0-1	Mito HollyHock	Kyoto Nishikyogoku Athletic Stadium	3,302
24	2018.07.21	Matsumoto Yamaga FC	1-0	Kyoto Sanga FC	Matsumotodaira Park Stadium	12,003
25	2018.07.25	FC Machida Zelvia	2-1	Kyoto Sanga FC	Machida Stadium	2,549
26	2018.07.29	Kyoto Sanga FC	0-1	Tokyo Verdy	Kyoto Nishikyogoku Athletic Stadium	4,337
27	2018.08.04	Kyoto Sanga FC	1-0	Montedio Yamagata	Kyoto Nishikyogoku Athletic Stadium	3,949
28	2018.08.11	FC Gifu	2-3	Kyoto Sanga FC	Gifu Nagaragawa Stadium	7,003
29	2018.08.18	Renofa Yamaguchi FC	1-2	Kyoto Sanga FC	Ishin Me-Life Stadium	6,060
30	2018.08.25	Kyoto Sanga FC	1-1	Ventforet Kofu	Kyoto Nishikyogoku Athletic Stadium	5,483
31	2018.09.01	Yokohama FC	3-1	Kyoto Sanga FC	NHK Spring Mitsuzawa Football Stadium	3,519
32	2018.09.08	Kyoto Sanga FC	0-0	Zweigen Kanazawa	Kyoto Nishikyogoku Athletic Stadium	4,550
33	2018.09.15	Fagiano Okayama	2-2	Kyoto Sanga FC	City Light Stadium	13,851
34	2018.09.22	Kyoto Sanga FC	0-2	Tochigi SC	Kyoto Nishikyogoku Athletic Stadium	5,299
22	2018.09.26	Kyoto Sanga FC	1-0	Avispa Fukuoka	Kyoto Nishikyogoku Athletic Stadium	2,624
35	2018.09.30	Roasso Kumamoto	0-4	Kyoto Sanga FC	Egao Kenko Stadium	3,429
36	2018.10.07	Oita Trinita	2-1	Kyoto Sanga FC	Oita Bank Dome	9,563
37	2018.10.13	Kyoto Sanga FC	1-0	Tokushima Vortis	Kyoto Nishikyogoku Athletic Stadium	5,930
38	2018.10.20	Kyoto Sanga FC	0-2	Albirex Niigata	Kyoto Nishikyogoku Athletic Stadium	8,883
39	2018.10.28	Omiya Ardija	1-2	Kyoto Sanga FC	NACK5 Stadium Omiya	9,527
40	2018.11.04	Kyoto Sanga FC	0-1	Ehime FC	Kyoto Nishikyogoku Athletic Stadium	9,036
41	2018.11.10	Kyoto Sanga FC	0-3	JEF United Chiba	Kyoto Nishikyogoku Athletic Stadium	7,498
42	2018.11.17	Kamatamare Sanuki	0-2	Kyoto Sanga FC	Pikara Stadium	3,636
