= Campo Erê =

Municipality in Santa Catarina, Brazil

- Municipality

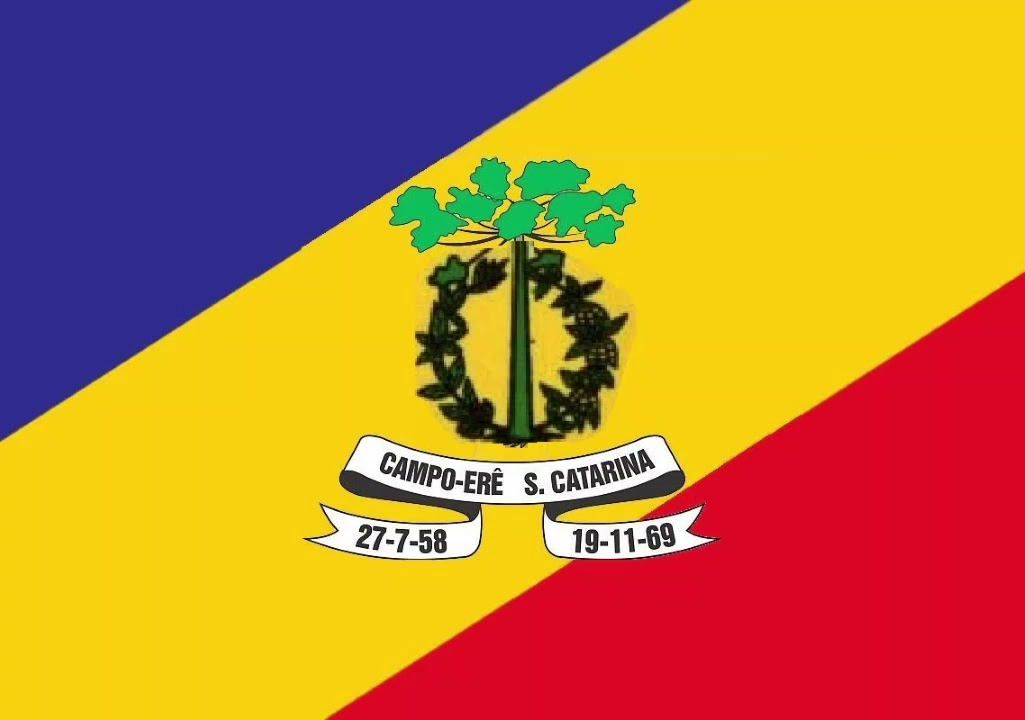
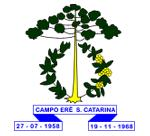
- Flag Coat of arms

- Location in Brazil
- Coordinates: 26°23′S 53°03′W
- Country: Brazil
- Region: South
- State: Santa Catarina
- Mesoregion: Oeste Catarinense

Population (2020)
  - Total: 8,418
- Time zone: UTC -3
- Website: https://campoere.sc.gov.br/

Campo Erê is a municipality in the state of Santa Catarina in the South region of Brazil.

== See also ==
- List of municipalities in Santa Catarina
