= Sinfra Department =

Coordinates: 6°51′N 5°55′W

Sinfra Department Département de Sinfra
- Department
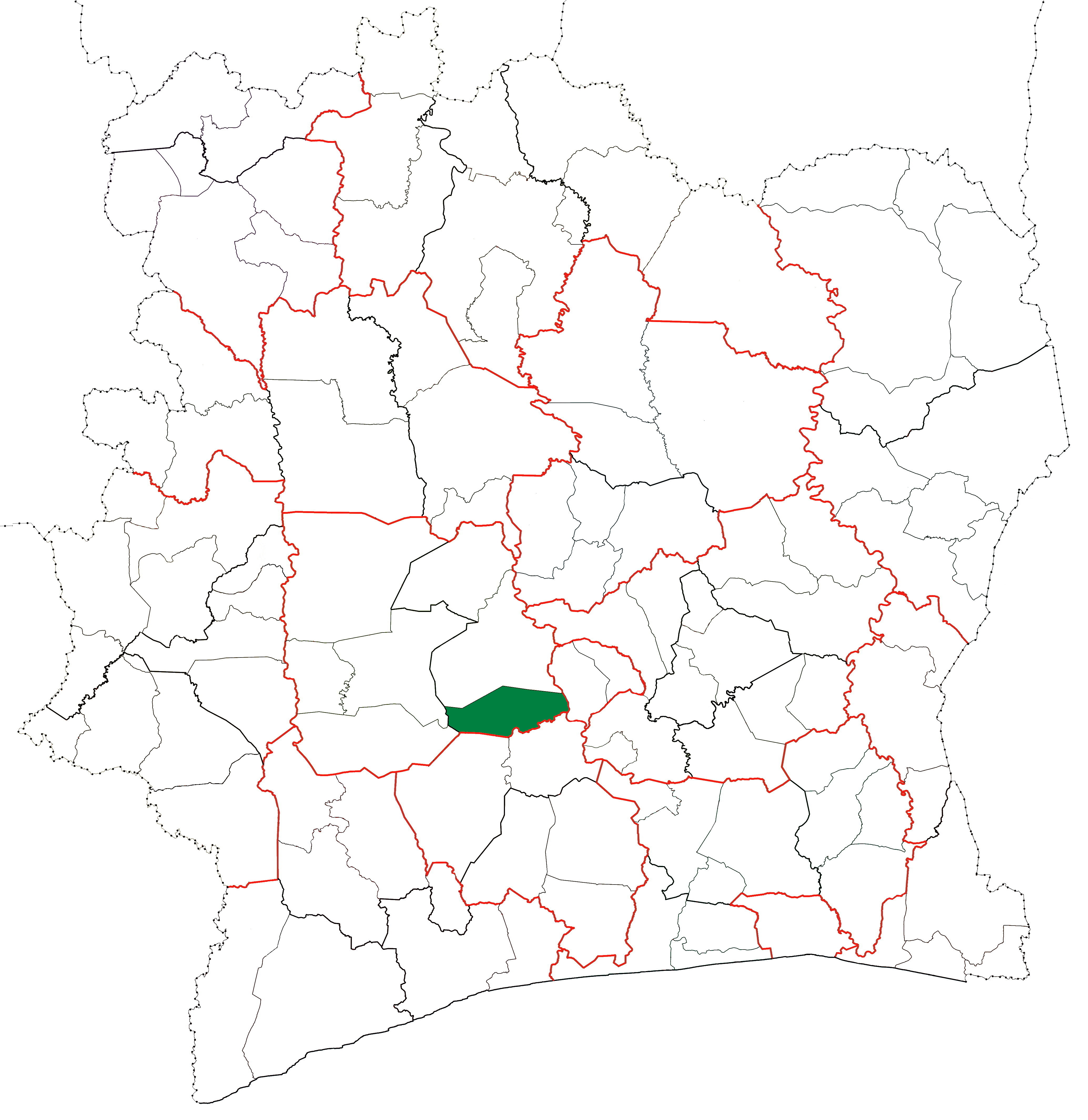
- Location in Ivory Coast. Sinfra Department has retained the same boundaries since its creation in 1988.
- Country: Ivory Coast
- District: Sassandra-Marahoué
- Region: Marahoué
- 1988: Established as a first-level subdivision via a division of Bouaflé Dept
- 1997: Converted to a second-level subdivision
- 2011: Converted to a third-level subdivision
- Departmental seat: Sinfra

Government
  - Prefect: Konian Niasson

Area
  - Total: 1,700 km^{2} (660 sq mi)

Population (2021 census)
  - Total: 245,226
  - Density: 140/km^{2} (370/sq mi)
- Time zone: UTC+0 (GMT)

Sinfra Department is a department of Marahoué Region in Sassandra-Marahoué District, Ivory Coast. In 2021, its population was 245,226 and its seat is the settlement of Sinfra. The sub-prefectures of the department are Bazré, Kononfla, Kouétinfla, and Sinfra.

== History ==
Sinfra Department was created in 1988 as a first-level subdivision via a split-off from Bouaflé Department.

In 1997, regions were introduced as new first-level subdivisions of Ivory Coast; as a result, all departments were converted into second-level subdivisions. Sinfra Department was included in Marahoué Region.

In 2011, districts were introduced as new first-level subdivisions of Ivory Coast. At the same time, regions were reorganised and became second-level subdivisions and all departments were converted into third-level subdivisions. At this time, Sinfra Department remained part of the retained Marahoué Region in the new Sassandra-Marahoué District.
