= Sinfra =

- City, sub-prefecture, and commune
- Location in Ivory Coast
- Coordinates: 6°51′N 5°55′W
- Country: Ivory Coast
- District: Sassandra-Marahoué
- Region: Marahoué
- Department: Sinfra

Area
  - Total: 786 km^{2} (303 sq mi)

Population (2021 census)
  - Total: 137,210
  - Density: 175/km^{2} (452/sq mi)
  - City: 80,658
- (2014 census)
- Time zone: UTC+0 (GMT)

Sinfra is a city in central Ivory Coast. It is a sub-prefecture and the seat of Sinfra Department in Marahoué Region, Sassandra-Marahoué District. Sinfra is also a commune.

In 2021, the population of the sub-prefecture of Sinfra was 137,210.

== Villages ==
The 26 villages of the sub-prefecture of Sinfra and their population in 2014 are:

1. Barakat (432)
2. Benhuafla (5 343)
3. Binoufla (1 377)
4. N'drikro (1 500)
5. Proziblanfla (1 094)
6. Sinfra (80 658)
7. Trikata (307)
8. Begouafla (1 038)
9. Broufla (678)
10. Djénédoufla (1 707)
11. Huafla (5 232)
12. Kouadiokro (2 100)
13. Kouadiotékro (1 083)
14. Koffibroukro (1 015)
15. Nadiéta (845)
16. N'gattakro (1 497)
17. Paabénéfla (678)
18. Porabénéfla (1 941)
19. Sanégourifla (4 685)
20. Tiézankro 2 (865)
21. Tiézankro 3 (4 173)
22. Yaokro (6 753)
23. Zéhouo (752)
24. Zéménafla-B (1 297)
25. Zéménafla-V (1 506)
26. Zougourouta (1 721)
