= Ilyas Chaira =

Moroccan footballer

Personal information
- Full name: Ilyas Chaira Oihi
- Date of birth: 2 February 2001 (age 25)
- Place of birth: Morocco
- Position: Winger

Team information
- Current team: Oviedo
- Number: 7

Youth career
- 2013–2015: Ripollès
- 2015–2020: Girona

Senior career*
Years	Team	Apps	(Gls)
2019	Girona B	3	(0)
2020–2025	Girona	0	(0)
2020–2021	→ Ibiza (loan)	8	(1)
2021–2022	→ Costa Brava (loan)	23	(2)
2022–2023	→ San Fernando (loan)	31	(11)
2023–2024	→ Mirandés (loan)	38	(5)
2024–2025	→ Oviedo (loan)	31	(7)
2025–	Oviedo	36	(6)

International career
2018	Morocco U18	2	(0)
- * Club domestic league appearances and goals as of 26 May 2026

Ilyas Chaira Oihi (born 2 February 2002) is a Moroccan footballer who plays as a right winger for Spanish club Real Oviedo.

== Club career ==
Born in Morocco, Chaira moved to Ripoll, Girona, Catalonia at the age of six with his parents and his brother. He started his career with local side EF Ripollès before joining Girona FC in 2015.

Chaira made his senior debut with the reserves at the age of 17 on 7 April 2019, playing the last 25 minutes of a 2–1 Primera Catalana home loss against CE Banyoles. On 9 September 2020, after finishing his formation, he was loaned to Segunda División B side UD Ibiza until the end of the season.

On 21 August 2021, after contributing with one goal in eight appearances as Ibiza achieved a first-ever promotion to Segunda División, Chaira moved to UE Costa Brava in Primera División RFEF also in a one-year loan deal. On 14 July of the following year, he joined fellow league team San Fernando CD also in a temporary deal.

On 6 July 2023, after scoring 11 goals for Sanfer, Chaira renewed his contract with Girona until 2026, and was loaned to second division side CD Mirandés for the campaign. He made his professional debut on 14 August, coming on as a second-half substitute for goalscorer Carlos Martín in a 4–0 home routing of AD Alcorcón.

On 24 August 2024, Chaira moved to fellow second division side Real Oviedo also on a one-year loan deal. On 11 July of the following year, after helping the side to achieve promotion to La Liga, his buyout clause was exercised, with the player signing a permanent three-year deal.
