= Santiago Colombatto =

Argentine footballer

Personal information
- Date of birth: 17 January 1997 (age 29)
- Place of birth: Córdoba, Argentina
- Height: 1.79 m (5 ft 10 1/2 in)
- Position: Midfielder

Team information
- Current team: León
- Number: 199

Youth career
- 2001–2006: Jorge Newbery
- 2007: River Plate
- 2008: Racing Club
- 2009–2015: River Plate

Senior career*
Years	Team	Apps	(Gls)
2016–2019	Cagliari	5	(0)
2016	→ Pisa (loan)	0	(0)
2016–2017	→ Trapani (loan)	14	(0)
2017–2018	→ Perugia (loan)	35	(1)
2018–2019	→ Verona (loan)	26	(1)
2019–2020	Sint-Truiden	30	(0)
2021	→ León (loan)	10	(1)
2021–	León	32	(3)
2022–2023	→ Famalicão (loan)	33	(3)
2023–2026	→ Oviedo (loan)	108	(7)

International career^{‡}
2017	Argentina U20	3	(0)
2019–2021	Argentina U23	15	(0)
Medal record
Representing Argentina
Men's football
Pan American Games
Gold medal – first place	2019 Lima	Team competition
- * Club domestic league appearances and goals as of 27 May 2026 ‡ National team caps and goals as of 28 July 2021

Santiago Colombatto (born 17 January 1997) is an Argentine professional footballer who plays as a midfielder for Liga MX club León.

== Club career ==
Colombatto arrived to Buenos Aires from his native Córdoba at age 10. In the Argentine capital, he played for River Plate and Racing Club before moving to Italian club Cagliari on a 3 1/2-year contract in December 2015. He made his Serie B debut on 13 February 2016 against Latina Calcio. He started in the first eleven and was replaced after 49 minutes by Davide Di Gennaro.

In July 2016 he was loaned to Pisa, but on 31 August 2016 he moved to Trapani on loan before the start of the season. On 7 August 2017 Colombatto joined Perugia on a temporary deal. On 16 August 2018, Colombatto joined on Serie B side Hellas Verona on loan with an option to buy.

On 31 August 2019, Colombatto joined Belgian club Sint-Truiden. On 8 Jan 2021, Colombatto joined Mexican side Club León.

On 2 August 2022, Colombatto was loaned by Famalicão in Portugal. On 25 August 2023, he moved to Real Oviedo of the Spanish Segunda División also on a one-year loan deal.

== Honours ==
León

- Leagues Cup: 2021
