= Bouaflé Department =

Coordinates: 6°59′N 5°45′W

Bouaflé Department Département de Bouaflé
- Department
- Location in Ivory Coast. Bouaflé Department has had these boundaries since 2020.
- Country: Ivory Coast
- District: Sassandra-Marahoué
- Region: Marahoué
- 1969: Established as a first-level subdivision
- 1980: Divided to create Zuénoula Dept
- 1988: Divided to create Sinfra Dept
- 1997: Converted to a second-level subdivision (creation of regions)
- 2011: Converted to a third-level subdivision (creacion of districts)
- 2014: Converted to a second-level subdivision (suppression of districts)
- 2020: Divided to create Bonon Dept
- 2021: Converted to a third-level subdivision (reinstatement of districts)
- Departmental seat: Bouaflé

Government
  - Prefect: Kouamé Adrien Gbamélé

Area
  - Total: 2,580 km^{2} (1,000 sq mi)

Population (2021 census)
  - Total: 300,305
  - Density: 116/km^{2} (301/sq mi)
- Time zone: UTC+0 (GMT)

Bouaflé Department is a department of Marahoué Region in Sassandra-Marahoué District, Ivory Coast. In 2021, its population was 300,305 and its seat is the settlement of Bouaflé. The sub-prefectures of the department are Bégbessou, Bouaflé, N'Douffoukankro, Pakouabo, and Tibéita.

== History ==
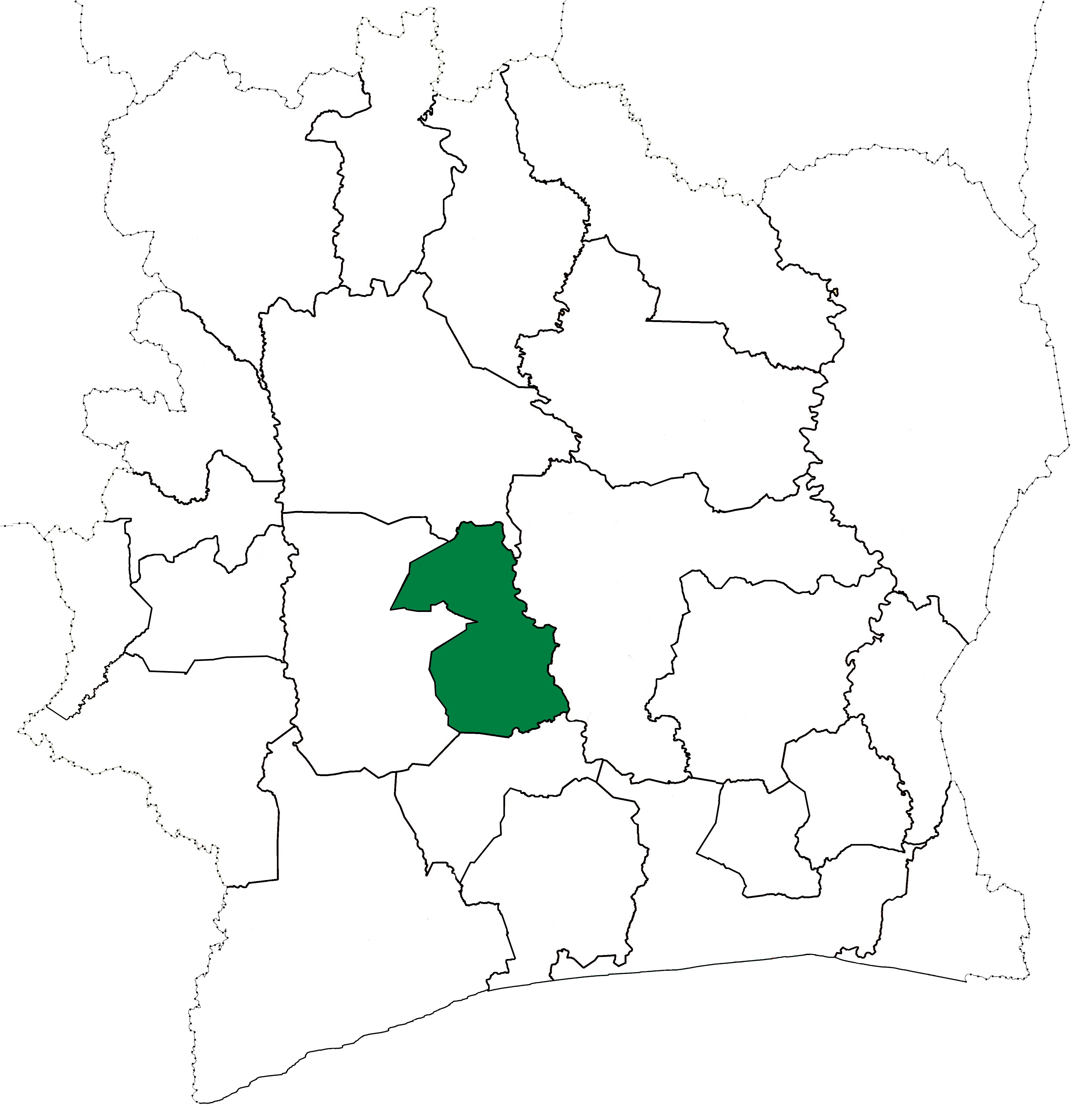
Bouaflé Department upon its creation in 1969. It kept these boundaries until 1980, but other departments began to be divided in 1974.

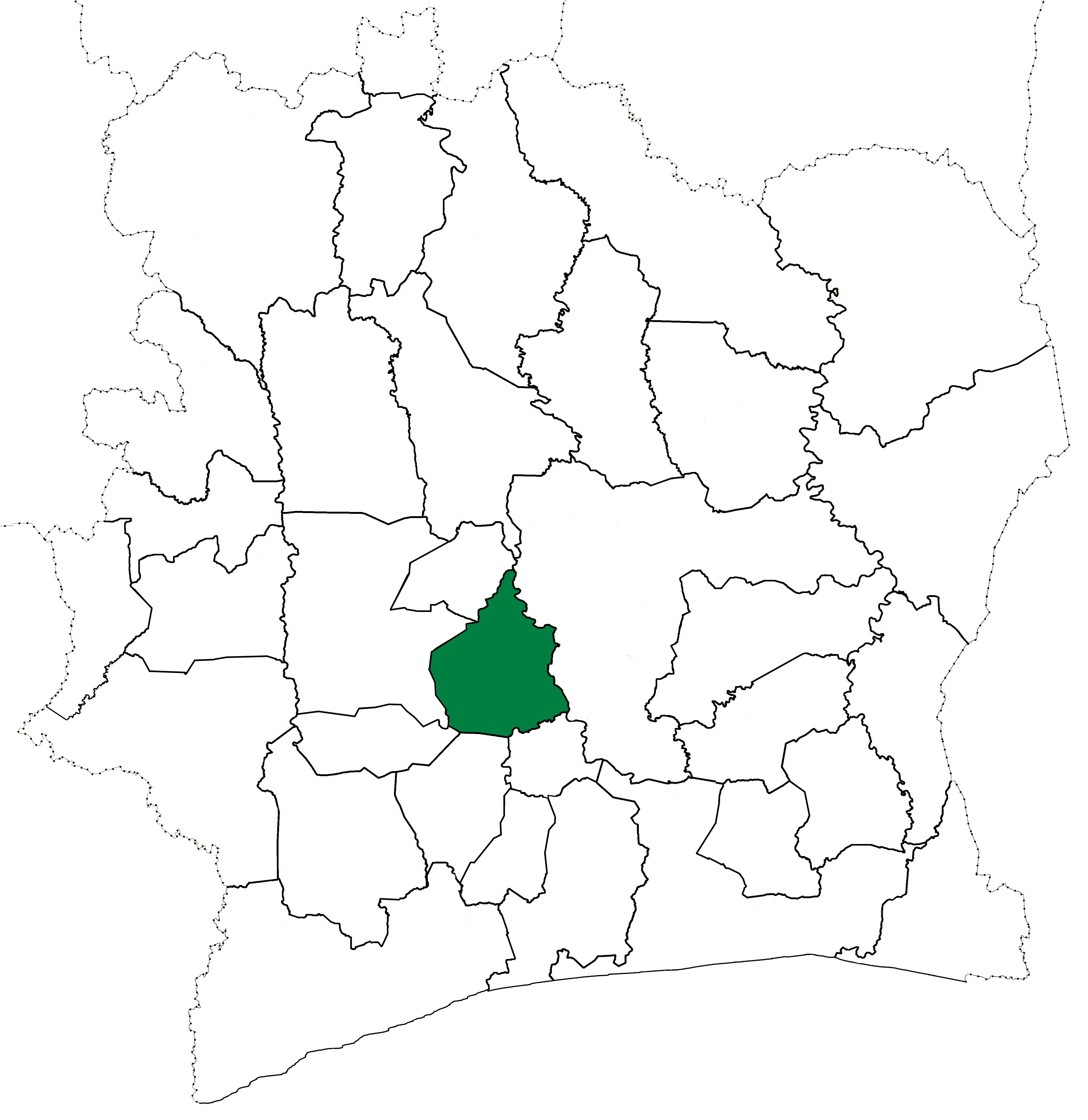
Bouaflé Department from 1980 to 1988.

Bouaflé Department was created in 1969 as one of the 24 new departments that were created to take the place of the six departments that were being abolished. It was created from territory that was formerly part of Centre Department. Using current boundaries as a reference, the department occupied the same territory that is today Marahoué Region.

In 1980, Bouaflé Department was divided to create Zuénoula Department. What remained was divided again in 1988 to create Sinfra Department.

In 1997, regions were introduced as new first-level subdivisions of Ivory Coast; as a result, all departments were converted into second-level subdivisions. Bouaflé Department was included as part of Marahoué Region.

In 2011, districts were introduced as new first-level subdivisions of Ivory Coast. At the same time, regions were reorganised and became second-level subdivisions and all departments were converted into third-level subdivisions. At this time, Bouaflé Department remained part of the retained Marahoué Region in the new Sassandra-Marahoué District.

In 2014, districts were suppressed - they were reinstated in 2021. In the meanwhile, in 2020, the department was divided again to create Bonon Department.
