= Zuénoula Department =

Coordinates: 7°26′N 6°3′W

Zuénoula Department Département de Zuénoula
- Department
- Location in Ivory Coast. Zuénoula Department has these boundaries since 2020.
- Country: Ivory Coast
- District: Sassandra-Marahoué
- Region: Marahoué
- 1980: Established as a first-level subdivision via a division of Bouaflé Dept
- 1997: Converted to a second-level subdivision
- 2011: Converted to a third-level subdivision
- 2020: Divided to create the Gohitafla Dept
- Departmental seat: Zuénoula

Government
  - Prefect: Basile Niamkey

Area
  - Total: 2,196 km^{2} (848 sq mi)

Population (2021 census)
  - Total: 184,882
  - Density: 84.19/km^{2} (218.1/sq mi)
- Time zone: UTC+0 (GMT)

Zuénoula Department is a department of Marahoué Region in Sassandra-Marahoué District, Ivory Coast. In 2021, its population was 184,882 and its seat is the settlement of Zuénoula. The sub-prefectures of the department are Iriéfla, Kanzra, Vouéboufla, and Zanzra.

== History ==
Zuénoula Department was created in 1980 as first-level subdivision via a split-off from Bouaflé Department. In 1991, regions were introduced as new first-level subdivisions of Ivory Coast; as a result, all departments were converted into second-level subdivisions. Zuénoula Department was included in Centre-Ouest Region. In 1996, this region was split in two and Zuénoula Department was transferred to the Bouaflé Region, renamed Marahoué Region in 1997.

In 2011, districts were introduced as new first-level subdivisions of Ivory Coast. At the same time, regions were reorganised and became second-level subdivisions and all departments were converted into third-level subdivisions. At this time, Zuénoula Department remained part of the retained Marahoué Region in the new Sassandra-Marahoué District.

In 2020, it was divided to create the Gohitafla Department.
