= Marahoué =

Coordinates: 7°10′N 5°50′W

Marahoué Region Région de la Marahoué
- Region
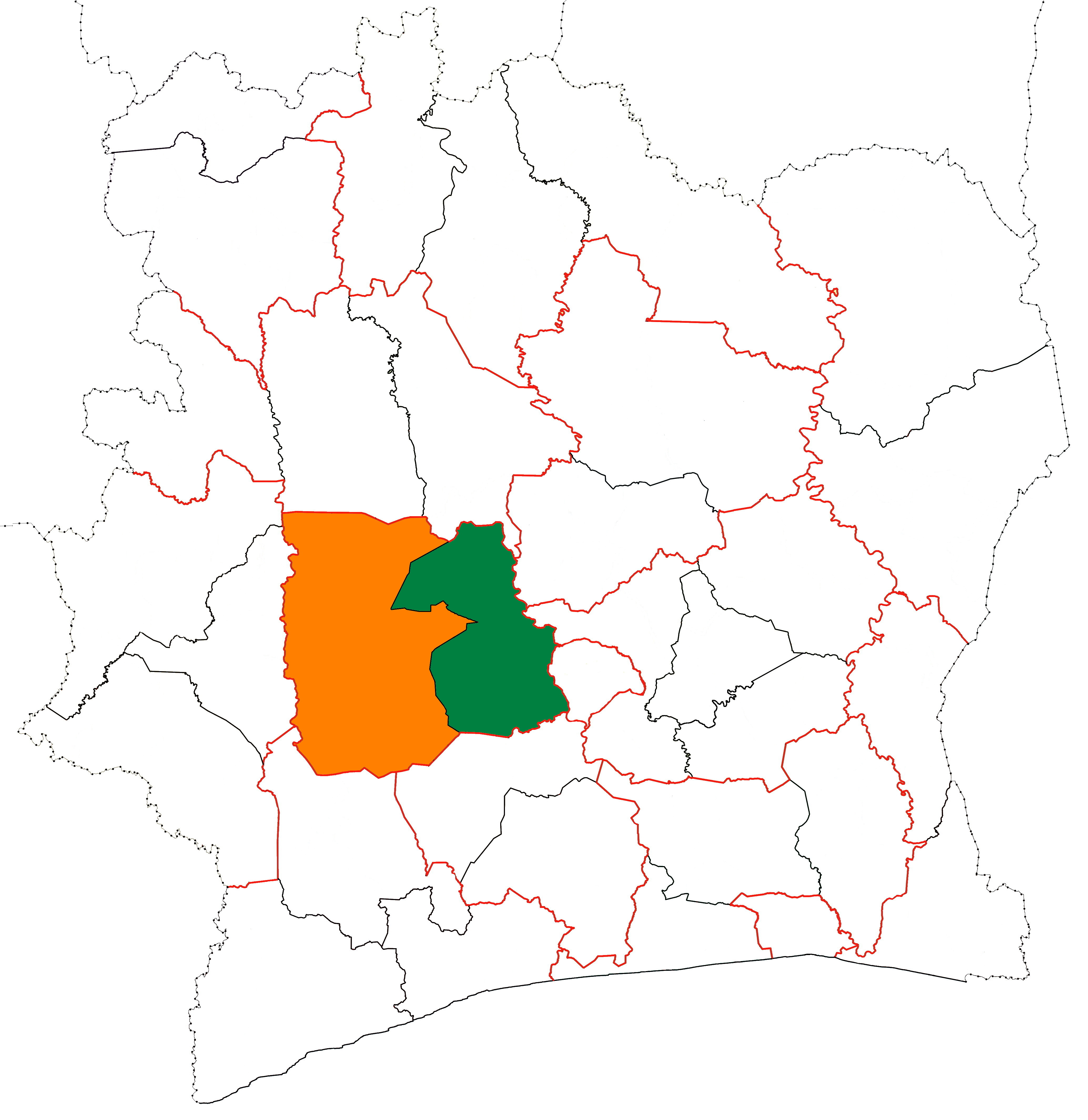
- Location of Marahoué Region (green) in Ivory Coast and in Sassandra-Marahoué District
- Country: Ivory Coast
- District: Sassandra-Marahoué
- 1997: Established as a first-level subdivision
- 2000: Divided to create Fromager Region
- 2011: Converted to a second-level subdivision
- Regional seat: Bouaflé

Government
  - Prefect: Kouamé Adrien Gbamélé
  - Council President: Richmond Abi Koffi

Area
  - Total: 8,680 km^{2} (3,350 sq mi)

Population (2021 census)
  - Total: 981,180
  - Density: 113/km^{2} (293/sq mi)
- Time zone: UTC+0 (GMT)

Marahoué Region is one of the 31 regions of Ivory Coast and is one of two regions in Sassandra-Marahoué District. The region's seat is Bouaflé. The region's area is 8,680 km^{2}, and its population in the 2021 census was 981,180.

== Departments ==
Marahoué Region is currently divided into five departments: Bonon, Bouaflé, Gohitafla, Sinfra, and Zuénoula.

== History ==
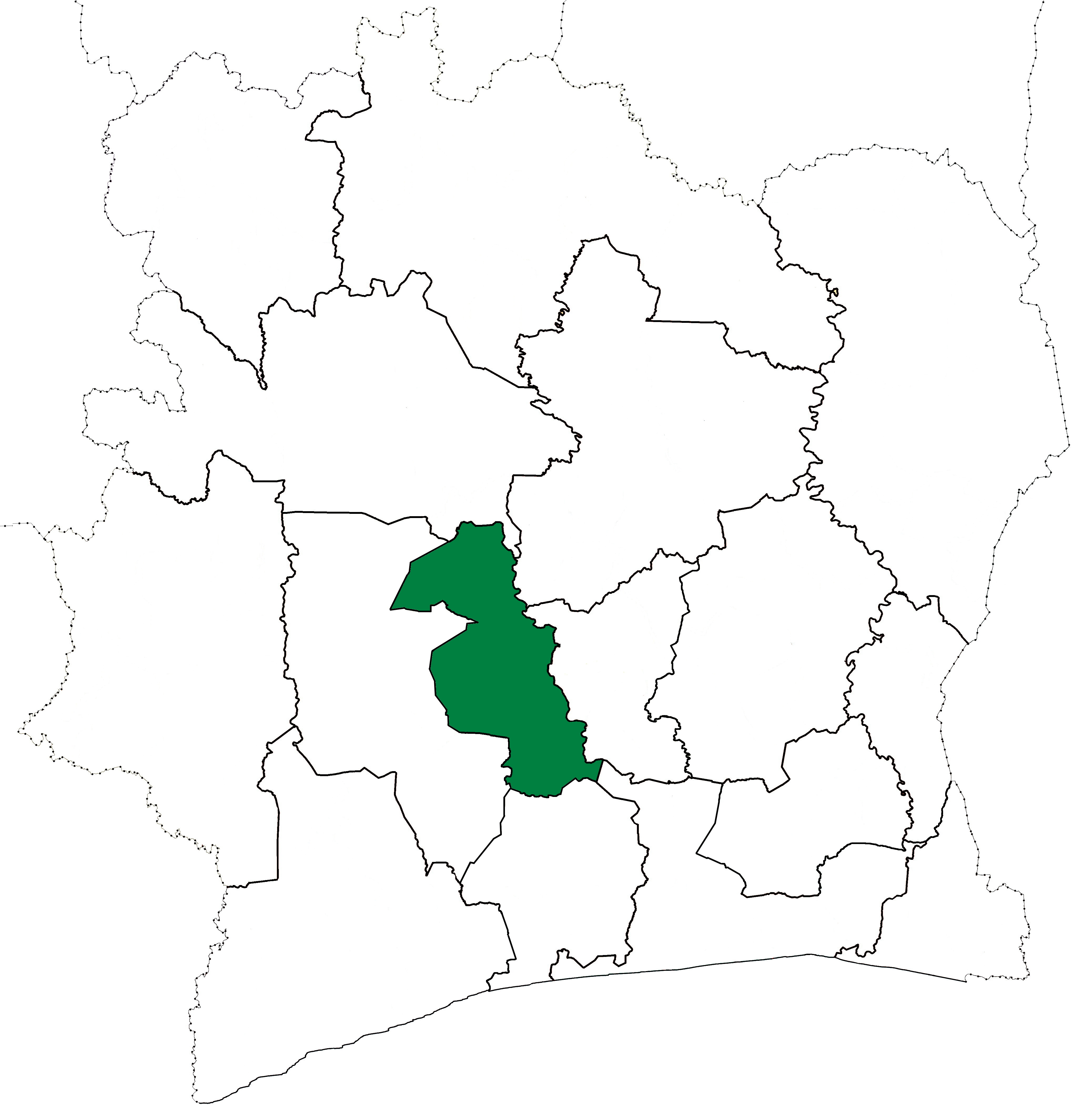
Marahoué Region upon its creation in 1997. Marahoué retained these boundaries until 2000, when it and Haut-Sassandra Region were divided to create Fromager Region.

Marahoué Region was created in 1997 as a first-level administrative region of the country. In 2000, Oumé Department was split off from Marahoué and combined with Gagnoa Department from Haut-Sassandra Region to form Fromager Region.

As part of the 2011 administrative reorganisation of the subdivisions of Ivory Coast, Marahoué was converted into a second-level administrative region and became part of the new first-level Sassandra-Marahoué District. No territorial changes were made to the region as a result of the reorganisation.
