= List of political parties in Ivory Coast =

This article lists political parties in Ivory Coast. Ivory Coast is a multiparty state.

The Democratic Party of Côte d'Ivoire (PDCI) was the sole legal party from 1960 to 1990. It would rule for another nine years until a 1999 coup. The Ivorian Popular Front (FPI) came to power after disputed elections in 2000, and would rule until it was ousted by the Rally of the Republicans in 2010. There are currently more than a hundred legal parties, though few have significant national support.

== Current parties ==
=== Parliamentary parties ===
Party	Abbr.	Leader	Political position	Ideology	Assembly
Rally of Houphouëtists for Democracy and Peace; Rassemblement des houphouëtistes pour la démocratie et la paix	RHDP	Alassane Ouattara	Centre	Houphouëtism; Liberalism	196 / 255
Democratic Party of Ivory Coast – African Democratic Rally; Parti démocratique de Côte d'Ivoire – Rassemblement démocratique africain	PDCI-RDA	Henri Konan Bédié	Centre-right	African nationalism; Conservatism; Populism; Houphouëtism; Pan-Africanism	32 / 255
Ivorian Popular Front; Front populaire ivoirien	FPI	Pascal Affi N'Guessan	Centre-left	Social democracy; Democratic socialism; Left-wing nationalism	1 / 255
Union for the Republic; Union pour la république	UNPR				1 / 255
Le Buffle – Victory for Development; Le buffle – la victoire pour le développement	Le Buffle				1 / 255

=== Former Rebel Parties ===
- Patriotic Movement of Ivory Coast (Mouvement patriotique de Côte d'Ivoire, MPCI)
- Ivorian Popular Movement of the Great West (Mouvement populaire ivoirien du Grand Ouest, MPIGO)
- Movement for Justice and Peace (Mouvement pour la justice et la paix, MJP)
- New Forces (les Forces Nouvelles de Côte d'Ivoire; FNCI or FN) Formed in December 2002 a coalition these three parties.

=== Smaller parties ===
- Alliance for a New Côte d'Ivoire (Alliance pour une Nouvelle Côte d'Ivoire, ANCI)
- Citizens' Democratic Union (Union démocratique citoyenne de Côte d'Ivoire, UDCY)
- Ecological Party (Parti Ecologique Ivoirien, PEI)
- Ivoirian Communist Party (Parti communiste ivoirien, PCI)
- Ivorian People's Party (le Parti du Peuple Ivoirien, lePDPI.org)
- Ivorian Workers' Party (Parti ivoirien des travailleurs, PIT)
- Liberal Force (Force liberale, FL)
- Movement for the Total Liberation of Côte d'Ivoire (Mouvement pour la libération totale de la Côte d'Ivoire, MLTCI)
- Movement of Future Forces (Mouvement des Forces de l'Avenir)
- Nationalist Party (Parti Nationaliste, PANA)
- Pan-African Congress of Youth and Patriots (Congrès Panafricain des Jeunes et des Patriotes, COJEP)
- Party for the Protection of the Environment (Parti pour la protection de l'environnement, PPE)
- Party for Progress and Socialism (Parti pour le progrès et le socialisme, PPS)
- Revolutionary Communist Party of Côte d'Ivoire (Parti communiste révolutionnaire de Côte d'Ivoire, PCRCI)
- Socialist Front for Independence and Liberty (Front socialiste pour l'indépendance et la liberté, FSIL)
- Socialist People's Union (Union socialiste du peuple, USP)
- The Renaissance (La Renaissance)
- Together for Democracy and Sovereignty (Ensemble pour la démocratie et la souveraineté, EDS)
- Union for Democracy and Peace in Côte d'Ivoire (Union pour la démocratie et la paix en Côte d’Ivoire, UDPCI)
- Union of Democrats of Côte d'Ivoire (Union des Démocrates de Côte d'Ivoire)
- Union of Social Democrats (Union des socio-démocrates, USD)

== See also ==
- Lists of political parties
