= Zaliohouan =

- Village
- Location in Ivory Coast
- Coordinates: 6°47′N 6°14′W
- Country: Ivory Coast
- District: Sassandra-Marahoué
- Region: Haut-Sassandra
- Department: Daloa
- Sub-prefecture: Gadouan

Population (2014 census)
  - Village: 20,867
- Time zone: UTC+0 (GMT)

Zaliohouan is a village in western Ivory Coast. It is in the sub-prefecture of Gadouan, Daloa Department, Haut-Sassandra Region, Sassandra-Marahoué District.

Zaliohouan was a commune until March 2012, when it became one of 1,126 communes nationwide that were abolished.
