= Gabia, Sassandra-Marahoué =

Gabia
- Village
- Location in Ivory Coast
- Coordinates: 6°25′N 6°23′W
- Country: Ivory Coast
- District: Sassandra-Marahoué
- Region: Haut-Sassandra
- Department: Issia
- Sub-prefecture: Saïoua
- Time zone: UTC+0 (GMT)

Gabia is a village in south-western Ivory Coast. It is in the sub-prefecture of Saïoua, Issia Department, Haut-Sassandra Region, Sassandra-Marahoué District.

Gabia was a commune until March 2012, when it became one of 1,126 communes nationwide that were abolished.
