= Zébra =

- Village
- Location in Ivory Coast
- Coordinates: 6°55′N 6°32′W
- Country: Ivory Coast
- District: Sassandra-Marahoué
- Region: Haut-Sassandra
- Department: Daloa
- Sub-prefecture: Gboguhé
- Time zone: UTC+0 (GMT)

Zébra is a village in Ivory Coast. It is in the sub-prefecture of Gboguhé, Daloa Department, Haut-Sassandra Region, Sassandra-Marahoué District.

Zébra was a commune until March 2012, when it became one of 1,126 communes nationwide that were abolished.
