= Zagoréta =

- Village
- Location in Ivory Coast
- Coordinates: 6°41′N 6°9′W
- Country: Ivory Coast
- District: Sassandra-Marahoué
- Region: Haut-Sassandra
- Department: Daloa
- Sub-prefecture: Gadouan
- Time zone: UTC+0 (GMT)

Zagoréta is a village in western Ivory Coast. It is in the sub-prefecture of Gadouan, Daloa Department, Haut-Sassandra Region, Sassandra-Marahoué District.

Until 2012, Zagoréta was in the commune of Zagoréta-Gadouan. In March 2012, Zagoréta-Gadouan became one of 1,126 communes nationwide that were abolished.
