= Tézié =

- Village
- Location in Ivory Coast
- Coordinates: 6°23′N 6°18′W
- Country: Ivory Coast
- District: Sassandra-Marahoué
- Region: Haut-Sassandra
- Department: Issia
- Sub-prefecture: Nahio
- Time zone: UTC+0 (GMT)

Tézié is a village in western Ivory Coast. It is in the sub-prefecture of Nahio, Issia Department, Haut-Sassandra Region, Sassandra-Marahoué District.

Tézié was a commune until March 2012, when it became one of 1,126 communes nationwide that were abolished.
