= Célestine Olibé Trazéré =

Ivorian politician

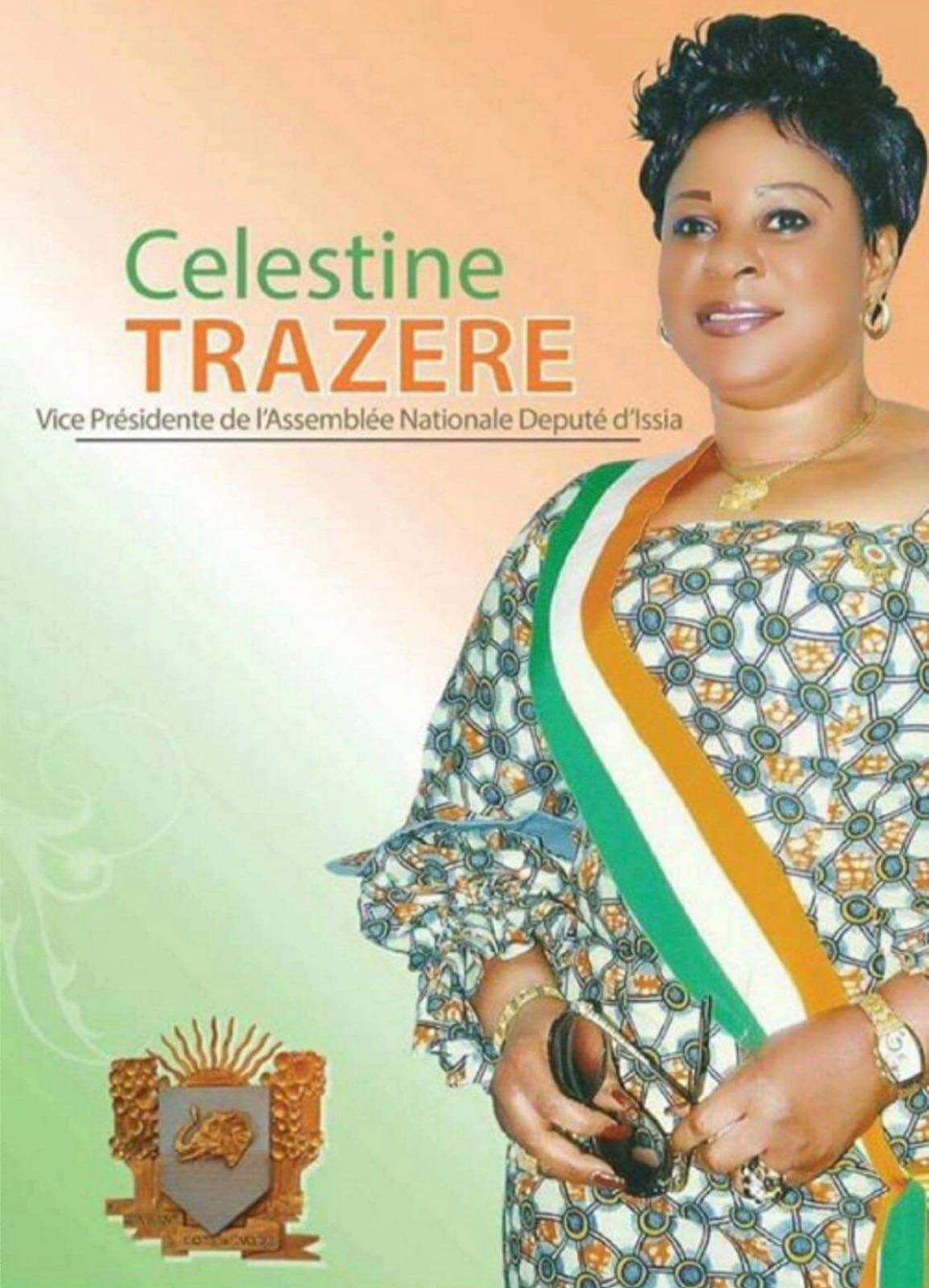
A campaign poster

Célestine Olibé Trazéré is an Ivorian politician who is a deputy of the National Assembly. Formerly president of the Rally of the Republicans, she joined the Rally of Houphouëtists for Democracy and Peace in 2020.

== Early life ==
Trazéré was born on 6 April 1967. She gained a Masters in Business at the University of Bouaké in 1996 and then taught for some years. She is married and has three children.

== Career ==
She became director of the National Agency for Urban Health (Anasur) in 2011. The same year, she was elected to the National Assembly to represent Issia as part of the Rally of the Republicans (RDR). She later became president of the RDR. During the COVID-19 pandemic she organised the distribution of protective equipment and hand sanitizer in Boguédia, Issia and Tapéguia. In February 2020, she rejoined the Rally of Houphouëtists for Democracy and Peace (RHDP).
