= Luénoufla =

- Village
- Location in Ivory Coast
- Coordinates: 7°4′N 6°15′W
- Country: Ivory Coast
- District: Sassandra-Marahoué
- Region: Haut-Sassandra
- Department: Daloa
- Sub-prefecture: Bédiala

Population (2014 census)
  - Village: 19,643
- Time zone: UTC+0 (GMT)

Luénoufla is a village in central Ivory Coast. It is in the sub-prefecture of Bédiala, Daloa Department, Haut-Sassandra Region, Sassandra-Marahoué District.

Luénoufla was a commune until March 2012, when it became one of 1,126 communes nationwide that were abolished.
