= Gboguhé =

- Town, sub-prefecture, and commune
- Location in Ivory Coast
- Coordinates: 6°45′N 6°35′W
- Country: Ivory Coast
- District: Sassandra-Marahoué
- Region: Haut-Sassandra
- Department: Daloa

Population (2014)
  - Total: 58,103
- Time zone: UTC+0 (GMT)

Gboguhé is a town in western Ivory Coast. It is a sub-prefecture and commune of Daloa Department in Haut-Sassandra Region, Sassandra-Marahoué District.

In 2014, the population of the sub-prefecture of Gboguhé was 58,103.

== Villages ==
The 36 villages of the sub-prefecture of Gboguhé and their population in 2014 are:

1. Baléa (1 425)
2. Brakaguhé (863)
3. Brohouan (1 053)
4. Gbieguhé (808)
5. Gboguhé (3 289)
6. Gokra (2 164)
7. Guédékipréa (680)
8. Guédiboua (1 331)
9. Kékégoza (1 452)
10. Koréa 2 (1 496)
11. Krikoréa 1 (1 223)
12. Krikoréa 2 (914)
13. Liguéguhé (1 080)
14. Ziguédia (1 223)
15. Zoboua (1 407)
16. Batéguédia 1 (1 062)
17. Batéguédia 2 (892)
18. B-Koukoguhé (4 032)
19. Bribouo (722)
20. Digbapia (2 775)
21. Doboua (1 557)
22. Gosséa (1 043)
23. Kéibla (2 558)
24. Kibouo (1 454)
25. Koréa 1 (828)
26. Kramoua (271)
27. Loboguiguia (1 907)
28. Noumousséria 1 (1 617)
29. Noumousséria 2 (1 819)
30. Noumousséria 3 (1 110)
31. Sébraguhé (773)
32. Yokoréa (2 839)
33. Zahia (4 143)
34. Zébra (3 780)
35. Zétodigba (682)
36. Zobéa (1 831)
