= Iboguhé =

- Town and sub-prefecture
- Location in Ivory Coast
- Coordinates: 6°33′N 6°51′W
- Country: Ivory Coast
- District: Sassandra-Marahoué
- Region: Haut-Sassandra
- Department: Issia

Population (2014)
  - Total: 41,768
- Time zone: UTC+0 (GMT)

Iboguhé is a town in western Ivory Coast. It is a sub-prefecture of Issia Department in Haut-Sassandra Region, Sassandra-Marahoué District.

Iboguhé was a commune until March 2012, when it became one of 1,126 communes nationwide that were abolished.

In 2014, the population of the sub-prefecture of Iboguhé was 41,768.

== Villages ==
The 13 villages of the sub-prefecture of Iboguhé and their population in 2014 are:

1. Aboka (12,055)
2. Bekié (1,244)
3. Beliéguhé (2,840)
4. Bokaréghué (2,415)
5. Dadeguhé (3,235)
6. Gueyeguhe (1,096)
7. Iboguhé (5,616)
8. Kelieguhe (1,195)
9. Keraoreguhé (1,644)
10. Nianabehi (1,373)
11. Séliéguhé (5,175)
12. Tapéguhé (2,855)
13. Zedeguhé (1,025)
