= Gonaté =

- Town and sub-prefecture
- Location in Ivory Coast
- Coordinates: 6°54′N 6°14′W
- Country: Ivory Coast
- District: Sassandra-Marahoué
- Region: Haut-Sassandra
- Department: Daloa

Area
  - Total: 158 km^{2} (61 sq mi)

Population (2021 census)
  - Total: 44,611
  - Density: 282/km^{2} (731/sq mi)
  - Town: 19,161
- (2014 census)
- Time zone: UTC+0 (GMT)

Gonaté is a town in west-central Ivory Coast. It is a sub-prefecture of Daloa Department in Haut-Sassandra Region, Sassandra-Marahoué District.

Gonaté was a commune until March 2012, when it became one of 1,126 communes nationwide that were abolished.

In 2021, the population of the sub-prefecture of Gonaté was 44,611.

== Villages ==
The six villages of the sub-prefecture of Gonaté and their population in 2014 are:

1. Bégafla (3,657)
2. Gonaté (19,161)
3. Gonaté Kouamekro (2,420)
4. Séifla (4,650)
5. Sétréfla (4,353)
6. Zéréfla (2,697)
