= Namané =

- Town and sub-prefecture
- Location in Ivory Coast
- Coordinates: 6°24′N 6°55′W
- Country: Ivory Coast
- District: Sassandra-Marahoué
- Region: Haut-Sassandra
- Department: Issia

Population (2014)
  - Total: 41,177
- Time zone: UTC+0 (GMT)

Namané is a town in west-central Ivory Coast. It is a sub-prefecture of Issia Department in Haut-Sassandra Region, Sassandra-Marahoué District.

Namané was a commune until March 2012, when it became one of 1,126 communes nationwide that were abolished.

In 2014, the population of the sub-prefecture of Namané was 41,177.

== Villages ==
The 10 villages of the sub-prefecture of Namané and their population in 2014 are:

1. Diassa (7,318)
2. Digbeuguhe (3,406)
3. Drékuha (2,513)
4. Kéréguhé (2,633)
5. Luéhouan 1 (1,427)
6. Luéhouan 2 (11,426)
7. Namané (6,221)
8. Sabreguhe (3,128)
9. Sédibia (2,003)
10. Tapéoua (1,102)
