= Nahio =

- Town and sub-prefecture
- Location in Ivory Coast
- Coordinates: 6°23′N 6°14′W
- Country: Ivory Coast
- District: Sassandra-Marahoué
- Region: Haut-Sassandra
- Department: Issia

Population (2014)
  - Total: 27,034
- Time zone: UTC+0 (GMT)

Nahio is a town in west-central Ivory Coast. It is a sub-prefecture of Issia Department in Haut-Sassandra Region, Sassandra-Marahoué District.

Nahio was a commune until March 2012, when it became one of 1,126 communes nationwide that were abolished.

In 2014, the population of the sub-prefecture of Nahio was 27,034.

== Villages ==
The seven villages of the sub-prefecture of Nahio and their population in 2014 are:

1. Bogbam (11,307)
2. Kridakozahio (1,273)
3. Nahio (3,271)
4. Nakiahio (1,771)
5. Takouahio (2,349)
6. Tézié (6,055)
7. Zézahio (1,008)
