= Zaïbo =

- Town and sub-prefecture
- Location in Ivory Coast
- Coordinates: 6°59′N 6°40′W
- Country: Ivory Coast
- District: Sassandra-Marahoué
- Region: Haut-Sassandra
- Department: Daloa

Population (2014)
  - Total: 38,502
- Time zone: UTC+0 (GMT)

Zaïbo is a town in west-central Ivory Coast. It is a sub-prefecture of Daloa Department in Haut-Sassandra Region, Sassandra-Marahoué District.

Zaïbo was a commune until March 2012, when it became one of 1,126 communes nationwide that were abolished.

In 2014, the population of the sub-prefecture of Zaïbo was 38,502.

== Villages ==
The three villages of the sub-prefecture of Zaïbo and their population in 2014 are:

1. Boboniessoko (21,237)
2. Gamina (3,837)
3. Zaïbo (13,428)
