= Digbapia =

- Village
- Location in Ivory Coast
- Coordinates: 6°50′N 6°38′W
- Country: Ivory Coast
- District: Sassandra-Marahoué
- Region: Haut-Sassandra
- Department: Zoukougbeu
- Sub-prefecture: Grégbeu
- Time zone: UTC+0 (GMT)

Digbapia is a village in western Ivory Coast. It is in the sub-prefecture of Grégbeu, Zoukougbeu Department, Haut-Sassandra Region, Sassandra-Marahoué District.

Digbapia was a commune until March 2012, when it became one of 1,126 communes nationwide that were abolished.
