= 2018–19 Serbian Cup =

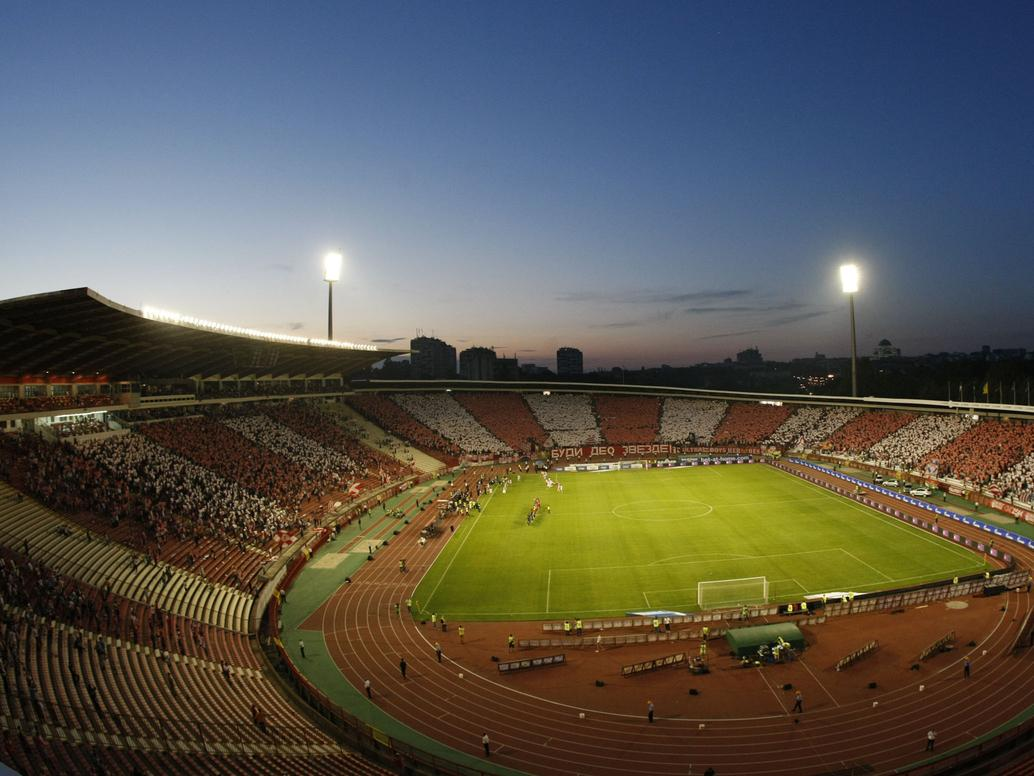
- Stadium Rajko Mitić hosted the final

Tournament details
- Country: Serbia
- Teams: 36

Final positions
- Champions: Partizan
- Runners-up: Red Star

Tournament statistics
- Matches played: 34
- Goals scored: 92 (2.71 per match)
- Top goal scorer(s): Dejan Joveljić; Marko Mitrović (3 each)

The 2018–19 Serbian Cup season was the thirteenth season of the Serbian national football cup competition. It started on 12 September 2018, and ended on 23 May 2019. Partizan were crowned the champions.

== Calendar ==
Round	Date(s)	Number of fixtures	Clubs	New entries this round
Preliminary round	12 September 2018	4	36 → 32	8
Round of 32	26 September and 17 October 2018	16	32 → 16	28
Round of 16	24 October, 14 November and 21 November 2018	8	16 → 8	none
Quarter-finals	13 March 2019	4	8 → 4	none
Semi-finals	17 April and 15 May 2019	4	4 → 2	none
Final	23 May 2019	1	2 → 1	none

== Preliminary round ==
12 September 2018	Mladost Bački Jarak	3–0	ČSK Čelarevo	Stadion FK Mladost, Bački Jarak
16:00 CEST	Kočiš 36'; S. Kovačević 59'; Papović 68'

12 September 2018	Trayal	0–1	Radnički Pirot	Stadion pod Bagdalom, Kruševac
16:00 CEST			Milošević 64'	Attendance: 500; Referee: Borko Mijailović

12 September 2018	Mokra Gora	0–0 (3–5 p)	Sloboda Užice	Mala Marakana, Zubin Potok
16:00 CEST				Attendance: 300; Referee: Dragan Čolović

12 September 2018	Kolubara	2–0	Temnić 1924	Stadion FK Kolubara, Lazarevac
16:00 CEST	Čadikovski 10'; Tadić 74'

== Round of 32 ==
26 September 2018	Kolubara	1–2	Partizan	Stadion FK Kolubara, Lazarevac
15:00 CEST	Matijević 76'		19' Nikolić; 49' Đerlek	Attendance: 2.500; Referee: Nenad Minaković

26 September 2018	Inđija	0–2	Zemun	City Stadium, Inđija
16:00 CEST			6' Cvetković; 34' Romanovskij	Attendance: 800; Referee: Miloš Milanović

26 September 2018	Proleter Novi Sad	1–1 (3–4 p)	Mladost Lučani	Slana Bara, Novi Sad
16:00 CEST	Jovanović 58'		37' Sinđić	Referee: Igor Stojilković

26 September 2018	TSC	2–0	Rad	City Stadium, Senta
16:00 CEST	Bastajić 35'; Milisavljević 90+2'			Referee: Stanko Ostraćanin

26 September 2018	Mladost Bački Jarak	0–2	Čukarički	Stadion FK Mladost, Bački Jarak
16:00 CEST			59' Vidosavljević; 63' Bojić	Attendance: 700; Referee: Marko Ivković

26 September 2018	LFK Mladost	0–2	Spartak Subotica	Mladost Stadium, Lučani
16:00 CEST			17', 89' Đenić	Referee: Andrija Stojanović

26 September 2018	Radnik Surdulica	5–0	Radnički Pirot	City Stadium, Surdulica
16:00 CEST	Bojić 23'; Pantelić 46'; M.Stojanović 59'; Kyeremeh 60'; Zlatanović 77'			Referee: Danilo Jerinić

26 September 2018	Sinđelić Beograd	1–0	Voždovac	Stadion FK Sinđelić, Belgrade
16:00 CEST	Petrović 41' (o.g.)			Referee: Lazar Lukić

26 September 2018	Javor	3–0	Novi Pazar	City Stadium, Ivanjica
16:00 CEST	Amani 69'; N.Marković 74'; Bajović 89'			Referee: Jovan Šegrt

26 September 2018	Sloboda Užice	0–3	Borac Čačak	City Stadium, Užice
18:00 CEST			54' Ilić; 80' Janjušević; 87' Tripković	Referee: Lazar Tripković

26 September 2018	OFK Bačka	1–1 (3–4 p)	Budućnost Dobanovci	Slavko Maletin Vava, Bačka Palanka
18:00 CEST	Čeković 80'		28' Kukolj	Referee: Marko Srećković

26 September 2018	Mačva	1–0	Radnički 1923	City Stadium, Šabac
18:00 CEST	Adamović 54'			Referee: Dragan Čolović

26 September 2018	Radnički Niš	4–1	Bežanija	Čair, Niš
19:00 CEST	Bondarenko 22'; Mitrović 73', 79', 88'		Tanko 63'	Attendance: 500; Referee: Novica Anđelovski

26 September 2018	Vojvodina	2–0	Teleoptik	Karađorđe, Novi Sad
19:00 CEST	Đurić 64'; Arsić 88'			Attendance: 500; Referee: Milan Ilić

17 October 2018	Dinamo Vranje	0–2	Red Star	Stadion Yumco, Vranje
14:00 CEST	Stevanović (red card) 85'		15' Stojiljković; 61' Joveljić	Attendance: 5,000; Referee: Novak Simović

17 October 2018	Napredak Kruševac	2–0	Metalac Gornji Milanovac	Stadion pod Bagdalom, Kruševac
15:00 CEST	Vulić 32' (pen.); Ivanović 90+1'			Attendance: 500; Referee: Jovan Šegrt

== Round of 16 ==
24 October 2018	Zemun	0–2	Partizan	Zemun Stadium, Belgrade
14:00 CEST			50' Marković; 88' Zakarić	Attendance: 3.000; Referee: Momčilo Marković

24 October 2018	Budućnost Dobanovci	1–4	Radnički Niš	Stadion FK Budućnost, Dobanovci
14:00 CEST	Stojković 10'		11' Damnjanović; 19', 37' Jovanović; 31' Mrkić	Attendance: 300; Referee: Petar Piper

24 October 2018	Spartak Subotica	1–0	Mačva	City Stadium, Subotica
14:00 CEST	Denković 57'			Attendance: 200; Referee: Novak Simović

24 October 2018	Vojvodina	4–0	Sinđelić Beograd	Karađorđe, Novi Sad
16:00 CEST	Milojević 50'; Đuričin 58'; Đurić 67'; Gojkov 76'			Attendance: 300; Referee: Bojan Nikolić

24 October 2018	Borac Čačak	0–4	Napredak Kruševac	City Stadium, Čačak
17:00 CEST			49', 79' N'Diaye; 74' Alivodić; 76' Vukanović	Attendance: 100; Referee: Miloš Đorđić

24 October 2018	Čukarički	1–4	Mladost Lučani	Čukarički Stadium, Belgrade
17:00 CEST	M. Stevanović 65'		8', 45+1' Pavlović; 66' Tumbasević; 86' Jovanović	Attendance: 100; Referee: Novica Anđelovski

14 November 2018	Javor	1–1 (4–5 p)	Radnik Surdulica	City Stadium, Ivanjica
14:00 CEST	Amani 28'		47' Ristović	Attendance: 350; Referee: Lazar Lukić
	Penalties
	Kuveljić (penalty scored); Marković (penalty scored); Milovanović (penalty scored); Dolmagić (penalty scored); Josović (penalty missed)		(penalty scored) Zlatanović; (penalty scored) Nikolić; (penalty scored) Stevanović; (penalty scored) Žarković; (penalty scored) Milovanović

21 November 2018	Red Star	4–1	TSC	Rajko Mitić, Belgrade
15:00 CEST	Simić 39', 72'; Stojiljković 50'; Joveljić 90'		51' (o.g.) Sumaila	Attendance: 2.500; Referee: Lazar Tripković

== Quarter-finals ==
13 March 2019	Spartak Subotica	1–2	Mladost Lučani	City Stadium, Subotica
14:00 CET	Šormaz 44'		(red card) 42' Milošević; 61' Bojović; 80' Pejović	Attendance: 200; Referee: Srđan Jovanović

13 March 2019	Napredak Kruševac	0–4	Partizan	Stadion pod Bagdalom, Kruševac
15:30 CET			31' Zakarić; 45+2' Pantić; 66' Valiente; 72' Gomes	Attendance: 5.000; Referee: Zoran Široki

13 March 2019	Radnički Niš	2–1	Vojvodina	Čair, Niš
17:00 CET	Haskić 40' (pen.), 62'		90+4' Đuričin	Referee: Petar Piper

13 March 2019	Red Star	2–1	Radnik Surdulica	Rajko Mitić, Belgrade
18:00 CET	Ivanić 17'; Ben 44'		91' (pen.) Zlatanović

== Semi-finals ==
=== First legs ===
17 April 2019	Partizan	1–0	Radnički Niš	Partizan Stadium, Belgrade
18:00	Gomes 28'

16 April 2019	Red Star	4–1	Mladost Lučani	Rajko Mitić, Belgrade
17:00	Joveljić 12'; Milunović 57'; Pavkov 60'; Ivanić 68'		Dimić 53'	Attendance: 3,183; Referee: Bojan Nikolić

=== Second legs ===
15 May 2019	Radnički Niš	1–1 (1–2 agg.)	Partizan	Čair, Niš
20:00	Stojanović 75'	Report	Tošić 80'	Attendance: 7,000; Referee: Lazar Lukić

15 May 2019	Mladost Lučani	0–0 (1–4 agg.)	Red Star	Mladost Stadium, Lučani
17:30		Report		Attendance: 3,000; Referee: Petar Piper

== Final ==
23 May 2019	Red Star	0–1	Partizan	Rajko Mitić Stadium, Belgrade
20:00 EEST		Report	14' Ostojić	Attendance: 20,000; Referee: Novak Simović

== Top scorers ==
Rank	Player	Club	Goals
1	(Serbia) Dejan Joveljić	Red Star	3
1	(Sweden) Marko Mitrović	Radnički Niš	3
2	(Ivory Coast) Herve Bostan Amani	Javor	2
2	(Serbia) Dejan Đenić	Spartak Subotica	2
2	(Serbia) Milan Đurić	Vojvodina	2
2	(Serbia) Ognjen Đuričin	Vojvodina	2
2	(Cape Verde) Ricardo Gomes	Partizan	2
2	(Bosnia and Herzegovina) Nermin Haskić	Radnički Niš	2
2	(Montenegro) Mirko Ivanić	Red Star	2
2	(Serbia) Aleksandar Jovanović	Radnički Niš	2
2	(Senegal) Ibrahima N'Diaye	Napredak	2
2	(Serbia) Predrag Pavlović	Mladost Lučani	2
2	(Serbia) Veljko Simić	Red Star	2
2	(Serbia) Nikola Stojiljković	Red Star	2
2	(Bosnia and Herzegovina) Goran Zakarić	Partizan	2
2	(Serbia) Igor Zlatanović	Radnik Surdulica	2
