= Gadouan =

- Town and sub-prefecture
- Location in Ivory Coast
- Coordinates: 6°39′N 6°10′W
- Country: Ivory Coast
- District: Sassandra-Marahoué
- Region: Haut-Sassandra
- Department: Daloa

Population (2014)
  - Total: 57,470
- Time zone: UTC+0 (GMT)

Gadouan is a town in west-central Ivory Coast. It is a sub-prefecture of Daloa Department in Haut-Sassandra Region, Sassandra-Marahoué District.

Gadouan was a commune until March 2012, when it became one of 1,126 communes nationwide that were abolished.

In 2014, the population of the sub-prefecture of Gadouan was 57,470.

== Villages ==
The seven villages of the sub-prefecture of Gadouan and their population in 2014 are:

1. Bébouo-Sibouo (4,084)
2. Bidiahouan (4,771)
3. Gadouan (12,821)
4. Kribléguhé-Kpamizon (2,504)
5. Niamayo (2,622)
6. Zagoréta (9,801)
7. Zaliohouan (20,867)
