= Issia =

- Town, sub-prefecture, and commune
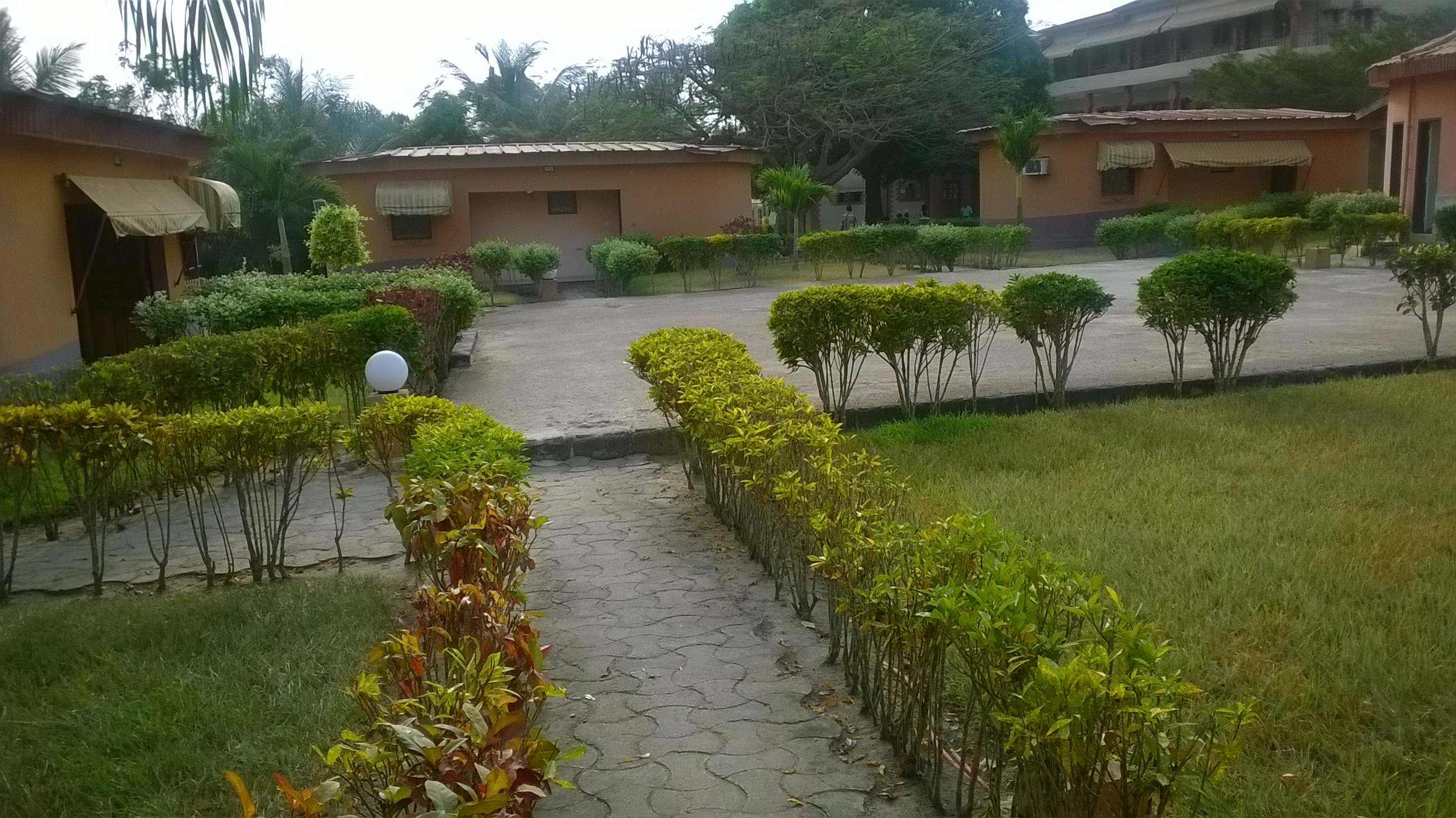
- Hôtel le Versant, Issia

- Location in Ivory Coast
- Coordinates: 6°29′N 6°35′W
- Country: Ivory Coast
- District: Sassandra-Marahoué
- Region: Haut-Sassandra
- Department: Issia

Area
  - Total: 561 km^{2} (217 sq mi)

Population (2021 census)
  - Total: 126,252
  - Density: 225/km^{2} (583/sq mi)
  - Town: 52,660
- (2014 census)
- Time zone: UTC+0 (GMT)

Issia is a town in western Ivory Coast. It is a sub-prefecture of and the seat of Issia Department in Haut-Sassandra Region, Sassandra-Marahoué District. Issia is also a commune.

In 2021, the population of the sub-prefecture of Issia was 126,252.

== Villages ==
The 32 villages of the sub-prefecture of Issia and their population in 2014 are:

1. Batrouan (503)
2. Bazaga (453)
3. Béréguhé-Brahouan (683)
4. Bobréguhé (1 145)
5. Dépa (811)
6. Gapoloroguhé (475)
7. Gbétigogoua (1 039)
8. Goda (1 130)
9. Guéguhé (100)
10. Issia (52 660)
11. Koredidia (566)
12. Ouandia (736)
13. Pézoan (2 108)
14. Zéréguhé (857)
15. Zobia (711)
16. Bémadi (2 117)
17. Bésséréguhé (558)
18. Bitapia (1 514)
19. Bolia (817)
20. Borotapia (1 253)
21. Brokoua (3 410)
22. Dohouan (400)
23. Dobia (593)
24. Gogouaguhé (608)
25. Guibouo (1 410)
26. Irogogoua (1 861)
27. Korékipra (948)
28. Laboua (976)
29. Louria (2 400)
30. Nioboguhé (1 610)
31. Tassouroubouo (556)
32. Tétia (719)
