= BLA =

BLA or bla may refer to:

== Organizations ==
- British Liberation Army, an historic British Army force in World War II
- Balochistan Liberation Army, a Baloch militant organization operating to gain independence from Pakistan
- Bavarian Liberation Army, a purported Austrian militant organization
- Black Liberation Army, a Black Power revolutionary organization in the United States
- British Laryngological Association, a professional organization

== Places and businesses ==
=== Education ===
- Biblioteca Las Américas, a library in Mercedes, Texas, U.S.
- Boston Latin Academy, a high school in Boston, Massachusetts, U.S.

=== Transportation ===
- General José Antonio Anzoátegui International Airport, Barcelona, Venezuela, by IATA code
- Blue Air, ICAO airline designator code
- Baltimore and Annapolis Railroad's reporting mark
- Blok A MRT station, a rapid transit station in Jakarta, Indonesia

=== Geographical locations ===
- Brainerd Lakes Area in Minnesota, U.S.
- Bla, Ivory Coast, a village in Sassandra-Marahoué District, Ivory Coast
- Bla, Mali, a town
- Blå, a jazz club in Oslo, Norway

== Other uses ==
- Biologics license application, which is submitted to the U.S. Food and Drug Administration for approval
- Bachelor of Liberal Arts, an undergraduate university degree
- Basolateral amygdala, a structure in the brain
- Siksika language of the Blackfoot native Americans (ISO 639 language code)

== See also ==
- Blah (disambiguation)
- Blaa, a doughy, white bread bun particular to Waterford City and County, Ireland
