= Tapéguia =

Tapéguia Betia
- Town and sub-prefecture
- Location in Ivory Coast
- Coordinates: 6°23′N 6°31′W
- Country: Ivory Coast
- District: Sassandra-Marahoué
- Region: Haut-Sassandra
- Department: Issia

Population (2014)
  - Total: 24,829
- Time zone: UTC+0 (GMT)

Tapéguia (also known as Betia) is a town in west-central Ivory Coast. It is a sub-prefecture of Issia Department in Haut-Sassandra Region, Sassandra-Marahoué District.

Tapéguia was a commune until March 2012, when it became one of 1,126 communes nationwide that were abolished.

In 2014, the population of the sub-prefecture of Tapéguia was 24,829.

== Villages ==
The 10 villages of the sub-prefecture of Tapéguia and their population in 2014 are:

1. Balahio (4,407)
2. Béhibouo (1,208)
3. Dalia (2,352)
4. Gahononguhé (230)
5. Gazibouo (3,119)
6. Golihoa (3,344)
7. Maboguhé (2,128)
8. Madia (2,063)
9. Tapéguia (2,459)
10. Zakroguhé (3,519)
