= Hamed Modibo Diallo =

Ivorian footballer (born 1976)

Hamed Diallo
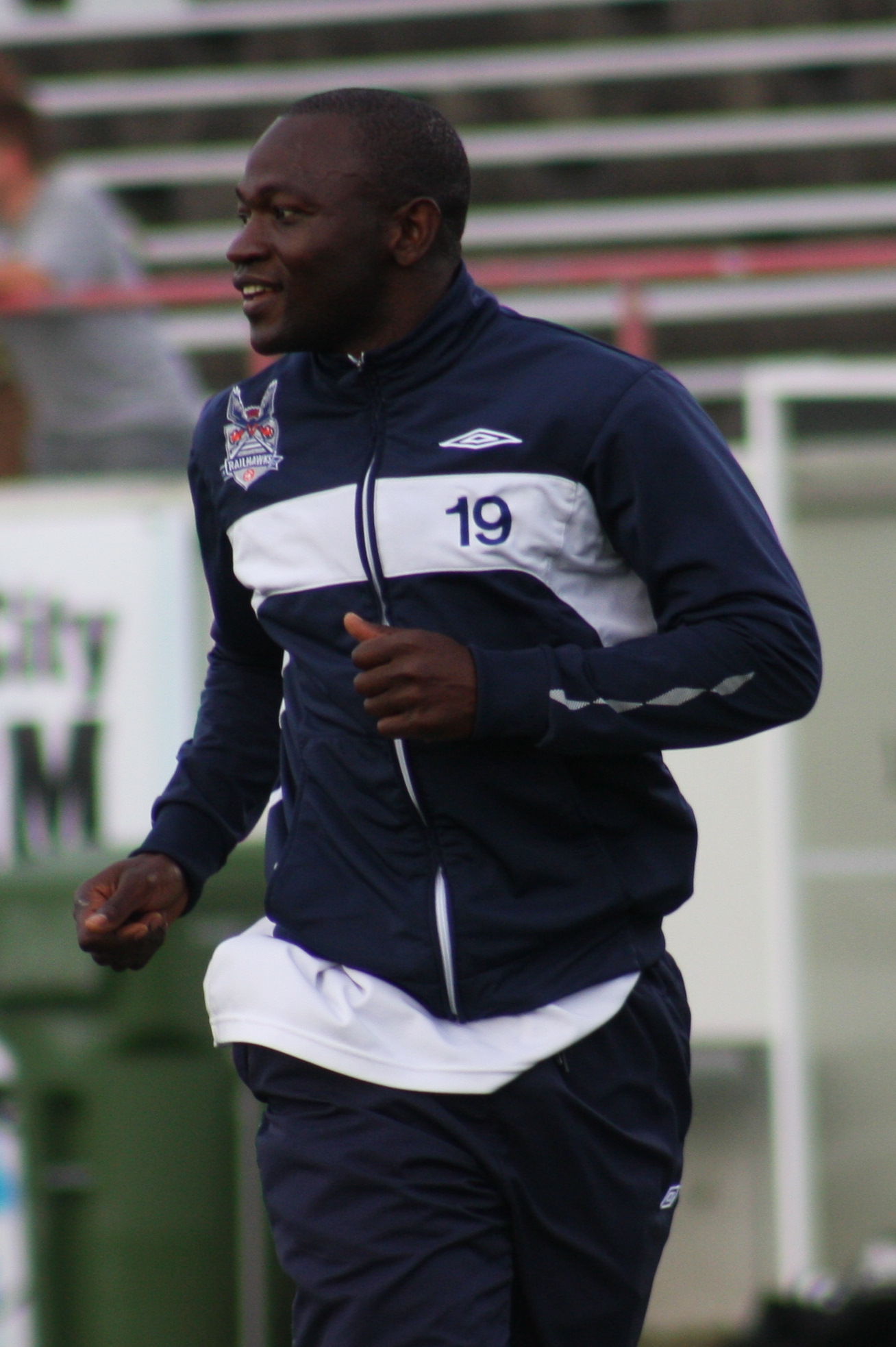
- Diallo in 2009

Personal information
- Full name: Hamed Modibo Diallo
- Date of birth: December 18, 1976 (age 49)
- Place of birth: Zahia, Ivory Coast
- Height: 5 ft 9 in (1.75 m)
- Position: Forward

Youth career
- 1994–1996: Le Havre

Senior career*
Years	Team	Apps	(Gls)
1996–2001	Le Havre	66	(14)
1998–1999	→ Laval (loan)	36	(20)
2000–2001	→ Laval (loan)	12	(2)
2001–2002	Amiens	66	(26)
2002–2003	Al-Rayyan		
2003–2004	Angers	16	(2)
2004–2005	Hammarby		
2005–2006	Turris	18	(13)
2007	Excelsior Virton	4	(1)
2007–2008	Rochester Rhinos	22	(9)
2008–2009	Carolina RailHawks	26	(7)
2010	Real Maryland Monarchs	4	(0)

International career
1999–2003	Ivory Coast	12	(7)
- * Club domestic league appearances and goals

Hamed Modibo Diallo (born December 18, 1976) is an Ivorian former professional footballer who played as a forward.

== Club career ==
Born in Zahia, Ivory Coast, Diallo began his career in France, initially in the youth academy of Le Havre, and later playing for Laval, Amiens, Angers, as well as with Al Rayyan in Qatar, Hammarby in Sweden, Turris in Italy, and Excelsior Virton in Belgium. He was the top scorer in the French Ligue 2 twice: in 1999 with Laval, and in 2002 with Amiens. He acquired French nationality by naturalization on 22 July 1999.

Diallo came to the United States in 2007 to play for Rochester Raging Rhinos in the USL First Division. During the 2007 season with Rochester, Diallo was a regular starter up front along with English-born striker Matthew Delicate; however, during 2008 Diallo gradually became a less frequent member of new coach Darren Tilley's squad, and had only eventually logged 474 minutes of playing time in 13 USL matches during the 2008 season.

On July 9, 2008, Diallo was transferred to Carolina RailHawks in return for Jamil Walker. Diallo produced a top-notch season with RailHawks in his debut season, where he recorded a hat-trick against the Seattle Sounders despite losing the match on a score of 4–3. He finished off the season by scoring seven goals and registering three assists in 16 games to finish with a team-leading 17 points. Despite a promising debut season, Diallo unfortunately failed to regain his previous form that dominated the 2008 season; which led to limited playing time during the 2009 season. On March 8, 2010, the Real Maryland Monarchs announced the signing of Diallo to a contract for the 2010 season.

== International career ==
Diallo played for the Ivory national team at the 2000 African Cup of Nations.

== Honours ==
- Ligue 2 top scorer: 1999 with 20 goals, 2002 with 18 goals
