= Grégbeu =

- Town and sub-prefecture
- Location in Ivory Coast
- Coordinates: 6°48′N 6°43′W
- Country: Ivory Coast
- District: Sassandra-Marahoué
- Region: Haut-Sassandra
- Department: Zoukougbeu

Population (2014)
  - Total: 18,475
- Time zone: UTC+0 (GMT)

Grégbeu is a town in west-central Ivory Coast. It is a sub-prefecture of Zoukougbeu Department in Haut-Sassandra Region, Sassandra-Marahoué District.

Grégbeu was a commune until March 2012, when it became one of 1,126 communes nationwide that were abolished.

In 2014, the population of the sub-prefecture of Grégbeu was 18,487.

== Villages ==
The nine villages of the sub-prefecture of Grégbeu and their population in 2014 are:

1. Bahigbeu 1 (824)
2. Bahigbeu 2 (1,090)
3. Dahirougbeu (420)
4. Dèdègbeu (2,332)
5. Grègbeu (6,469)
6. Guéguigbeu 1 (1,737)
7. Guéguigbeu 2 (1,274)
8. Liabo (2,703)
9. Zoukpangbeu (1,638)
