= 2000–01 Ivorian parliamentary election =

- 10 December 2000 and 14 January 2001
- All 225 seats in the National Assembly; 113 seats needed for a majority
- Turnout: 31.54%
| Party | Leader | Seats | +/– |
|---|---|---|---|
| FPI | Pascal Affi N'Guessan | 96 | +84 |
| PDCI–RDA | Henri Konan Bédié | 94 | −54 |
| RDR | Alassane Ouattara | 5 | −9 |
| PIT | Francis Wodié | 4 | +4 |
| UDCI | Théodore Mel | 1 | New |
| MFA | Innocent Anaky | 1 | New |
| Independents | – | 22 | +20 |
This lists parties that won seats. See the complete results below.
| Prime Minister before | Prime Minister after |
|---|---|
| Pascal Affi N'Guessan; FPI | Pascal Affi N'Guessan; FPI |

Parliamentary elections were held in Ivory Coast on 10 December 2000. In 28 seats in the north of the country voting was postponed due to unrest relating to the boycott by the Rally of the Republicans. Although the RDR continued to call for a boycott, 26 seats were eventually elected on 14 January 2001, although turnout was only 13 percent and the two seats for Kong were left vacant.

The result was a victory for the Ivorian Popular Front, which won 96 of the 225 seats in the National Assembly (increased from 175 seats in the previous election). Voter turnout in the first round of voting was just 34 percent, and overall was just 32 percent.

== Results ==
| Party | Votes | % | Seats | +/– |
|---|---|---|---|---|
| Ivorian Popular Front | | | 96 | +84 |
| Democratic Party of Ivory Coast | | | 94 | –54 |
| Rally of the Republicans | | | 5 | –9 |
| Ivorian Workers' Party | | | 4 | New |
| Union of Democrats of Ivory Coast | | | 1 | New |
| Movement of the Forces of the Future | | | 1 | New |
| Independents | | | 22 | New |
| Vacant | | | 2 | – |
| Total | | | 225 | +50 |
| Valid votes | 1,547,798 | 88.94 | | |
| Invalid/blank votes | 192,442 | 11.06 | | |
| Total votes | 1,740,240 | 100.00 | | |
| Registered voters/turnout | 5,517,593 | 31.54 | | |
Source: African Elections Database

== See also ==
- Ivorian Civil War
