= Guessabo =

- Town and sub-prefecture
- Location in Ivory Coast
- Coordinates: 6°44′N 6°57′W
- Country: Ivory Coast
- District: Sassandra-Marahoué
- Region: Haut-Sassandra
- Department: Zoukougbeu

Population (2014)
  - Total: 36,302
- Time zone: UTC+0 (GMT)

Guessabo is a town in west-central Ivory Coast. It is a sub-prefecture of Zoukougbeu Department in Haut-Sassandra Region, Sassandra-Marahoué District. It is three kilometres east of the border of Montagnes District.

Guessabo was a commune until March 2012, when it became one of 1,126 communes nationwide that were abolished.

In 2014, the population of the sub-prefecture of Guessabo was 36,302.

== Villages ==
The 11 villages of the sub-prefecture of Guessabo and their population in 2014 are:

1. Bassaraguhe (2,378)
2. Débo 1 (1,437)
3. Débo 2 (1,662)
4. Detroya (2,224)
5. Diléya (2,751)
6. Gorodi (3,537)
7. Guessabo (13,843)
8. Guétuzon 1 (2,897)
9. Guétuzon 2 (482)
10. Ouatigbeu (3,250)
11. Zitta (1,841)
