= Fadika Sarra Sako =

Ivorian politician

Fadika Sarra Sako is an Ivorian politician. She studied at the Kybourg School in Geneva, Switzerland. Between 2011 and 2016, Sako was a member of parliament for the Rally of the Republicans. She was elected as Vice-President of the National Assembly in 2012 and held the position until 2016. In addition to working as a politician, in 2004, she founded a non-governmental organization aimed at alleviating poverty in the Bafing Region. She holds the National Order of the Ivory Coast.
