= 2010 Ivorian presidential election =

- 31 October 2010 (first round); 28 November 2010 (second round)
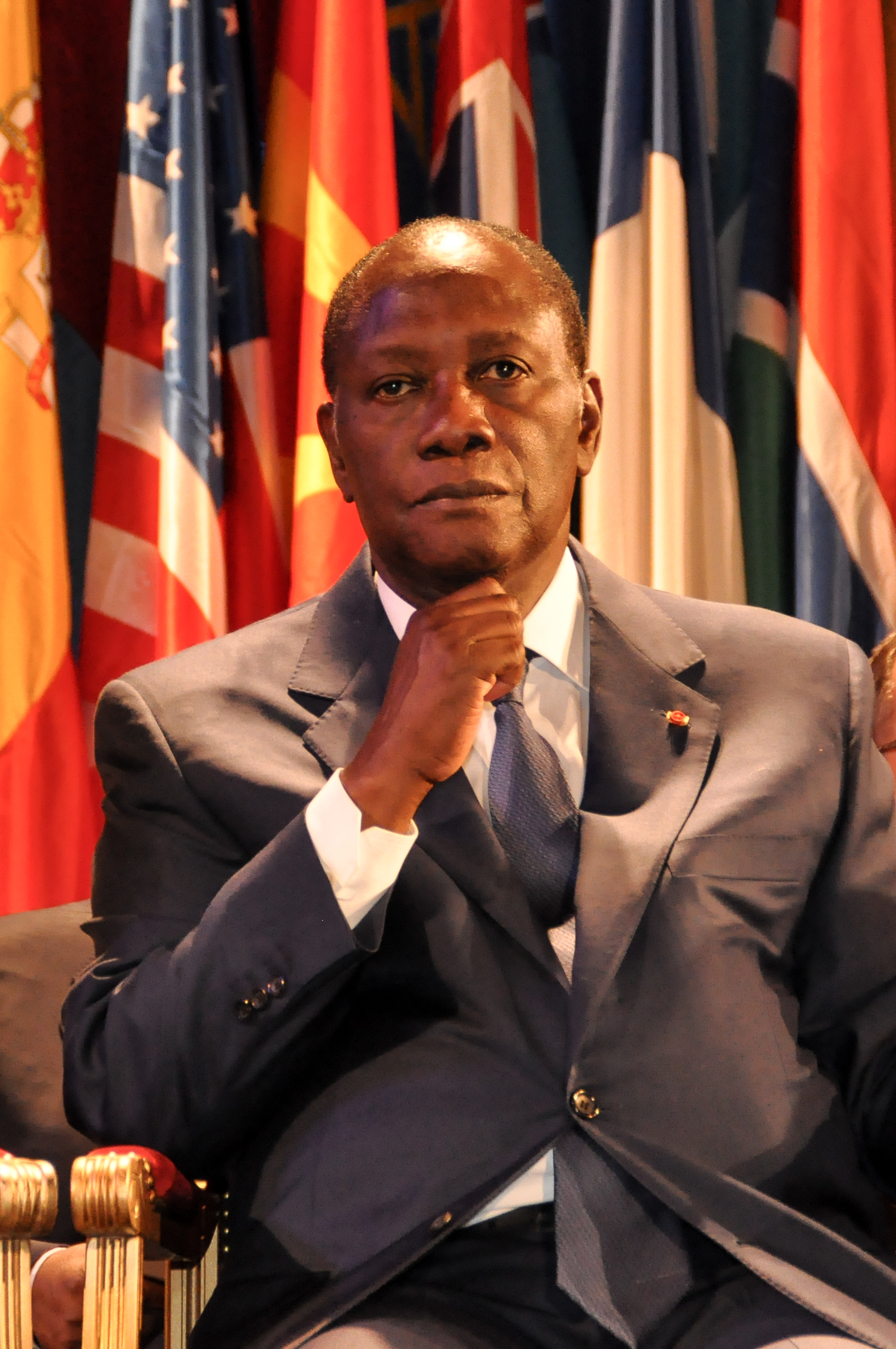

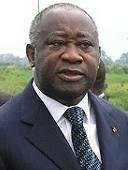
Nominee	Alassane Ouattara	Laurent Gbagbo
Party	RDR	FPI
Popular vote	1,938,672 (CC); 2,483,164 (IEC)	2,054,537 (CC); 2,107,055 (IEC)
Percentage	48.55% (CC); 54.1% (IEC)	51.45% (CC); 45.9% (IEC)
President before election
Laurent Gbagbo
FPI
Elected President
Contested, eventually
Alassane Ouattara
RDR

Presidential elections were held in Ivory Coast in 2010. The first round was held on 31 October, and a second round, in which President Laurent Gbagbo faced opposition leader Alassane Ouattara, was held on 28 November 2010. Originally scheduled to be held in 2005, the vote was delayed several times due to the Ivorian Civil War and difficulties involved in the organization and preparation of the elections. A peace agreement between the government and the former rebel New Forces was signed on 4 March 2007, and in late April 2009, it was announced that the elections would be held by 6 December 2009, and that the date would be announced shortly. On 15 May 2009, the date was announced to be 29 November 2009. On 11 November, the elections were postponed again due to delays in the electoral roll. It was announced on 3 December 2009 to be held in late February or early March 2010.

The elections, in which ethnicity and the country's north–south divide played a crucial role, ultimately pitted President Gbagbo, who had a strong support base in the south, against the long-time opposition leader and former Prime Minister Ouattara, who had overwhelming support in much of the north. The events leading up to the second round and following it were characterized by serious tension and some incidents of violence, and the preliminary report of the Carter Center "cautions against a rush to judgment regarding the overall credibility of the election", but most observers considered that the overall result was not compromised, and that the elections were essentially free and fair. On 2 December 2010, the Independent Electoral Commission (IEC) released provisional results showing that Ouattara had won the elections in the second round with 54% of the vote. However, the President of the Constitutional Council (CC) immediately declared that the results were invalid and the next day, in accordance with article 94 of the Constitution, the Constitutional Council declared Gbagbo the winner. Both Gbagbo and Ouattara claimed victory and took the presidential oath of office. The ensuing events led to the 2010–2011 Ivorian crisis.

The international community, including the United Nations, the African Union, the Economic Community of West African States (ECOWAS), the European Union, the United States, and former colonial power France have affirmed their support for Ouattara, who is "almost universally acknowledged to have defeated [Gbagbo] at the ballot box," and have called for Gbagbo to step down, despite the fact that the body charged by the Constitution with determining electoral disputes had declared Gbagbo to be the winner. On 18 December, Gbagbo ordered all UN peacekeepers to leave the country. However, the UN has refused, and the Security Council has extended the mandate of the UN Mission in Ivory Coast until 30 June 2011. International powers have been in talks to enlarge the UN force in the Ivory Coast. The World Bank has halted loans to the country and travel restrictions have been placed on Gbagbo and his political allies. The rising political tensions resulted in a sharp jump in cocoa prices, up to an increase of 10 percent, since the Ivory Coast is the world's largest producer of the crop.

After fighting the Second Ivorian Civil War, Gbagbo was forcefully removed from office and Ouattara took office as the undisputed president on 11 April 2011. Afterward, Gbagbo was indicted and arrested by the International Criminal Court.

== Background ==
=== Date ===
Following the March 2007 agreement with the New Forces, the election was planned to be held in the first quarter of 2008. On 6 August 2007, President Laurent Gbagbo said it would be possible, with goodwill and determination, to hold the election as early as December 2007. This was greeted with widespread skepticism by observers and the opposition, who said that the preparations for elections would be incomplete at such an early stage.

It was announced on 12 September 2007 that the process of voter identification and registration would begin on 25 September, and if it went well it was expected to be completed by the end of 2007. On 13 September, the President of the Independent Electoral Commission (CEI), Robert Mambé, said that the presidential election should be held, "at the latest", ten months after the end of the identification process, around October 2008, and that the parliamentary election should be held 45 days after the presidential election. On 18 September, Gbagbo again expressed his desire to see the elections held quickly and said that he was opposed to the "remote dates" being suggested.

On 27 November 2007, Gbagbo and Guillaume Soro reached an agreement in Ouagadougou, Burkina Faso, that the election would be held by the end of June 2008; the electoral commission was to propose the specific date of the election. Gbagbo reiterated on 19 December that the election would be held no later than the end of June 2008, and he said that he would visit all the regions held by the New Forces by March 2008 and would then make a report to the Constitutional Council, which would in turn approve the holding of the election.

French Minister of Foreign Affairs Bernard Kouchner said on 27 January 2008 that the election might be delayed slightly past the end of June deadline due to technical requirements, particularly the need to update voter lists.

By March 2008, the common view among observers was that it would be impossible to hold the election as early as June. Although no leading political figures had yet expressed that view, in March Gbagbo referred to the importance of considering actual conditions and said that it would not mean "death" if the election was not held in June.

On 14 April, Government Spokesman Amadou Koné announced that the presidential election would be held on 30 November 2008, thus delaying it by five months. According to Koné, the date was chosen by the CEI, which had presented a report to the government. Koné said that the parliamentary election would be held on a different date. Gbagbo expressed enthusiasm on the occasion, describing it as "a great day for Côte d'Ivoire". According to Soro's spokesman Sindou Méité, a "broad consensus" had been reached by Soro and other leading political figures regarding the date. The PDCI and RDR welcomed the announcement of a date, although they remained cautious; the United Nations Operation in Côte d'Ivoire also welcomed it. On the same day, Gbagbo signed a decree outlining the terms of cooperation between the National Institute of Statistics and the French company Sagem, the latter of which is tasked with surveying the population so that voter lists can be updated and new voter cards can be created.

By the first half of September 2008, there was widespread speculation that the election could be again delayed to early 2009. Gbagbo said in mid-September that a delay to 15 December would be needed unless the period allowed for challenges to the electoral register was truncated; however, CEI President Robert Mambé said on 18 September that such a delay was "out of the question" for the time being, noting that the CEI considered meeting the 30 November date to be "a moral obligation".

At a New Forces meeting on 11 October, the group recommended that the election be postponed to 2009, citing concerns about security and inadequate progress in identity card distribution. Speaking on 29 October, Prime Minister Soro suggested the possibility of a delay, saying that the CEI had been asked "to work out a reliable time-frame to give us an idea of a probable definitive date for the election".

On 7 November, the UN Security Council called for the election to be held by mid-2009 at the latest. At a meeting of the Ivorian political parties in Ouagadougou on 10 November 2008, it was decided, as expected, that the 30 November date could not be met and a delay was necessary. The three main candidates—President Gbagbo, Alassane Ouattara, and Henri Konan Bédié—attended the meeting, as did Prime Minister Soro. A new date for the election was not announced, and the parties asked the CEI to submit an updated timetable no later than 31 December. Blaise Compaoré, the President of Burkina Faso, said that the progress of voter registration had to be considered in setting any new date, while expressing his hope that registration would be finished before 1 January 2009. Ouattara said that a date should only be set when "good visibility" existed, while Bédié said that they had "put the cart before the horse" and that a new date should not be set until it was clear that the identification process was successful.

In early 2009, Innocent Anaky, the President of the Movement of the Forces of the Future (MFA), said that he did not believe that the election would actually be held in 2009.

Soro announced on 14 May 2009, that the election would be held on 29 November 2009. In a statement on 15 May, UN Secretary-General Ban Ki-moon called on "all Ivorian parties to respect this date and to work together to complete the remaining tasks related to the electoral process."

The first round of the election had been delayed six times in the previous five years.

=== Voter identification and registration ===
The public hearings of the identification process were intended for people born in Ivory Coast who did not yet have identification papers. The hearings were launched on 25 September 2007, and were to be held first in Ouragahio and Ferkessédougou, respectively the home regions of Gbagbo and Prime Minister Guillaume Soro. Gbagbo asserted that there were about 300,000 eligible voters who could be identified through the process, but the New Forces said that there were up to three million eligible voters. The French company Sagem was designated as the technical operator of the electoral register in November 2007.

The second meeting of the Cadre permanent de concertation (CPC), which is responsible for the implementation of the peace agreement, was concluded in Ouagadougou on 24 January 2008. At this meeting, it was decided to facilitate voter registration for those individuals receiving supplementary birth certificates through the identification process, to allow parties to begin campaigning in February, and to publish the voter list from the 2000 presidential election on the Internet.

In an assessment of the public identification hearings on 10 April 2008, the United Nations Operation in Côte d'Ivoire (ONUCI) said that 400,000 back-up birth certificates had been issued over the course of six months and that 7,337 public hearings had been held in 11 administrative areas.

1,500 of the necessary 6,000 cases of material for voter registration cards arrived in Côte d'Ivoire on 10 August 2008, according to Sagem; the remaining material was expected to arrive within one week.

The Ministry of Justice announced on 19 August that 50 voter identification teams would be sent from 27 August to 12 September to areas of the country that were inadequately covered in the previous identification process.

The electoral census began on 15 September and was planned to continue for 30 to 45 days. The purpose of the census was to update the electoral register and provide citizens with new identity cards; all citizens above the age of 16 were to be included in the census, although only those above age 18 were to receive voter cards. The initial phase of the census was to occur in three southern towns—Grand-Bassam, Dabou, and Gagnoa, as well as three northern towns—Ferkessédougou, Bouna, and Man—and Yamoussoukro, the capital. Once the electoral register was completed, there was to be a one-month period during which the register could be challenged; however, Gbagbo said shortly before the beginning of the census that he wanted this period for challenges to be reduced to 15 days. According to Gbagbo, if this reduction was not accepted, it would be necessary to delay the election from 30 November to 15 December.

11,000 centers for identification were intended to be opened around the country; by 10 November, when the election was delayed to 2009, 774 centers had opened in Abidjan, but in the rest of the country the process had stalled.

There were 5.4 million registered voters at the time of the 2000 presidential election; it was expected that the number of registered voters for the new election could be up to eight million. However, in early December 2008 only 2 million voters had registered.

Identification was expected to be completed by February 2009.

=== Candidates ===
In an interview with Agence France Presse on 20 May 2007, Henri Konan Bédié, who was president from 1993 to 1999, said that he would be the presidential candidate of his party, the Democratic Party of Ivory Coast – African Democratic Rally (PDCI-RDA), in the 2008 election. He said that his party was impatient for the election to be held, and also said that the opposition would not back a single candidate in the first round of the election. Bédié addressed a rally in Dabou on 22 September 2007, in which he declared the need for a "shock treatment" to return the country to normal, promised to restore the economy, and strongly criticized Gbagbo.

Alassane Ouattara, who was Prime Minister from 1990 to 1993, was designated as the presidential candidate of the Rally of the Republicans (RDR) at a congress of his party held on 1–3 February 2008. At the congress, he invited the New Forces, from whom he had previously distanced himself, to team up with the RDR for the election.

The RDR and the PDCI-RDA are both members of the Rally of Houphouëtistes, and while Ouattara and Bédié will run separately in the first round of the presidential election, each has agreed to support the other if only one of them makes it into a potential second round.

While Ouattara and Bédié have said that full implementation of the peace agreement, including total disarmament of the New Forces, is not necessary prior to the holding of the election, Pascal Affi N'Guessan, the President of the Ivorian Popular Front (FPI), Gbagbo's party, has said that disarmament must be completed before the election.

Soro, as Prime Minister, is barred from standing as a candidate by the peace agreement. Describing himself as an "arbiter of the electoral process", Soro said in a March 2008 interview with Jeune Afrique that the New Forces would not back any candidate and its members could vote for whomever they wished. Rumors have suggested that Soro and Gbagbo have secretly agreed on an arrangement whereby Soro would support Gbagbo and, in exchange, Gbagbo would back Soro in the subsequent presidential election; Soro derided these rumors as "gossip".

On 26 April 2008, the Republican Union for Democracy (URD), which is part of the National Congress for Resistance and Democracy (CNRD), announced that it was backing Gbagbo's candidacy.

Speaking in Soubré on 27 April, Bédié urged "peace-loving Ivorian citizens and the international community to ensure that elections ... are fair, transparent, clean and open".

Gbagbo was designated as the presidential candidate of the ruling Ivorian Popular Front (FPI) on 30 August 2008 at the end of a party congress in Yamoussoukro, in which over 3,000 delegates participated. He was the only candidate for the FPI nomination at the congress, which he did not personally attend. According to FPI President N'Guessan, Gbagbo intended to wait until October to make his formal announcement that he was running for re-election.

By September 2008, Gbagbo and his wife Simone, as well as Bédié, had toured parts of the country in preparation for the election, but Ouattara was, by comparison, viewed as inactive following his nomination in February. The RDR announced on 11 September that Ouattara would present his programme at a convention in Yamoussoukro on 4 October.

The Assembly for Peace, Equity and Progress (RPP) announced on 6 September 2009 it would support Gbagbo.

=== Controversy ===
==== Disarmament and security ====
On 22 December 2007, a disarmament process planned to take place over the course of three months began with government soldiers and former rebels withdrawing from their positions near what had been the buffer zone; the forces of the two sides respectively went to barracks in Yamoussoukro and Bouaké. Gbagbo and Soro were present at Tiebissou to mark the event; Gbagbo said that, as a result, the front lines of the conflict no longer existed, and Soro said that it "effectively, concretely marks the beginning of disarmament". Government forces completed their withdrawal from the front lines on 24 January 2008.

After meeting with Burkinabe President Blaise Compaoré, the mediator of the Ivorian crisis, in Ouagadougou, United Nations Secretary-General Ban Ki-moon urged the Ivorians to "move forward in the process of disarmament, reunification of the country and full restoration of state authority". Although he noted that progress had been made, Ban said that he and Compaoré agreed that there was much more to do. The New Forces have blamed the stalling of the process on lack of money.

On 29 April, Ouattara called for the public identification hearings, which were due to end in May, to be extended by one or two months, saying that a number of people had not yet been able to participate.

The process of disarmament, demobilization and reintegration of the New Forces, which had been launched on 22 December 2007, began in Bouaké on 2 May 2008 with 1,000 former rebels. 43,000 former rebels were planned to ultimately be involved in the process, which is intended to last for about five months, with completion envisioned by late September, according to New Forces General Soumaïla Bakayoko. Bakayoko said that about 22,000 former rebels would "receive funding to carry out micro-projects", while the remainder would be integrated into the army. The numbers were later given as 36,000 total, with 10,000 to be integrated and 26,000 to participate in rehabilitation projects or national civic service. The government said that it did not have the money to fund rehabilitation projects.

By late May, with the disarmament process continuing, 2,568 New Forces soldiers had been grouped in camps. As part of the process, each of the former rebels were planned to each receive 90,000 CFA francs per month for three months; the first of these monthly payments occurred in May. A delay in the June payment caused unrest among the New Forces in Bouaké.

Members of the New Forces loyal to Zacharia Koné, a New Forces commander who was dismissed from his command in May 2008 for indiscipline, briefly mutinied in Vavoua and Seguela on 28 June. An aide to Soro, Alain Lobognon, subsequently said on 30 June that the government did not have enough money to complete the disarmament and implementation of the peace agreement, complaining that the international community was not sending aid. According to Lobognon, "the peace process is in danger because the prime minister does not have the means to implement his policies", and he described the situation as a "crisis".

Choi Young-jin, the UN Special Representative to Ivory Coast, launched an ONUCI program in Bouaké on 15 August to fund 1,000 microprojects for those members of the New Forces who were not integrated into the army. According to ONUCI, the program was intended "to create a stable security environment for free and transparent elections by re-introducing ex-fighters socially and economically back into their old communities". The cost of this program was estimated at about 44.4 billion CFA francs, and financing for it was to be partially provided by the World Bank and the United Nations Development Programme.

A security plan for the election was approved by the commanders of the Ivorian forces and the ONUCI peacekeeping forces on 12 September 2008. ONUCI commander General Fernand Marcel Amoussou also spoke positively of the cooperation between the national army and the New Forces on this occasion, saying that it was proceeding "in a brotherly, pleasant and effective manner".

A New Forces camp in Seguela was attacked on 24 November 2008; the attackers were said to have freed prisoners and attempted to take guns and ammunition. According to the New Forces, eight of the attackers were killed, along with one of their own men.

Gbagbo, Soro, and Compaoré signed an agreement on 24 December 2008, according to which 5,000 New Forces soldiers would be integrated into the army over the course of two years, while another 3,400 would enter the police and gendarmerie. In addition, all of the New Forces soldiers being demobilized were to be paid 50,000 CFA francs.

==== International funding and involvement ====
On 7 May, several other countries, including France, Japan, and the United States, announced that they were providing 115 billion CFA francs in aid money to fund the election and the process of resolving the civil war. The third meeting of the CPC, chaired by Compaoré, was held on 9 May at the House of Deputies in Yamoussoukro; those present included Gbagbo, Soro, Ouattara, and Bédié. Soro was to present a report on the peace process and CEI President Robert Mambé was to present a report on CEI's work. The meeting concluded with a communiqué urgently appealing to the international community to provide financing for the electoral process. According to Soro, another 35 billion CFA francs are needed.

At a meeting with the United Nations Security Council on 9 June, various important figures in the election, including Gbagbo, Ouattara, and Mambé, expressed confidence that the election would be held on schedule. South Africa's Ambassador to the UN, Dumisani Kumalo, observed that, in contrast to the situation a year beforehand, all sides appeared committed to holding the election on a specific date. Members of the Security Council wanted to hear from representatives of the bodies carrying out the electoral census and registration, and these representatives agreed that it would be possible to meet 30 November date. Kumalo credited the unprecedented progress that had been made over the previous year to Ivorian control of the process, and he said that the UN had only an "accompanying" role. According to Kumalo, Gbagbo asked the Security Council to apply pressure to speed up the process, which he felt was not going fast enough, and also wanted the UN to take a larger role in financing the election; however, he was rebuffed by the Security Council on both points. Despite the council's concerns about security, Gbagbo did not feel that this would be a problem; Ouattara said that it was important for UN peacekeepers to ensure security during the election. Mambé, for his part, said that he was actively working to finalize the system of voter registration, and he called on electoral observers to begin observing the registration process, rather than waiting until "two or three days before the election to observe". Bakayoko, the former New Forces commander, also spoke to the Security Council, saying that disarmament was proceeding "little by little".

On 14 June, Kouchner visited Ivory Coast and met with Gbagbo and Ouattara, among others. He accepted that there was still not enough money to fund the election and agreed to help Côte d'Ivoire find African and international financial assistance, although he said that France would not send any more of its own money. The cost of the election had been estimated at over 100 billion CFA francs, and although 115 billion had already been pledged by other countries, part of that money was to go towards the disarmament process.

Although the mandate of ONUCI and French peacekeepers was set to expire on 30 July 2008, the UN Security Council unanimously voted on 29 July to extend the mandate to 31 January 2009 so that the peacekeepers could "support the organization of free, open, fair and transparent elections". The Ivorian Permanent Representative to the UN, Alcide Djédjé, said that the election would enable his country to get off the Security Council's agenda and "regain [its] full sovereignty", but also emphasized that money was still needed to fund the election.

On 27 January 2009, the Security Council voted to again extend the peacekeepers' mandate by six months, while also reducing ONUCI's size from 8,115 to 7,450 personnel. Additionally, the Security Council called for the establishment of a clear timetable for holding the election. UN envoy Choi Young-jin expressed concern that "for the first time since the signing of the Ouagadougou peace deal in March 2007, the Ivorian people and the international community have neither a date nor a timeframe for the elections." He argued that the organization of the election could falter if it was not driven by a clear objective.

== Results ==
=== First round ===
As the polls closed for the first round, more unrest was feared as the former rebels were still armed in the north, powerful militias still existed in the west and neither armed group was willing to accept defeat. The second round date was confirmed despite opposition allegations of fraud and demands for a recount of the first round of votes.

Expatriate ballots had former Prime Minister Alassane Ouattara ahead of incumbent President Laurent Gbagbo, with former President Henri Konan Bédié in third place. Some other sources put Bédié in the lead with 42% to Gbagbo's 31% and Ouattara's 24%. Official provisional results had Gbagbo in the lead with 38.3%, Ouattara with 32.1% and Bédié with 25.2%. The opposition parties called for a recount, but the Constitutional Council quickly announced official results and confirmed Gbagbo's first round lead.

=== Second round ===
With the second round looming, Gbagbo's supporters went on the offensive with aggressive criticism of Ouattara; FPI President Pascal Affi N'Guessan called him "the godfather of the political violence and the rebellion." Bédié, meanwhile, initially hesitated to provide his expected endorsement of Ouattara; Bédié's position was considered a crucial factor for the second round, as the votes of his supporters could decide the outcome of the election. Bédié and Ouattara had been seen all along as somewhat incongruous allies, in light of their 1990s rivalry, and Bédié's hesitation suggested to some that their alliance was tenuous. Bédié endorsed Ouattara shortly thereafter, however. Declaring that "this alliance is our strength, the doubters will be proved wrong", Ouattara predicted victory.

Despite Bédié's position, Gbagbo's campaign hoped to draw some of Bédié's supporters over to their candidate's side. Bédié's support was largely concentrated among members of the Baoulé ethnic group. Both sides employed harsh rhetoric at their rallies, denouncing their opponents as practically criminal. Gbagbo declared that the election was "a true battle between the democrats and the coup leaders", accusing Ouattara of orchestrating both the 1999 coup that ousted Bédié and the 2002 coup attempt that failed to topple Gbagbo and set off the civil war. Ouattara, for his part, accused Gbagbo of working "to divide Ivorians, to bring war to Ivory Coast and to loot the resources of one tribe and one clan", and he said that Gbagbo's accusations were lies.

The second round was held on 28 November 2010. Results for the diaspora vote were announced first, on 29 November 2010; Ouattara had 6,371 votes (59.97%) and Gbagbo had 4,252 votes (40.03%). This batch of results was too small to be particularly meaningful, however. Before any further results were announced, Gbagbo supporters began raising objections to the conduct of the election in the overwhelmingly pro-Ouattara north of the country; they alleged disruptive and abusive behavior by Ouattara supporters that invalidated the results in certain regions, or even the election as a whole. Bamba Yacouba, speaking for the CEI, attempted to announce the first significant batch of results at a press conference on 30 November, but a pro-Gbagbo member of the CEI, Damana Adia Pickass, snatched the papers away from him and tore them to pieces, contesting the validity of the results Yacouba was preparing to announce. No results were announced.

In a tense atmosphere, each side accused the other of attempting to win the election through fraud. Ouattara's camp alleged that Gbagbo's aim was "obstructing the electoral commission and confiscating power". At an RDR office in pro-Gbagbo territory in Abidjan, eight Ouattara supporters were reportedly shot and killed by security forces late on 1 December 2010.

Candidate	Party	First round		Second round (CC)		Second round (IEC)	
Candidate	Party	Votes	%	Votes	%	Votes	%
Laurent Gbagbo	Ivorian Popular Front	1,756,504	38.04	2,054,537	51.45	2,107,055	45.90
Alassane Ouattara	Rally of the Republicans	1,481,091	32.07	1,938,672	48.55	2,483,164	54.10
Henri Konan Bédié	Democratic Party of Ivory Coast – African Democratic Rally	1,165,532	25.24				
Albert Toikeusse Mabri	Union for Democracy and Peace in Ivory Coast	118,671	2.57				
Gnamien Konan	Union for Ivory Coast	17,171	0.37				
Francis Wodié	Ivorian Workers' Party	13,406	0.29				
Siméon Konan		12,357	0.27				
Jacqueline Oble		12,273	0.27				
Pascal Tagoua		11,674	0.25				
Innocent Anaky	Movement of the Forces of the Future	10,663	0.23				
Adama Dolo		5,972	0.13				
N'Douba Enoh Aka		5,311	0.12				
Félix Akoto Yao		4,773	0.10				
Henri Tohou	Socialist Union of the People	2,423	0.05				
Total		4,617,821	100.00	3,993,209	100.00	4,590,219	100.00
Valid votes		4,617,821	95.34	3,993,209	97.83	4,590,219	97.89
Invalid/blank votes		225,624	4.66	88,556	2.17	99,147	2.11
Total votes		4,843,445	100.00	4,081,765	100.00	4,689,366	100.00
Registered voters/turnout		5,784,490	83.73	5,725,721	71.29	5,780,804	81.12
Source: African Elections Database, CEI,

== Aftermath ==
=== CEI announcement ===
On 2 December 2010, CEI President Youssouf Bakayoko announced provisional results showing that Alassane Ouattara had won the election in the second round with 54.1% of the vote, against 45.9% for Laurent Gbagbo; he reported that turnout was 81.09%. Results had been expected and then postponed for days, beyond the deadline, and Bakayoko's appearance to announce the results—at an Abidjan hotel heavily guarded by the United Nations—took the press by surprise. Bakayoko reportedly chose to announce the results at the hotel, which Ouattara had been using as "his base", because he wanted to have the security of UN protection when doing so.

=== Proclamation of the Constitutional Council ===
Paul Yao N'Dre, the President of the Constitutional Council then took to the airwaves to say that the CEI had no authority left to announce any results, because it had already missed its deadline to announce them, and consequently the results were invalid. N'Dre announced that the results in seven northern regions were cancelled, thereby swinging the outcome narrowly in favor of Gbagbo, who was credited with 51.45% of the vote while Ouattara had 48.55%. According to article 94 of the Ivorian Constitution, the Constitutional Council decides on electoral disputes, and proclaims the definitive results of presidential elections.

=== Ouattara announcement ===
On the basis of the CEI's results, Ouattara maintained that he was "the elected President" and said that the Constitutional Council had abused its authority.

The New Forces and Prime Minister Soro both supported Ouattara's claim to victory; Soro said that he considered Ouattara the rightful President and offered his resignation to Ouattara on 4 December.
