= Boguédia =

- Town and sub-prefecture
- Location in Ivory Coast
- Coordinates: 6°38′N 6°31′W
- Country: Ivory Coast
- District: Sassandra-Marahoué
- Region: Haut-Sassandra
- Department: Issia

Population (2014)
  - Total: 20,943
- Time zone: UTC+0 (GMT)

Boguédia is a town in west-central Ivory Coast. It is a sub-prefecture of Issia Department in Haut-Sassandra Region, Sassandra-Marahoué District.

Boguédia was a commune until March 2012, when it became one of 1,126 communes nationwide that were abolished.

In 2014, the population of the sub-prefecture of Boguédia was 20,943.

== Villages ==
The 18 villages of the sub-prefecture of Boguédia and their population in 2014 are:

1. Badouboua (935)
2. Békora (614)
3. Bezibouo (917)
4. Biga (600)
5. Bissaguhé (2,384)
6. Boguedia (5,177)
7. Gogoguhé (1,920)
8. Guefra (533)
9. Labazoubia (450)
10. Lagozoan (803)
11. Liga (1,133)
12. Makua (650)
13. Massa (449)
14. Mimia 1 (337)
15. Mimia 2 (1,561)
16. Zaguédia (924)
17. Zokrodépié (920)
18. Zuzua (636)
