= Bédiala =

- Town, sub-prefecture, and commune
- Location in Ivory Coast
- Coordinates: 7°10′N 6°18′W
- Country: Ivory Coast
- District: Sassandra-Marahoué
- Region: Haut-Sassandra
- Department: Daloa

Area
  - Total: 1,110 km^{2} (430 sq mi)

Population (2021 census)
  - Total: 84,474
  - Density: 76.1/km^{2} (197/sq mi)
  - Town: 17,295
- (2014 census)
- Time zone: UTC+0 (GMT)

Bédiala is a town in west-central Ivory Coast. It is a sub-prefecture and commune of Daloa Department in Haut-Sassandra Region, Sassandra-Marahoué District.

In 2021, the population of the sub-prefecture of Bédiala was 84,474.

== Villages ==
The 16 villages of the sub-prefecture of Bédiala and their population in 2014 are:

1. Bandiahi (6,615)
2. Banoufla (4,061)
3. Baïfla (1,906)
4. Bialata (967)
5. Brohouta 1 (2,584)
6. Brohouta 2 (1,611)
7. Bèfla (9,723)
8. Bédiala (17,295)
9. Gnanagonfla (1,997)
10. Golikro (1,495)
11. Gouriniani (4,876)
12. Gouénoufla (2,402)
13. Koinzra (592)
14. Luénoufla (19,643)
15. Ourouta-Kouhon (1,207)
16. Ourouta-Thon (4,219)
