= Innocent Anaky =

Ivorian politician

Innocent Kobena Anaky (born 27 July 1948) is an Ivorian politician and the President of the Movement of the Forces of the Future (MFA), an opposition party. He served in the government of Côte d'Ivoire as Minister of State for Transport from 2003 to 2006.

== Biography ==
Anaky was born in Bondoukou and was an adopted son of President Félix Houphouët-Boigny. He founded the Inter Transit company in the late 1970s and headed the company as its President Director-General. In November 1988, he participated in the constitutive congress of the opposition Ivorian Popular Front (FPI). Anaky used money from his business to finance the FPI. Houphouët-Boigny loaned Anaky 100 million CFA francs for the company, but Anaky allegedly used some of that money to support the FPI. As a result of his political activities, Anaky was arrested and sentenced to 20 years in prison. He was released in 1991.

In December 1992, Anaky established his own political party, the Movement of the Forces of the Future. Following the December 1999 coup d'etat, he was arrested. In the December 2000–January 2001 parliamentary election, he was elected to the National Assembly as an MFA candidate in Kouassi-Datèkro constituency; he was the only MFA candidate to win a seat. Following a political agreement in 2003, he was appointed to the government as Minister of State for Transport. He headed a delegation to Ouagadougou, Burkina Faso, in May 2003 to engage in talks regarding trade routes through Côte d'Ivoire that had been closed to Burkina Faso due to the outbreak of the Ivorian Civil War in 2002.

In the midst of a scandal regarding the dumping of toxic waste, he was attacked and beaten by angry residents of Abidjan, who also damaged his car, in mid-September 2006; he was saved by security forces. He was excluded from the government in a cabinet reshuffle at the time of the scandal. Anaky placed blame for the dumping of the toxic waste on port and district authorities.

In early 2009, Anaky said that he did not believe the planned and long-delayed presidential election would actually be held in 2009. In a state television broadcast on 18 March 2009, Anaky called for the people to overthrow President Laurent Gbagbo, in emulation of the successful ouster of Madagascar's President Marc Ravalomanana; Anaky was subsequently arrested by the Direction of Territorial Surveillance on 20 March. He was questioned and released on 21 March, and on 23 March he announced that the MFA was withdrawing from the coalition government, in which the party had held one portfolio.

Following a stampede at a football match in Abidjan on 29 March 2009, in which 29 people were killed, Anaky blamed youth leader Charles Blé Goudé and the ruling FPI for the incident.
