= 2008 Ivorian New Forces unrest =

Three serious incidents of unrest in the New Forces, a former rebel group in Côte d'Ivoire, occurred in mid-2008. These incidents occurred in the midst of a disarmament process, according to which a portion of the New Forces fighters were to be integrated into the army, while the majority were to be given work on projects. The disarmament process was to be followed by a presidential election and a parliamentary election.

== Disorder in Bouaké ==
By late May, with the disarmament process continuing, 2,568 New Forces soldiers had been grouped in camps. As part of the process, each of the former rebels were planned to each receive 90,000 CFA francs per month for three months; the first of these monthly payments occurred in May. The June payment was delayed by one week, and on June 16, angry New Forces soldiers protested in Bouaké, demanding payment, disrupting the city, and seizing vehicles. Prime Minister Guillaume Soro, who also leads the New Forces, sent a financial team on June 17 to make the payments. Although payments began to be made early on June 18, another violent protest took place on the same day; New Forces soldiers reportedly fired into the air, attacked civilians, seized vehicles, set up barricades, and looted shops. By evening on June 18, Bouaké was calm again, as security was increased through joint patrols of the New Forces and UN peacekeepers.

== Unrest in Vavoua and Seguela ==
New Forces fighters loyal to Zacharia Koné, a New Forces commander who was dismissed from his command in May 2008 for indiscipline, reportedly mutinied in Vavoua and Seguela on June 28. The unrest was said to have begun in Vavoua and then spread to Seguela. Three civilians were reportedly killed, along with one of the fighters involved in the unrest; another of the fighters was reportedly wounded. The unrest reportedly ended on the same day; according to official sources, the soldiers surrendered on the condition that they would be protected by French peacekeeping forces.

New Forces officials differed on whether this unrest was caused by an issue with the disarmament payments or whether it was a result of Koné's dismissal; the soldiers involved in the unrest said that they wanted payment of the disarmament money, although Koné's dismissal also appeared to be a factor. An aide to Soro, Alain Lobognon, said on June 29 that Soro had forbidden the use of force in dealing with the unrest. Lobognon also disputed the widespread characterization of the unrest as a mutiny and said that the soldiers were under the protection of UN and French peacekeepers. Koné's replacement as commander of the Seguela region, Issiaka Ouattara, said that he was trying to maintain calm and was not using force, in accordance with Soro's orders. On the same day, one of the rebellious soldiers in Vavoua told Agence France-Presse that they had not surrendered in either town, that their force was several hundred strong and was in control of Vavoua, and that they were holding their commanders hostage.

New Forces spokesman Sidiki Konate said that the problems that caused the unrest would be addressed and that the soldiers would be pardoned. Lobognon subsequently said on June 30 that the government did not have enough money to complete the disarmament and implementation of the peace agreement, complaining that the international community was not sending aid. According to Lobognon, "the peace process is in danger because the prime minister does not have the means to implement his policies", and he described the situation as a "crisis".

About 300 people in Seguela protested on July 2, calling for resolution of the situation and for the mutineers to be quickly disarmed. The New Forces Chief of Staff, General Soumaila Bakayoko, met with the restive fighters, who numbered about 320, at a camp near Seguela later on July 2. Although a spokesman for the soldiers acknowledged the authority of Soro and Bakayoko, some of them shouted demands for Koné to be restored to his command, expressing dissatisfaction with his replacement, Issiaka Ouattara. Bakayoko left the meeting as a result.

== August 2008 Bouaké protest ==
About 300 members of the New Forces, seeking payment of five million CFA francs each, blocked entrances to Bouaké in August 2008. After two days of this, New Forces zone commander Cherif Ousmane began holding talks with them on August 22.

== November 2008 attack in Seguela ==
A New Forces camp in Seguela was attacked on November 24, 2008; the attackers were said to have freed prisoners and attempted to take guns and ammunition. According to the New Forces, eight of the attackers were killed, along with one of their own men.
