= Saïoua =

- Town, sub-prefecture, and commune
- Location in Ivory Coast
- Coordinates: 6°30′N 6°16′W
- Country: Ivory Coast
- District: Sassandra-Marahoué
- Region: Haut-Sassandra
- Department: Issia

Area
  - Total: 837 km^{2} (323 sq mi)

Population (2021 census)
  - Total: 100,085
  - Density: 120/km^{2} (310/sq mi)
  - Town: 26,892
- (2014 census)
- Time zone: UTC+0 (GMT)

Saïoua is a town in west-central Ivory Coast. It is a sub-prefecture and commune of Issia Department in Haut-Sassandra Region, Sassandra-Marahoué District.

In 2021, the population of the sub-prefecture of Saïoua was 100,085.

== Villages ==
The 27 villages of the sub-prefecture of Saïoua and their population in 2014 are:

1. Balam (1 033)
2. Bogouloboua (1 352)
3. Bolia (772)
4. Dahira (7 482)
5. Digbam (3 523)
6. Diloboua (1 476)
7. Gabia (3 547)
8. Godoua (4 289)
9. Grovéhio (737)
10. Korébouo (1 876)
11. Loukouahio (1 378)
12. Magoudiboua (1 285)
13. Niakia (1 613)
14. Niébélahio (320)
15. Ouandahio (345)
16. Saioua (26 892)
17. Zikibouo (590)
18. Broma (1 853)
19. Dagourahio (726)
20. Dérahio (2 211)
21. Gazéhio (2 480)
22. Korézouzoua (2 704)
23. Krizabahio (1 552)
24. Louoboua (3 216)
25. Niaourahio (759)
26. Zadihoa (4 386)
27. Zéga (8 026)
