= Blah =

Blah, blah blah etc. may refer to:

== Music ==
- Blah-Blah-Blah (Iggy Pop album), 1986, or its title song
- Blah Blah Blah (Blahzay Blahzay album), 1996
- Blah Blah Blah (EP), 2018 by Armin van Buuren or the title song
- Blah Blah (EP), a 2006 EP and song by Lady Sovereign
- Blá Blá Blá, a 2004 album by Rouge
- Blah...Blah...Blah...Love Songs for the New Millennium, a 2004 album by Scum of the Earth
- "Blah Blah Blah" (Armin van Buuren song), 2018
- "Blah Blah Blah" (Gershwin song), 1931
- "Blah Blah Blah" (Kesha song), 2010
- "Blah Blah Blah" by Nicola Paone, 1959
- "Blah Blah Blah" by Todrick Hall from Straight Outta Oz
- "Bla Bla Bla" (Gigi D'Agostino song), 1999
- "Bla bla bla" (Priscilla song), 2002
- "Blá Blá Blá" (song), by Rouge, 2004
- Blah Records, a British hip hop record label
- Blah Blah Blah (Itzy song), 2022

== Film and television ==
- Bla Bla, a 2011 National Film Board of Canada interactive animated film
- Blah Blah Blah (TV series), an Australian Broadcasting Corporation comedy TV series that starred Andrew Denton
- Blah Blah Blah, a 1995 short film written and directed by Julie Delpy
- Blah Blah, a character whose real name is not known, played by Abigail Spencer in "How I Met Everyone Else", a 2007 episode of US television series How I Met Your Mother

== Politics ==
- The Blah! Party, a political party in the United Kingdom aimed at attracting protest voters
- Moses Blah (1947–2013), president of Liberia from 11 August to 14 October 2003

== Visual art ==
- Blah! Blah! Blah!, a painting series executed by Mel Bochner between 2008 and 2012

== See also ==
- Ramaria acrisiccescens, commonly known as blah coral
- BLA (disambiguation), for the acronym
- Blaa, a doughy, white bread bun particular to Waterford City and County Kilkenny, Ireland
