= Herve Bostan Amani =

Ivorian professional footballer

Personal information
- Full name: Herve Bostan Amani
- Date of birth: 11 October 1997 (age 29)
- Place of birth: Broma, Ivory Coast
- Height: 1.84 m (6 ft 0 in)
- Position: Forward

Team information
- Current team: Start Namysłów
- Number: 11

Senior career*
| Years | Team | Apps | (Gls) |
| –2014 | Entente II Lomé | | |
| 2014–2015 | Bostancı Bağcıl | 23 | (14) |
| 2015–2016 | Değirmenlik | 30 | (8) |
| 2017 | Küçük Kaymakli Türk | 12 | (0) |
| 2017–2019 | Javor Ivanjica | 23 | (3) |
| 2017 | → Radnički Kragujevac (loan) | 9 | (1) |
| 2019 | Çetinkaya | 26 | (8) |
| 2020 | Mağusa Türk Gücü | 7 | (0) |
| 2021–2022 | Anagennisi Deryneia | 0 | (0) |
| 2022–2024 | LZS Piotrówka | 40 | (33) |
| 2023 | → Stal Brzeg (loan) | 14 | (4) |
| 2024 | Stal Brzeg | 6 | (0) |
| 2025– | Start Namysłów | 13 | (17) |
- * Club domestic league appearances and goals as of 21:34, 20 June 2025 (UTC)

Herve Bostan Amani (born 11 October 1997) is an Ivorian professional footballer who plays as a forward for Polish club Start Namysłów.

== Club career ==
Born in Broma, a village in west-central Ivory Coast, Amani spent a period in his early career with Togolese side Entente, before he moved to Serbia in summer 2017. In August same year, he signed a three-and-a-half-year professional contract with the Serbian SuperLiga side Javor Ivanjica. Shortly after, Amani moved on six-month loan deal to Radnički Kragujevac. He made his professional debut in 2nd fixture match of the 2017–18 Serbian First League campaign, joining the game from the bench in 1–0 away victory over Metalac Gornji Milanovac.

In July 2021, Amani joined Anagennisi Deryneia.

On 4 March 2023, Amani moved to Polish fourth division side Stal Brzeg on a loan until the end of the season from LZS Piotrówka, whom he joined in mid-2022.

== Career statistics ==
=== Club ===
As of 17 December 2017

Appearances and goals by club, season and competition
| Club | Season | League | | | Cup | | Continental | | Other | | Total | |
| Club | Season | Division | Apps | Goals | Apps | Goals | Apps | Goals | Apps | Goals | Apps | Goals |
|---|---|---|---|---|---|---|---|---|---|---|---|---|
| Radnički Kragujevac (loan) | 2017–18 | First League | 9 | 1 | — | | — | | — | | 9 | 1 |
| Radnički Kragujevac (loan) | Total | | 9 | 1 | — | | — | | — | | 9 | 1 |

== Honours ==
Mağusa Türk Gücü

- Birinci Lig: 2019–20

Start Namysłów

- Regional league Opole I: 2024–25
