= Henriette Diabaté =

Ivorian politician and writer

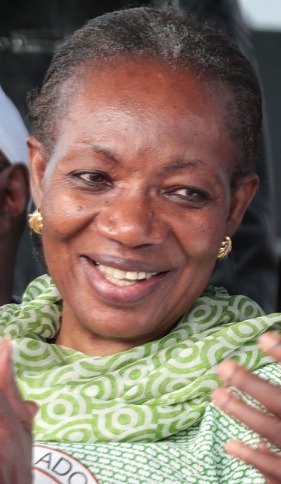
Henriette Dagri Diabaté

Henriette Dagri Diabaté (born March 13, 1935) is an Ivorian politician and writer. A member of the Rally of the Republicans (RDR), Diabaté was Minister of Culture in Côte d'Ivoire from 1990 to 1993 and again in 2000; later, she was Minister of Justice from 2003 to 2005. She became Secretary-General of the RDR in 1999 and has been President of the RDR since 2017.

== Early life ==
Diabaté was born in Abidjan and obtained her master's degree in 1968. Upon graduation, she was a professor of history for University of Abidjan from 1968 to 1995. While teaching, Diabaté received her doctorate degree in history in 1984. Near the end of her teaching career, Diabaté became a founding member of the RDR in 1994.

== Politics ==
A number of RDR leaders, including Diabaté, were arrested on October 27, 1999 on the grounds that they were responsible for violence occurring during protests they organized; in November, they were convicted and sentenced to prison. When soldiers rebelled on December 23, 1999, one of their demands was the release of the imprisoned RDR leaders; when President Henri Konan Bédié rejected the demands, they seized power on December 24 and promptly released the RDR prisoners. Subsequently, Diabaté served as Minister of Culture and La Francophonie under the transitional military regime in 2000.

She was designated as Great Chancellor of Ivorian National Order by President Alassane Ouattara on May 18, 2011 and became the first woman at this highest-ranking of the country.

At the RDR's Third Ordinary Congress on 9–10 September 2017, it was expected that Ouattara would be elected as President of the RDR, but he instead proposed Henriette Diabaté for the post, and she was duly elected by acclamation. Kandia Camara was designated as Secretary-General and Amadou Gon Coulibaly as First Vice-President.

== Personal life ==
Diabaté is married to Lamine Diabaté, a former Minister of State, and has five children.

Political offices
Preceded by ?	Minister of Culture (Côte d'Ivoire); 1990–1993	Succeeded by ?
Preceded by ?	Minister of Justice (Côte d'Ivoire); 2003–2005	Succeeded by ?
