= Alliance for a New Ivory Coast =

Political party in Ivory Coast

The Alliance for a New Ivory Coast (French: Alliance pour une Nouvelle Côte d'Ivoire, ANCI) is an Ivorian political party established as a splinter from the Rally of the Republicans on 6 July 2007 under the leadership of former prime minister Alassane Ouattara.
