= Nationalist Party (Ivory Coast) =

Nationalist Party (in French: Parti Nationaliste), generally referred to as PANA, was an Ivorian opposition group, founded in Abidjan in 1967. It was led by Kraghé Gnagbé. PANA was immediately suppressed by the regime and Gnagbé arrested. Gnagbé had to publicly announce the non-existence of PANA.
