= Union of Democrats of Ivory Coast =

Political party in Ivory Coast

The Union of Democrats of Ivory Coast (French: Union des Démocrates de Côte d'Ivoire (UDCI)) is a political party in Côte d'Ivoire.

In the parliamentary election held on 10 December 2000 and 14 January 2001, the party won 1 out of 225 seats, with Théodore Mel being elected to parliament.

In January 2003, during the First Ivorian Civil War, the UDCI was invited to the talks that resulted in the Linas-Marcoussis Agreement. They had five delegates at the talks.
