= Movement of the Forces of the Future =

Political party in Ivory Coast

The Movement of the Forces of the Future (French: Mouvement des Forces d'Avenir, MFA) is a political party in Côte d'Ivoire. The MFA was founded by Innocent Anaky in December 1992.

In the parliamentary election held on 10 December 2000 and 14 January 2001, the party won one out of 225 seats in the National Assembly of Côte d'Ivoire; Anaky was the only MFA candidate to win a seat.

On 18 May 2005, the MFA was one of four parties (along with the Democratic Party of Côte d'Ivoire, the Rally of the Republicans, and the Union for Democracy and Peace in Côte d'Ivoire) signing an agreement to form a coalition, the Rally of Houphouëtists for Democracy and Peace, ahead of the presidential election then planned for October 2005.

In a state television broadcast on 18 March 2009, MFA President Innocent Anaky called for the people to overthrow President Laurent Gbagbo; he was subsequently arrested. He was questioned and released on 21 March, and on 23 March he announced that the MFA was withdrawing from the coalition government, in which the party had held one portfolio; the party's only minister at the time was the Minister of Reconstruction, Bamba Hamza.

Anaky was the MFA's candidate for the October 2010 presidential election (which was held five years late) but received a negligible portion of the vote.
