= Rally of the Republicans =

Political party in Ivory Coast

Rally of the Republicans Rassemblement des Républicains
- Abbreviation: RDR
- Leader: Alassane Ouattara
- President: Henriette Diabaté
- Founded: June 1994
- Split from: Democratic Party of Côte d'Ivoire
- Ideology: Liberalism; Republicanism
- Political position: Centre
- National affiliation: Rally of Houphouëtists for Democracy and Peace
- International affiliation: Liberal International; Centrist Democrat International
- Continental affiliation: Africa Liberal Network
- Colours: Orange, white, green (Ivorian tricolour)
- Anthem: "Hymne du RDR (Le Républicain)" "Hymn of RDR (The Republican)"
- Seats in the National Assembly: 127 / 255

Website
- rdrci.net

The Rally of the Republicans (French: Rassemblement des Républicains; abbreviated RDR) is a liberal party in Ivory Coast (Côte d'Ivoire). The party is the country's governing party; the party's leader, Alassane Ouattara, is the current President of Ivory Coast.

== History ==
The RDR, which has most of its support in the north of the country, was formed as a liberal offshoot of the ruling party, the Democratic Party of Côte d'Ivoire (PDCI), in mid-1994. Djéni Kobina became the new party's Secretary-General. The RDR sought for Ouattara, who had served as Prime Minister from 1990 to 1993, to become its candidate in the 1995 presidential election. However, amendments to the electoral code required presidential candidates to have lived in the country for five years and to have been born of Ivorian parents. It was thought that these provisions were specifically intended to keep Ouattara out of the running; he had been deputy managing director of the International Monetary Fund for almost five years and his father's family had roots in Burkina Faso. For this reason the RDR boycotted the election.

The RDR held its first ordinary congress on July 2–3, 1995, at which Ouattara was nominated as its presidential candidate. Following Kobina's death, the party held its first extraordinary congress in January 1999 to elect a new Secretary-General. Ouattara was elected President of the RDR on August 1, 1999 at the second extraordinary congress of the party, and he was designated as the party's candidate for the next presidential election.

Ouattara said that he was eligible to stand in this election, scheduled to be held in 2000, pointing to documents which he said demonstrated that he and his parents were of Ivorian birth, as required by the electoral code. He was accused of forging these papers, however, and an investigation was begun. His nationality certificate was annulled by a court in October 1999 and an arrest warrant for Ouattara was issued a month later, although he was in France at the time.

The RDR demonstrated in favor of Ouattara's candidacy; a demonstration in Abidjan reported as being 10,000 strong was held on September 27. A number of RDR leaders, including the party's Secretary-General, Henriette Diabate, were arrested on October 27 on the grounds that they were responsible for violence occurring during protests they organized; in November, they were convicted and sentenced to prison. When soldiers rebelled on December 23, 1999, one of their demands was the release of the imprisoned RDR leaders; when President Henri Konan Bédié rejected the demands, they seized power on December 24 and promptly released the RDR prisoners. Ouattara returned to Ivory Coast on December 29, hailing Bédié's ouster as a "revolution supported by all the Ivorian people".

Despite Ouattara's support for the coup, his candidacy in the October 2000 presidential election was rejected by the Supreme Court, on the same nationality basis that was used to prevent his candidacy during Bédié's presidency. As a result, the RDR decided to boycott the presidential election. It also boycotted the parliamentary election held on 10 December 2000 and 14 January 2001, but nevertheless won five out of 225 seats. The RDR is a full member of the Liberal International, which it joined at the Liberal International's Dakar Congress in 2003.

On May 18, 2005, despite their history of hostility, the RDR and the PDCI signed an agreement to form a coalition, the Rally of Houphouëtists for Democracy and Peace, along with two smaller parties, the Union for Democracy and Peace in Côte d'Ivoire (UDPCI) and the Movement of the Forces of the Future (MFA), ahead of the presidential election then planned for October 2005.

Ouattara was designated as the RDR's presidential candidate at its Second Ordinary Congress on February 1–3, 2008 and also re-elected as President of the RDR for another five years. At the congress, he invited the former rebel Forces Nouvelles de Côte d'Ivoire (New Forces) to team up with the RDR for the election.

In the first round of the 2010 presidential elections, Ouattara finished second, behind incumbent Laurent Gbagbo. In the runoff, Ouattara was announced as finishing first with 54 percent of the vote—a result recognized by virtually the entire international community. Gbagbo, however, refused to step down, touching off a major political crisis that only ended with Gbagbo's capture on 11 April 2011.

Between 2012 and 2016, the RDR's Fadika Sarra Sako served as vice-president of the National Assembly.

At the RDR's Third Ordinary Congress on 9–10 September 2017, it was expected that Ouattara would be elected as President of the RDR, but he instead proposed Henriette Diabaté for the post, and she was duly elected by acclamation. Kandia Camara was designated as Secretary-General and Amadou Gon Coulibaly as First Vice-President. In 2020, Célestine Olibé Trazéré left the RDR for the Rally of Houphouëtists for Democracy and Peace.

== Congress of Republican Women ==
Aya Virginie Toure was elected President of the Rally of Republican Women with a majority vote of 59%.
