= Issia Department =

Coordinates: 6°29′N 6°35′W

Issia Department Département d'Issia
- Department
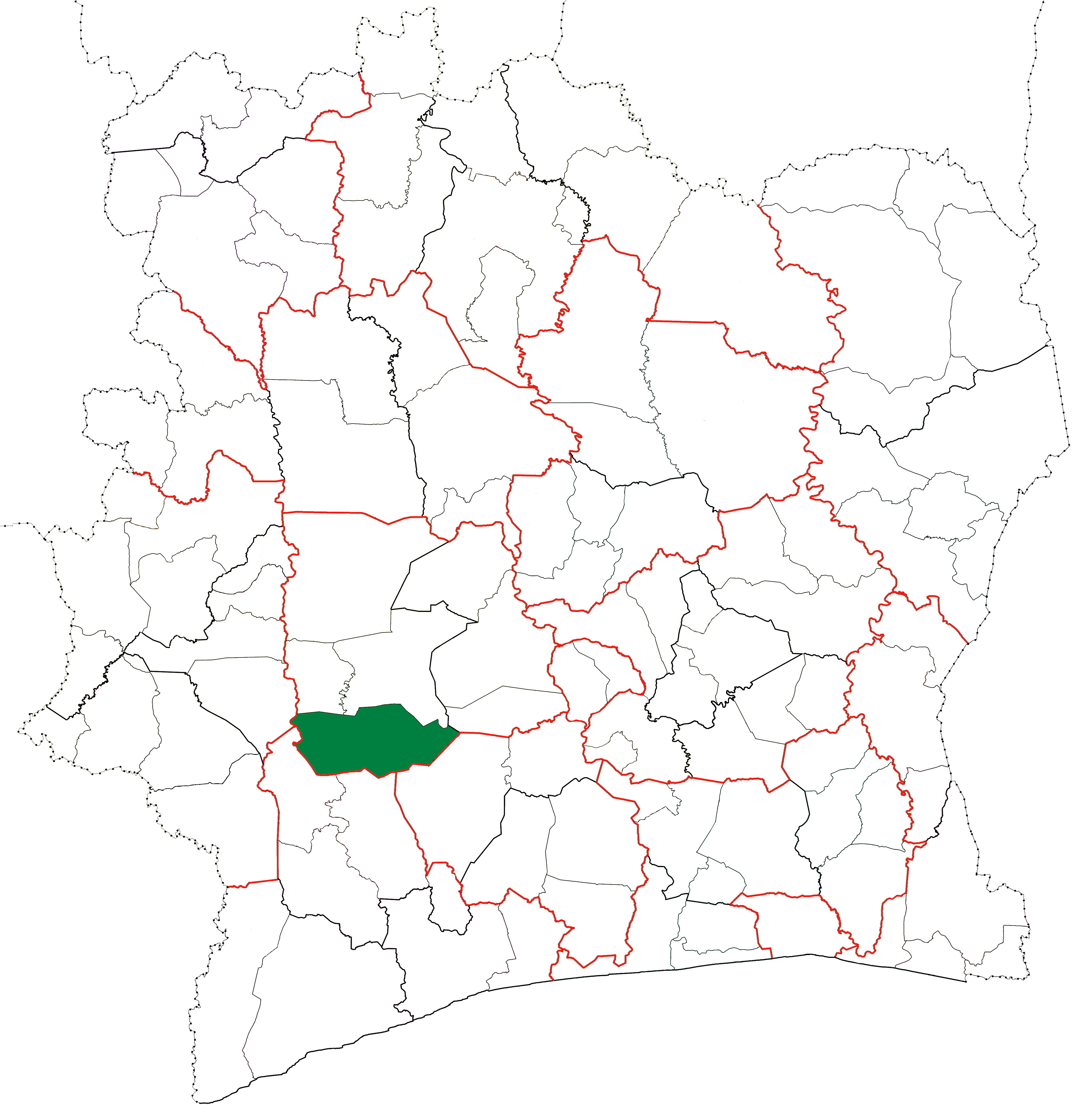
- Location in Ivory Coast. Issia Department has retained the same boundaries since its creation in 1980.
- Country: Ivory Coast
- District: Sassandra-Marahoué
- Region: Haut-Sassandra
- 1980: Established as a first-level subdivision via a division of Daloa Dept
- 1997: Converted to a second-level subdivision
- 2011: Converted to a third-level subdivision
- Departmental seat: Issia

Government
  - Prefect: Benjamin Effoli

Area
  - Total: 3,470 km^{2} (1,340 sq mi)

Population (2021 census)
  - Total: 410,628
  - Density: 118/km^{2} (306/sq mi)
- Time zone: UTC+0 (GMT)

Issia Department is a department of Haut-Sassandra Region in Sassandra-Marahoué District, Ivory Coast. In 2021, its population was 410,628 and its seat is the settlement of Issia. The sub-prefectures of the department are Boguédia, Iboguhé, Issia, Nahio, Namané, Saïoua, and Tapéguia.

== History ==
Issia Department was created in 1980 as first-level subdivision via a split-off from Daloa Department. In 1997, regions were introduced as new first-level subdivisions of Ivory Coast; as a result, all departments were converted into second-level subdivisions. Issia Department was included in Haut-Sassandra Region.

In 2011, districts were introduced as new first-level subdivisions of Ivory Coast. At the same time, regions were reorganised and became second-level subdivisions and all departments were converted into third-level subdivisions. At this time, Issia Department remained part of the retained Haut-Sassandra Region in the new Sassandra-Marahoué District.
