= Daloa Department =

Coordinates: 6°53′N 6°27′W

Daloa Department Département de Daloa
- Department
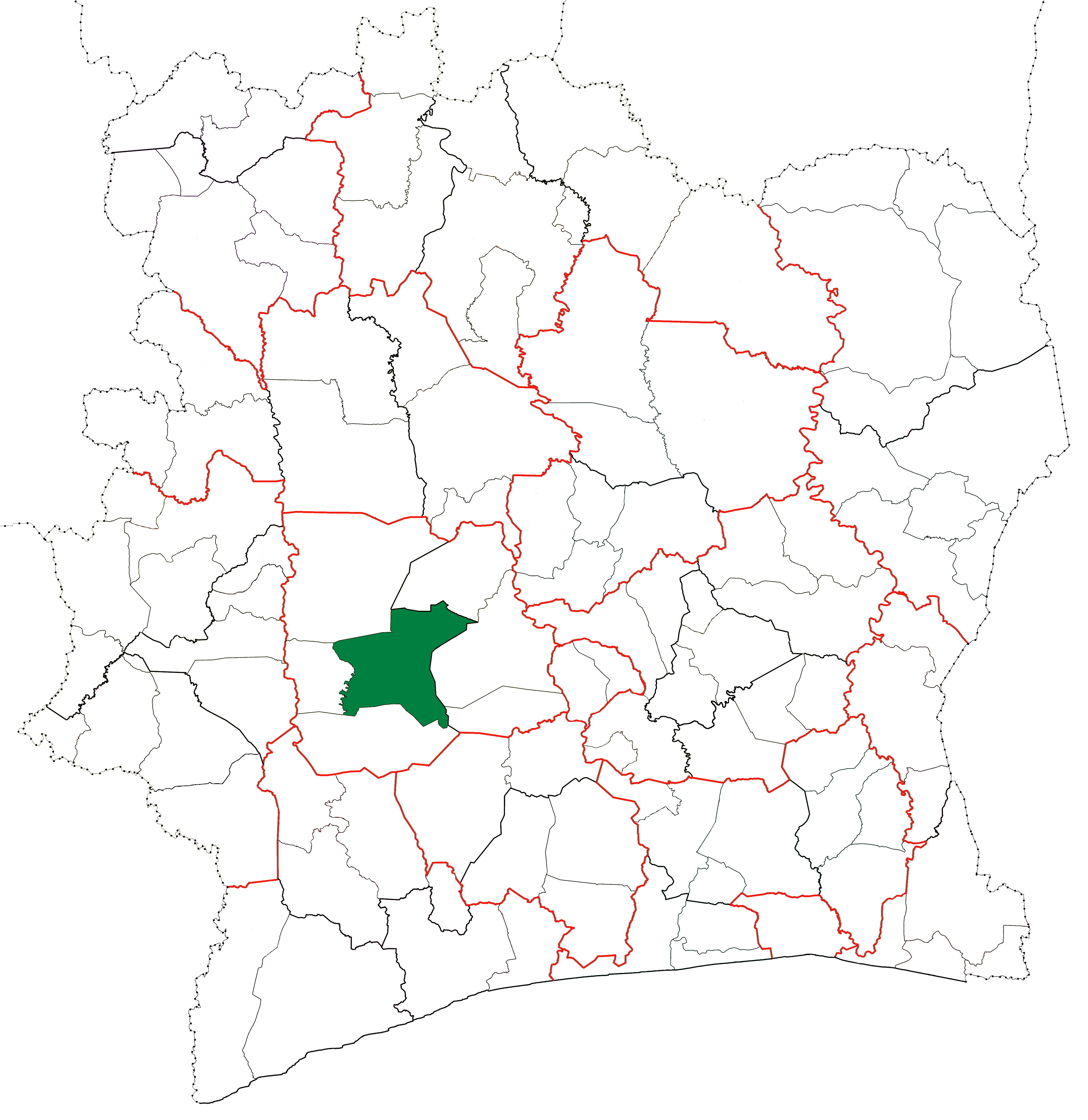
- Location in Ivory Coast. Daloa Department has had these boundaries since 2008.
- Country: Ivory Coast
- District: Sassandra-Marahoué
- Region: Haut-Sassandra
- 1969: Established as a first-level subdivision
- 1980: Divided to create Issia Dept
- 1988: Divided to create Vavoua Dept
- 1997: Converted to a second-level subdivision
- 2008: Divided to create Zoukougbeu Dept
- 2011: Converted to a third-level subdivision
- Departmental seat: Daloa

Government
  - Prefect: Kouamé Brou

Area
  - Total: 3,820 km^{2} (1,470 sq mi)

Population (2021 census)
  - Total: 705,378
  - Density: 185/km^{2} (478/sq mi)
- Time zone: UTC+0 (GMT)

Daloa Department is a department of Haut-Sassandra Region in Sassandra-Marahoué District, Ivory Coast. In 2021, its population was 705,378 and its seat is the settlement of Daloa. The sub-prefectures of the department are Bédiala, Daloa, Gadouan, Gboguhé, Gonaté, and Zaïbo.

== History ==
Daloa Department was created in 1969 as one of the 24 new departments that were created to take the place of the six departments that were being abolished. It was created from territory that was formerly part of Centre-Ouest Department. Using current boundaries as a reference, from 1969 to 1980 the department occupied the same territory as Haut-Sassandra Region.

In 1980, Daloa Department was divided to create Issia Department. What remained was divided again in 1988 to create Vavoua Department.

In 1997, regions were introduced as new first-level subdivisions of Ivory Coast; as a result, all departments were converted into second-level subdivisions. Daloa Department was included as part of Haut-Sassandra Region.

A third division of Daloa Department occurred in 2008, with the creation of Zoukougbeu Department.

In 2011, districts were introduced as new first-level subdivisions of Ivory Coast. At the same time, regions were reorganised and became second-level subdivisions and all departments were converted into third-level subdivisions. At this time, Daloa Department was retained as part of Haut-Sassandra Region in the new Sassandra-Marahoué District.

=== Maps of historical boundaries ===
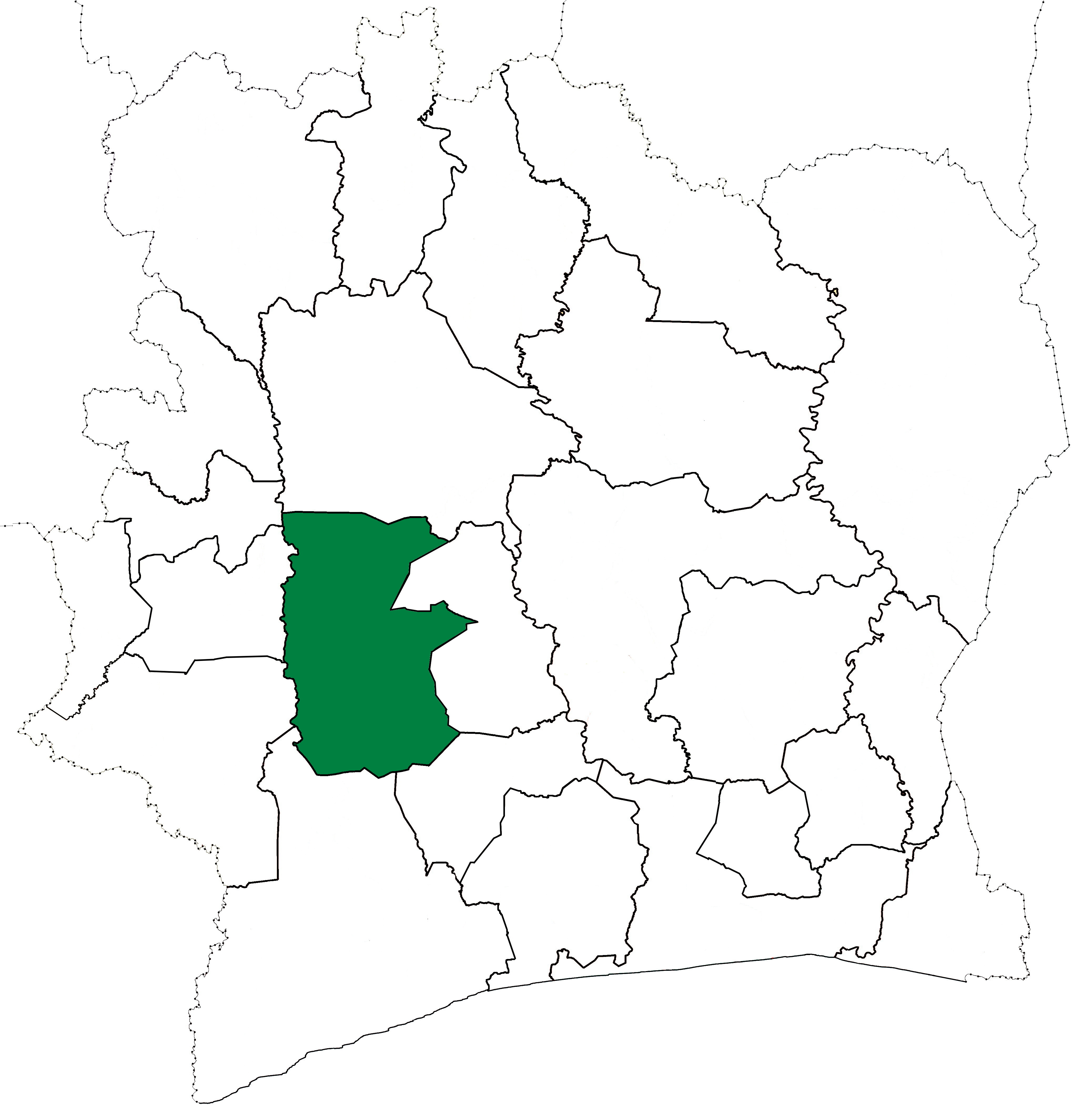
Daloa Department upon its creation in 1969. It kept these boundaries until 1980, but other departments began to be divided in 1974.

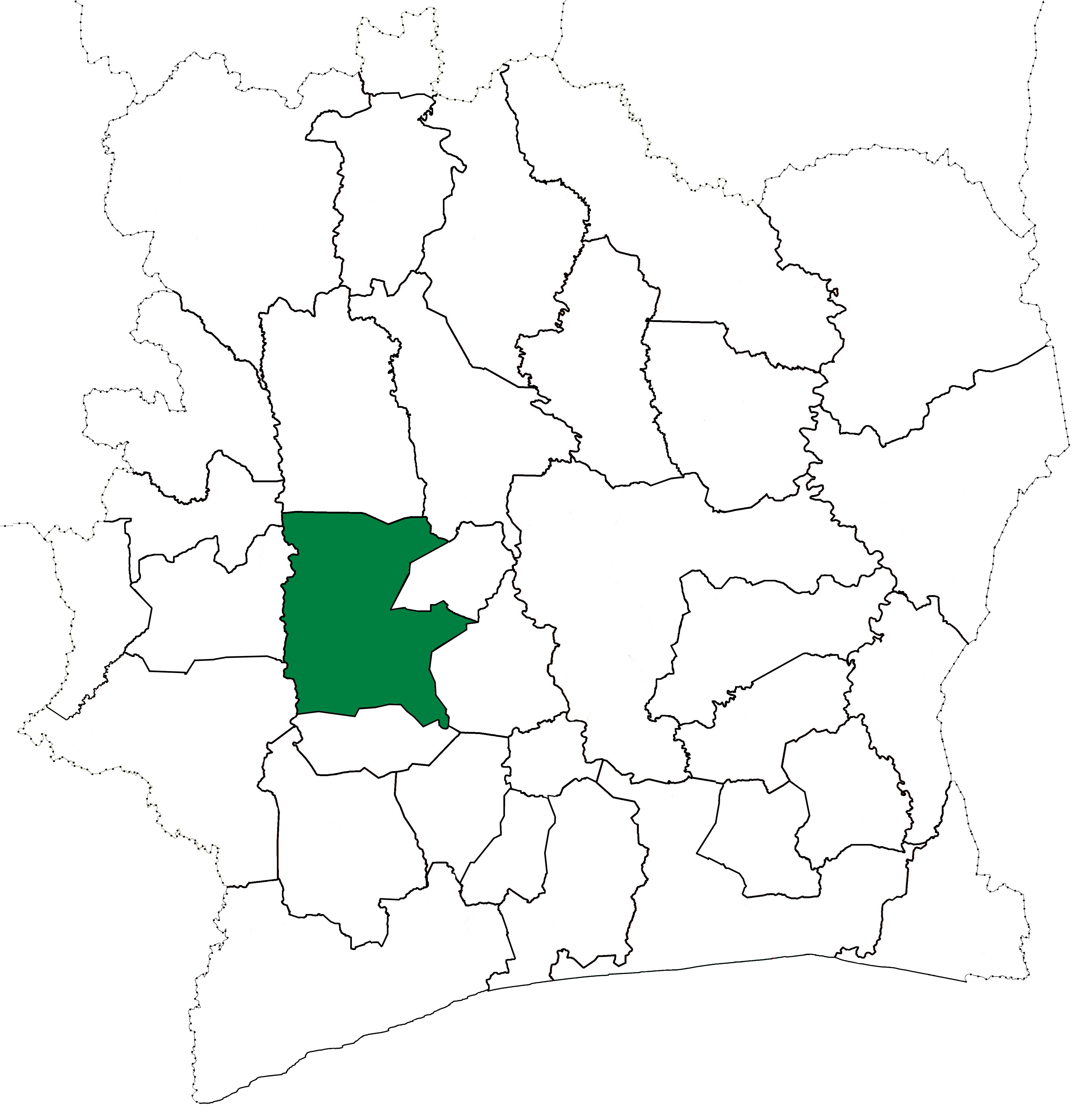
Daloa Department from 1980 to 1988.

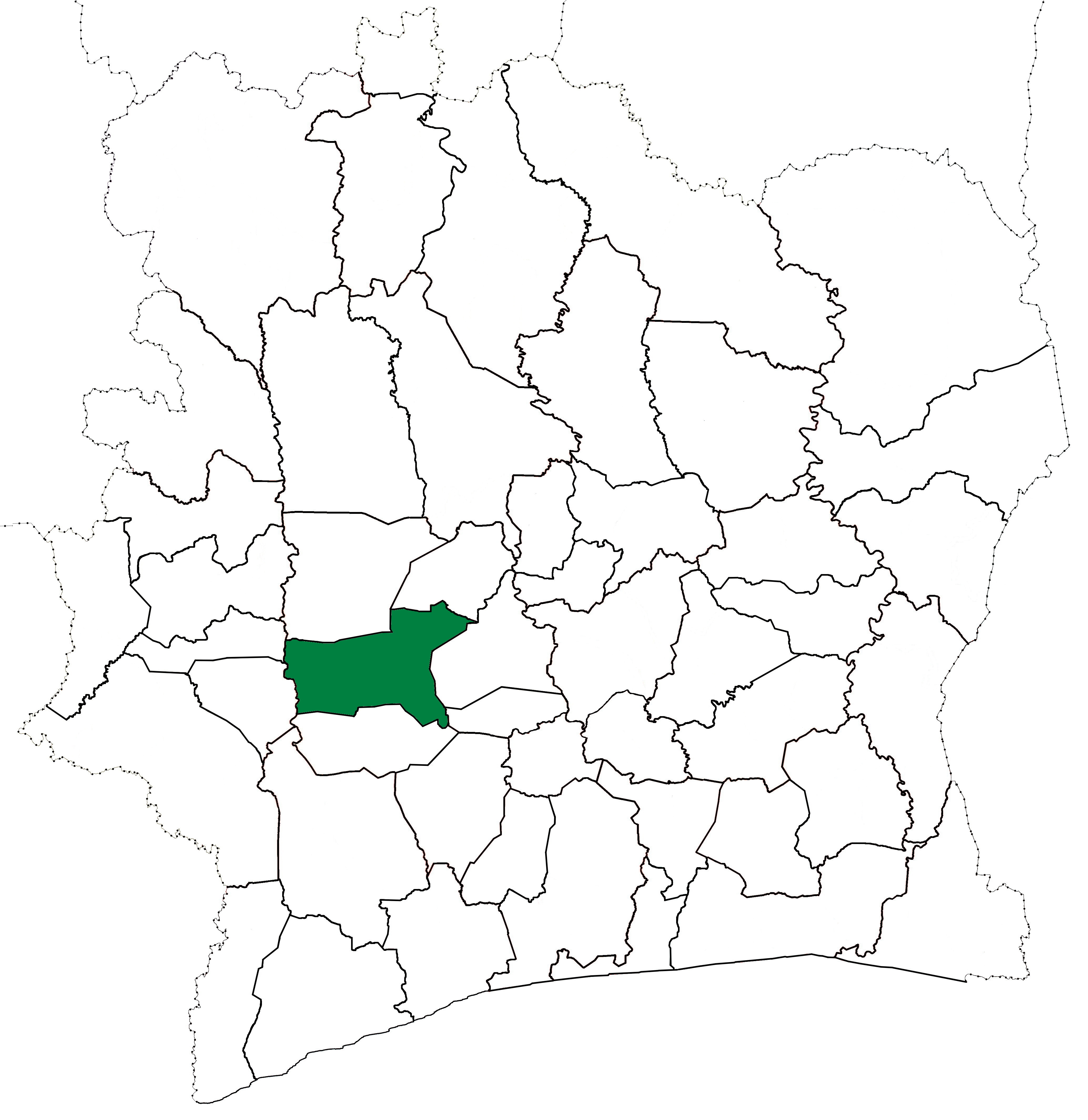
Daloa Department from 1988 to 2008. (Other subdivision boundaries began to change in 1995.)

== Villages ==
- Gnamanou
