= Sassandra-Marahoué District =

District of Ivory Coast

Coordinates: 6°53′N 6°27′W

Sassandra-Marahoué District District du Sassandra-Marahoué
- District
- Country: Ivory Coast
- Established: 2011
- Capital: Daloa

Area
  - Total: 23,950 km^{2} (9,250 sq mi)

Population (2021 census)
  - Total: 2,720,876
  - Density: 113.6/km^{2} (294.2/sq mi)
- HDI (2022): 0.512 low · 9th of 14

Sassandra-Marahoué District (French: District du Sassandra-Marahoué, [sa.sɑ̃d.ʁa ma.ʁa.we]) is one of fourteen administrative districts of Ivory Coast. The district is located in the central part of the country. The capital of the district is Daloa.

== Creation ==
Sassandra-Marahoué District was created in a 2011 administrative reorganisation of the subdivisions of Ivory Coast. The territory of the district was composed by merging the regions of Haut-Sassandra and Marahoué.

== Administrative divisions ==
Sassandra-Marahoué District is currently subdivided into two regions and the following departments:

- Haut-Sassandra Region (region seat also in Daloa)
  - Daloa Department
  - Issia Department
  - Vavoua Department
  - Zoukougbeu Department
- Marahoué Region (region seat in Bouaflé)
  - Bouaflé Department
  - Sinfra Department
  - Zuénoula Department

== Population ==
According to the 2021 census, Sassandra-Marahoué District has a population of 2,720,876, making it the third most populous district in Ivory Coast, behind Abidjan Autonomous District and Montagnes District.

=== Villages ===
- Détroya
- Zébouo-Nord

=== Religion ===
Religion in Sassandra-Marahoué (2021 census)
Religion	Percent
Islam	40.3%
Christianity	38.8%
None	15.0%
Traditional	2.3%
Other	3.6%

Sassandra-Marahoué has a religiously diverse population. According to the 2021 census, Islam is the plurality religion in the district (40.3%), followed by Christianity (38.8%) and those with no religion (15.0%). A smaller share of residents adhere to traditional religions or other faiths.
