= Haut-Sassandra =

Coordinates: 7°0′N 6°30′W

Haut-Sassandra Region Région du Haut-Sassandra
- Region
- Seal
- Motto(s): "Cohésion, travail, développement"
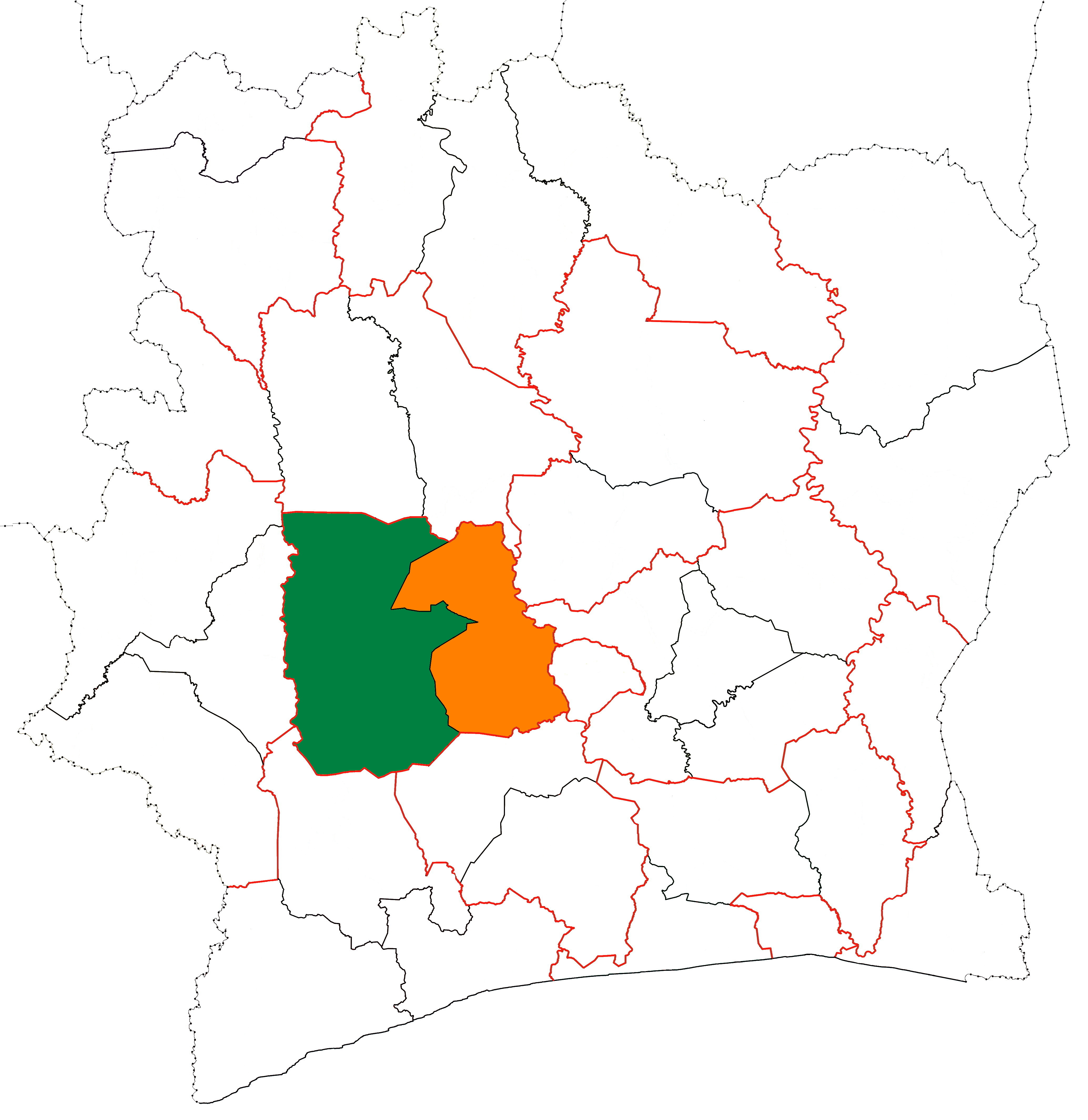
- Location of Haut-Sassandra Region (green) in Ivory Coast and in Sassandra-Marahoué District
- Country: Ivory Coast
- District: Sassandra-Marahoué
- 1997: Established as a first-level subdivision
- 2000: Divided to create Fromager Region
- 2011: Converted to a second-level subdivision
- Regional seat: Daloa

Government
  - Prefect: Kouamé Brou
  - Council President: Alphonse Djedje Mady

Area
  - Total: 15,190 km^{2} (5,860 sq mi)

Population (2021 census)
  - Total: 1,739,697
  - Density: 114.5/km^{2} (296.6/sq mi)
- Time zone: UTC+0 (GMT)
- Website: crhs.ci

Haut-Sassandra Region is one of the 31 regions of Ivory Coast and is one of two regions in Sassandra-Marahoué District. The region's seat is Daloa. The region's area is 15,190 km², and its population in the 2021 census was 1,739,697, making it the most populous region of Ivory Coast.

== Departments and geography ==
Haut-Sassandra is currently divided into four departments: Daloa, Issia, Vavoua, and Zoukougbeu.

The region is traversed by a northwesterly line of equal latitude and longitude.

== History ==
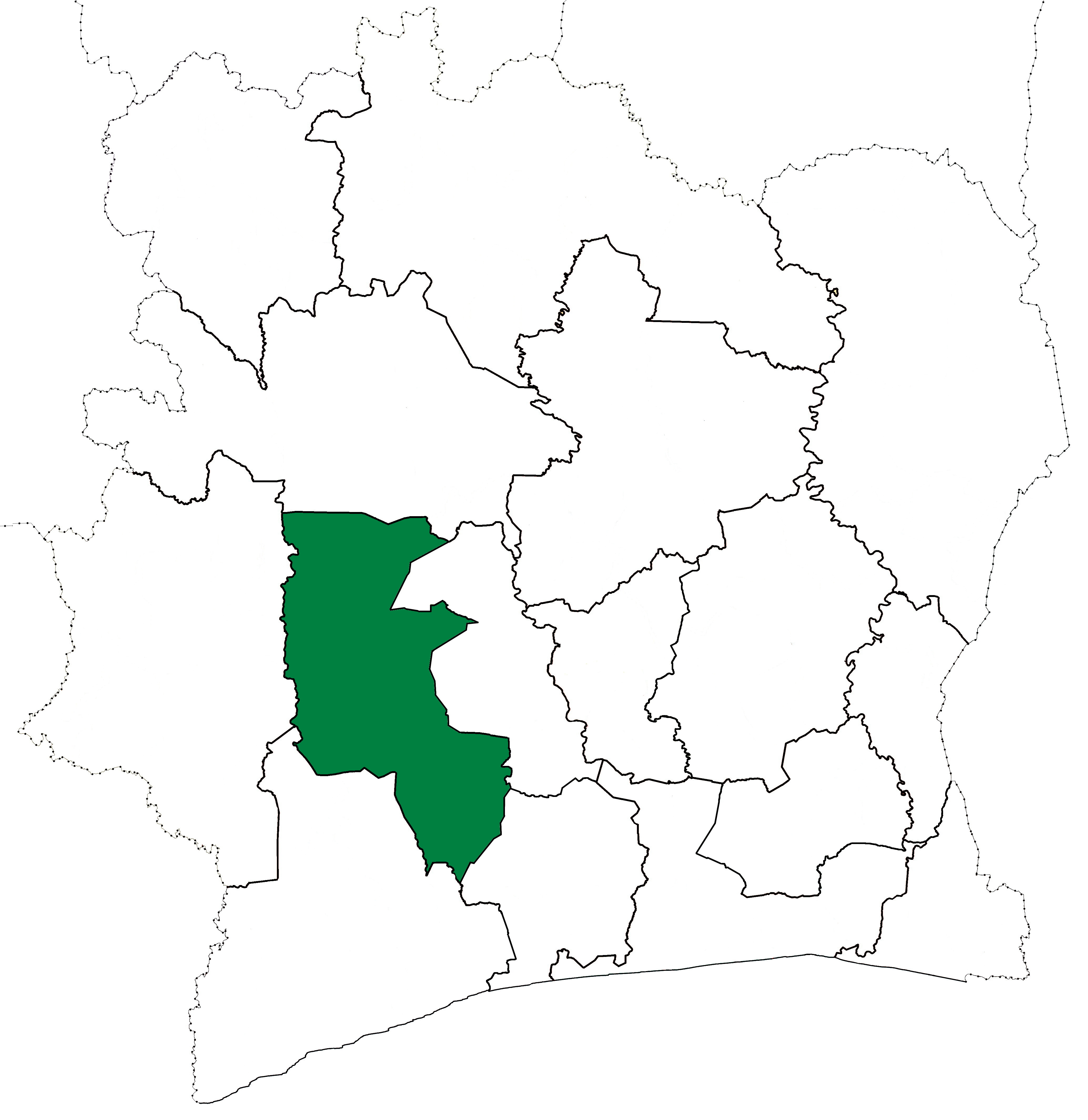
Haut-Sassandra Region upon its creation in 1997. Haut-Sassandra retained these boundaries until 2000, when it and Marahoué Region were divided to create Fromager Region.

Haut-Sassandra Region was created in 1997 as a first-level administrative region of the country. In 2000, Gagnoa Department was split off from Haut-Sassandra and combined with Oumé Department from Marahoué Region to form Fromager Region.

As part of the 2011 administrative reorganisation of the subdivisions of Ivory Coast, Haut-Sassandra was converted into a second-level administrative region and became part of the new first-level Sassandra-Marahoué District. No territorial changes were made to Haut-Sassandra as a result of the reorganisation.
