= Odette Ekra =

Odette Ekra (born Odette Yace) was a female anti-colonial activist in Cote d'Ivoire during the 1940-50s. She was involved in the women’s branch of the PDCI and participated in the Women’s March on Grand-Bassam in December of 1949.

== Historical context ==
Starting in 1830, France began colonizing much of West Africa. Two federations were created: French West Africa (Afrique Occidentale Francaise/AOF) and French Equatorial Africa (Afrique Equatoriale Francaise/ AEF). France used heavy taxation, indigenat, forced labor, and coerced military service to maintain colonial rule. Odette Ekra grew up with these policies, and her life was shaped by them. African resistance increased after World War II. Tensions in AOF came to a head after World War II as Africans who fought for France returned home to restrained economic opportunity. African workers organized into trade unions, to fight back against the poor wages and high inflation. The unions organized a strike of 15,000+ workers in different sectors in Dakar and Saint-Louis, forcing colonial authorities to respond. African political leaders began organizing one political party to unite the French African colonies. In 1946, delegates from AOF and AEF gathered and signed the manifesto of the Rassemblement Démocratique Africain (RDA). The Cote d’Ivoire branch of the RDA, the Parti Démocratique de la Cote d’Ivoire (PDCI) was particularly successful at anticolonial action. The PDCI drew support from Félix Houphouët-Boigny and local farmers. Odette Ekra and other educated women fought alongside men for the formation of the PDCI in Cote d’Ivoire. They appealed directly to Paris officials, putting pressure on local authorities to enforce reforms that passed. This successfully built deep connections in the French political system.

The women of Ivory Coast played a crucial role in the success of the RDA by acting as “public mothers.” “Public motherhood” describes the idea in Africa that women hold a unique form of leadership and power in their communities due to their “symbolic power of childbirth.” Public mothers were meant to support men and help them make decisions. After joining the PDCI cause, women continued this role of mothering, caring for those in prison and raising money for the PDCI. Odette Ekra found her way into the PDCI through her marriage to Mathieu Ekra, a prominent member of the PDCI. Women were kept at an arm’s length in the PDCI, but after the French started to jail RDA members the women began to “awaken” and in 1949, formed their own wing of the PDCI. Odette Ekra was one of the women who helped to form the women’s branch of the PDCI after her husband was imprisoned at Grand-Bassam. The women visited imprisoned PDCI members, held mass demonstrations, and traveled around Cote d’Ivoire recruiting, doubling the PDCI’s membership from 1948-1949. Odette Ekra was involved in spreading the message of the party in the language of native groups, instead of French. One strictly feminine form of protest was adjanou. Adjanou was a dancing ritual utilized by women to both shame men for their wrongdoings and also to support male allies in times of war. During protests of colonialism, the women of Cote d’Ivoire used adjanou to both support their husbands and sons in their fight, but also to bring ridicule to colonial authorities.

== Notable events ==
One of the most famous women’s protests in Cote d’Ivoire was the Women's March on Grand Bassam prison in December of 1949. After a year of imprisonment, PDCI members were no closer to trial or release. Odette Ekra’s husband was among the imprisoned. PDCI women determined they had to protest. Odette Ekra went along with 2,000 other women to protest at the prison in Grand Bassam. The women were bold in their action and went along “singing, dancing, and shouting vulgarities at the gendarmes, they fiercely defended their position. In the face of demands that they halt their protest, the women responded only with insults, calling officials names like ‘dirty white man, colonialist, bastard,’ and the like.” This protest also included adjanou. Colonial authorities used violent tactics to break up the women, and they left after Félix Houphouet-Boigny negotiated with the guards. Women played a large role in gaining support for the PDCI and carrying on when the men were jailed and showing strength in the face of oppression.

== Legacy ==
Odette Ekra was the sister of Phillippe Yace, a PDCI leader, and was also married to another leader of the PDCI, yet little is known about her. Many of the other women who orchestrated and participated in the Women’s March on Grand-Bassam remain nameless or lack documentation of their lives beyond their names. The Women’s March on Grand-Bassam is celebrated as a show of Cote d’Ivoire citizens' refusal to give up and a statue of Anne-Marie Raggi, Marie Kore and Odette Ekra is located at Peace Roundabout and depicts them on the march to Grand-Bassam. Odette Ekra, along with the other women involved in the march, are celebrated as independence fighters and used as political references in Cote d’Ivoire.
