= Célestine Ouezzin Coulibaly =

Burkina Faso politician (died 1997)

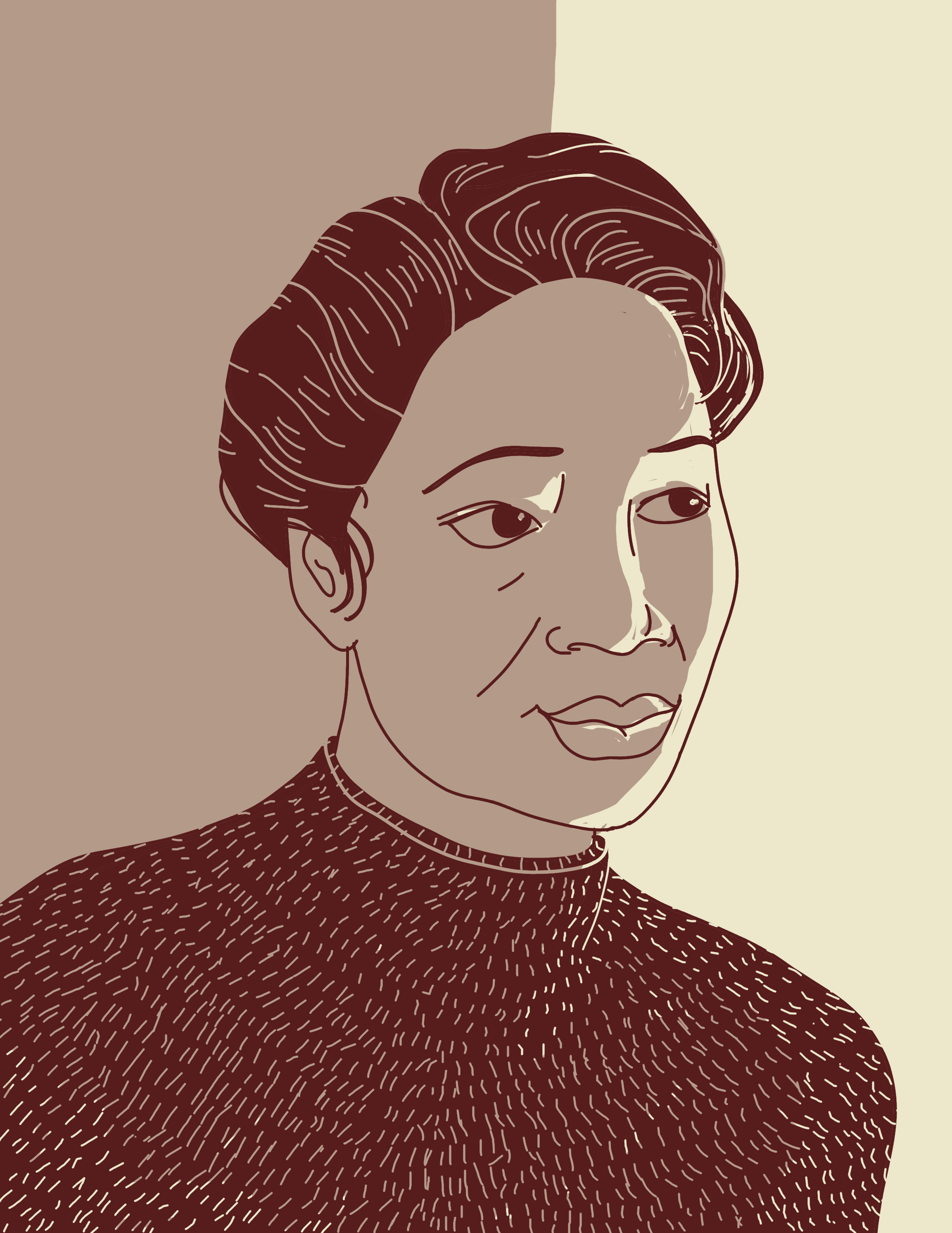
- Drawing depicting Célestine Ouezzin Coulibaly

Minister of Social Affairs, Housing and Employment
- In office 24 October 1958 – 1959

Personal details
- Born: Macoucou Traoré; 1914
- Died: 1997 (aged 82–83)
- Spouse: Daniel Ouezzin Coulibaly (m. 1930)

Makoukou Célestine Ouezzin Coulibaly-Traoré (born Macoucou Traoré; 1914–1997) was an anti-colonial leader in French West Africa. She helped to set up the women's section of the Rassemblement Démocratique Africain in Côte d'Ivoire and Upper Volta, becoming its secretary general in 1948. In 1958, she was appointed Upper Volta's Minister of Social Affairs, probably making her the first woman to join a cabinet in any of the French-speaking West African governments.

== Biography ==
Ouezzin Coulibaly was believed to have been born in 1914 in the Banfora region of today's Burkina Faso, then known as Upper Volta. Known at birth as Makoukou (or Macoucou) Traoré, she was the daughter of Balla Traoré, who was chief of the Sindou Canton. Her education culminated in a teaching diploma and she worked as a primary school teacher. In 1930, she married Daniel Ouezzin Coulibaly, obtaining the name Célestine in 1931 when she and her husband were baptized as Roman Catholics.

Ouezzin Coulibaly helped to set up the women's section of the Rassemblement Démocratique Africain in Côte d'Ivoire and Upper Volta, becoming its secretary general in 1948. Ouezzin Coulibaly was one of those who led some 1,500 women in a march to the prison at Grand-Bassam on 24 December 1949, calling for the release of their husbands who, as members of the PDCI-RDA independence movement, had been jailed without trial by the French colonial authorities. Together with fellow leaders Anne-Marie Raggi, Marguérite Sacoum, Odette Yacé and Marie Koré, she can therefore be considered one of the pioneers of the independence of the Ivory Coast.

In December 1949, Ouezzin Coulibaly attended the anti-imperialist Asian Women’s Conference held in Beijing, China. After returning home at the beginning of 1950, she toured Sudan, Upper Volta, and the Ivory Coast to share what she had learned from communist women in the People’s Republic of China.

On 24 October 1958, Ouezzin Coulibaly was appointed Upper Volta's Minister of Social Affairs, Housing and Employment. Her appointment, the first for a woman in French West Africa, seemed to be a promising development. It was not, however, quite as revolutionary as it might have seemed as it occurred only six weeks after the death of her husband, who had been President of the Council in Upper Volta. Although his death probably played an important part in her appointment, as a trained schoolteacher and one of the country's few literate women, she was fully qualified for the position.

After Coulibaly left the position in 1959, despite becoming the first female member of the national assembly, the fact that she did not obtain a government post after Upper Volta's independence in 1960 could be considered a backward step for the political role of women. Representing Upper Volta, Ouezzin Coulibaly was elected to the senate of the French Community on 30 April 1959 where she sat on the Committee for Transport and Telecommunications. She held the position until 16 March 1961.
