= Hermankono-Diès =

- Village
- Location in Ivory Coast
- Coordinates: 5°35′N 5°22′W
- Country: Ivory Coast
- District: Gôh-Djiboua
- Region: Lôh-Djiboua
- Department: Guitry
- Sub-prefecture: Dairo-Didizo
- Time zone: UTC+0 (GMT)

Hermankono-Diès is a village in southern Ivory Coast. It is in the sub-prefecture of Dairo-Didizo, Guitry Department, Lôh-Djiboua Region, Gôh-Djiboua District.

Hermankono-Diès was a commune until March 2012, when it became one of 1,126 communes nationwide that were abolished.
