= Brihiri =

Brihiri Béhiri
- Village
- Location in Ivory Coast
- Coordinates: 5°40′N 5°29′W
- Country: Ivory Coast
- District: Gôh-Djiboua
- Region: Lôh-Djiboua
- Department: Guitry
- Sub-prefecture: Dairo-Didizo
- Time zone: UTC+0 (GMT)

Brihiri (also spelled Béhiri) is a village in southern Ivory Coast. It is in the sub-prefecture of Dairo-Didizo, Guitry Department, Lôh-Djiboua Region, Gôh-Djiboua District.

Brihiri was a commune until March 2012, when it became one of 1,126 communes nationwide that were abolished.
