= Women in the decolonisation of Africa =

Nationalist and independence movements throughout Africa have been predominantly led by men; however, women also held important roles. Women's roles in African independence movements were diverse and varied by each country. Many women believed that their liberation was directly linked to the liberation of their countries. Women participated in various anti-colonial roles, ranging from grassroots organising to providing crucial support during the struggle for independence. Their activities included organising protests, distributing anti-colonial propaganda, and offering vital assistance such as food and medical care to injured guerrilla soldiers. Additionally, some women actively engaged in frontline combat alongside their male counterparts. Women involved in anti-colonial efforts frequently encountered violent opposition from colonial authorities, resulting in incidents of imprisonment and torture, as consequences for their participation in such endeavors. Despite the significant contributions and hardships endured by women during the decolonisation process, their roles in the struggle for independence across the continent have often been overlooked in historical accounts. In many mainstream African history narratives, women's contributions remain largely invisible or misrepresented, leading to a lack of recognition compared to their male counterparts.

== Algeria ==
Lalla Fatma N'Soumer (Kabyle: Lalla Faḍma n Sumer; Tifinagh: ⴼⴰⴹⵎⴰ ⵏ ⵙⵓⵎⵔ; c. 1830 – 1863) was a Kabyle anti-colonial leader during 1849–1857 of the French conquest of Algeria. She led several battles against the French forces, until her capture in July 1857. She was imprisoned until her death six years later.

While there is some dispute over who exactly designed flag, Émilie Busquant, wife of the Algerian nationalist leader Messali Hadj, is generally credited as having sewed the first version of the Algerian flag in 1934.

=== Algerian War ===
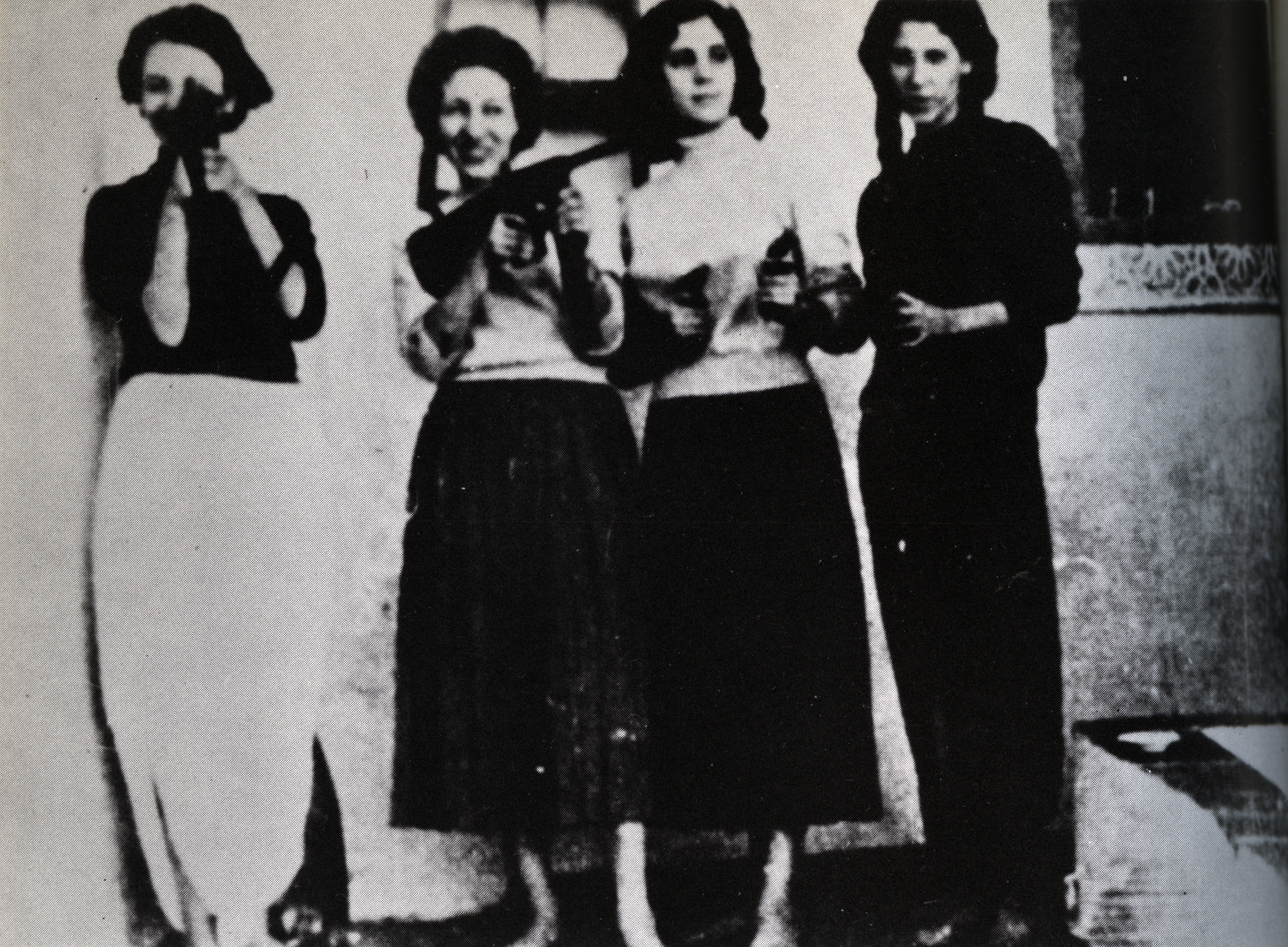
FLN female bombers

Women participated in a variety of roles during the Algerian War. The majority of Muslim women who became active participants did so on the side of the National Liberation Front (FLN). The French included some women, both Muslim and French, in their war effort, but they were not as fully integrated, nor were they charged with the same breadth of tasks as the women on the Algerian side. The total number of women involved in the conflict, as determined by post-war veteran registration, is numbered at 11,000, but it is possible that this number was significantly higher due to underreporting.

Urban and rural women's experiences in the revolution differed greatly. Urban women, who constituted about twenty percent of the overall force, had received some kind of education and usually chose to enter on the side of the FLN of their own accord. Largely illiterate rural women, on the other hand, the remaining eighty percent, due to their geographic location in respect to the operations of FLN often became involved in the conflict as a result of proximity paired with force.

Women operated in a number of different areas during the course of the rebellion. "Women participated actively as combatants, spies, fundraisers, as well as nurses, launderers, and cooks", "women assisted the male fighting forces in areas like transportation, communication and administration" the range of involvement by a woman could include both combatant and non-combatant roles. Eveline Safir Lavalette was a notable contributor to the Revolution as a distributor of pamphlets for the FLN's underground newspaper. While most women's tasks were non-combatant, their less frequent, violent acts were more noticed. The reality was that "rural women in maquis rural areas support networks" contained the overwhelming majority of those who participated; female combatants were in the minority.

Perhaps the most famous incident involving Algerian women revolutionaries was the Milk Bar Café bombing of 1956, when Zohra Drif and Yacef Saâdi planted three bombs: one in the Air France office in the Mauritania building in Algiers, which did not explode, one in a cafeteria on the Rue Michelet, and another at the Milk Bar Café, which killed three young women and injured multiple adults and children. Algerian Communist Party member Raymonde Peschard was initially accused of being an accomplice to the bombing and was forced to flee from the colonial authorities. In September 1957, though, Drif and Saâdi were arrested and sentenced to twenty years hard labor in the Barbarossa prison. Drif was pardoned by Charles de Gaulle when Algeria gained independence in 1962.

== Ghana ==
Yaa Asantewaa I (1840 – 1921) was the Queen Mother of Ejisu in the Ashanti Empire, now part of modern-day Ghana. In 1900, she led the Ashanti war, also known as the War of the Golden Stool or the Yaa Asantewaa War of Independence, against the British Empire.

Nana Yaa Asantewaa understood the ramifications of British colonial rule. She is seen by Ghanaians today as a queen mother who exercised her political and social right to help defend her kingdom. The role she played in influencing the Ashanti men to battle the British appears to be a function of her matriarchal status. The Ashanti people are organized in a matrilineal system, where lineage is traced through women who descend from a common female ancestor. The Ashanti believe a person's blood comes from the mother and spirit comes from the father. The queen mother was the sister of the chief and was the head of kinship relations. Yaa Asantewaa's status and warrior spirit led the Ashanti people during a time of uncertainty. Nana Yaa Asantewaa's call to the women of the Asante Empire is rooted in the political obligations of Akan women and their significant roles in legislative and judicial processes. The hierarchy of male stools among the Akan people was complemented by their female counterparts. Within the village, elders who were heads of the matrilineages (mpanyimfo), constituted the village council known as the ôdekuro. The women, known as the mpanyinfo, referred to as aberewa or ôbaa panyin, were responsible for looking after women's affairs. For every ôdekuro, an ôbaa panyin acted as the responsible party for the affairs of the women of the village and served as a member of the village council.

The head of a division, the ôhene, and the head of the autonomous political community, the Amanhene, had their female counterparts known as the ôhemaa: a female ruler who sat on their councils. The ôhemaa and ôhene were all of the same mogya, blood or localized matrilineage. The Asantehemaa, the occupant of the female stool in the Kumasi state, played a crucial role in the united Asante. As her male counterpart served as an ex-officio member of the Asantehene's council, she was also a member of the Kôtôkô Council, which acts as the executive committee or cabinet of the Asanteman Nhyiamu, the General Assembly of Asante rulers. Female stool occupants participated not only in the judicial and legislative processes, but also in the making and unmaking of war, and the distribution of land.

== Nigeria ==
Nigeria was granted independence from the British Empire on 1 October 1960. Before this, various forms and demonstrations against colonial rule took place. Women in Nigeria played a significant role during the movement for national independence. Before independence, women organized through movements like the Abeokuta Women's Revolt and the Women's War.

=== Margaret Ekpo ===
Margaret Ekpo was one of the most important female independence leaders in Nigeria. She worked toward more equitable civil rights and Nigerian independence.

Margaret Ekpo was a chief, a politician, and a nationalist independence leader. In 1945, Ekpo became involved in politics after her husband, Dr. John Udo Ekpo, became dissatisfied with the colonial administration's treatment of indigenous Nigerian doctors. In British-ruled Nigeria, colonial rulers had concentrated the power on male chiefs. After the Women's War, she and other women were appointed to replace warrant chiefs. Ekpo was later appointed to the Eastern House of Chiefs in 1954. As a chief, she rallied women of different ethnic identities to demand women's rights and independence. She was arrested multiple times for instigating these rallies against British colonization. As a warrant chief, Ekpo passed a law that required police to employ more women in Enugu and Lagos.

Before WWII, Ekpo led the Aba Market Women Association in mobilizing women against colonial rule and patriarchal oppression. Following WWII, Ekpo and the Aba Market Women Association continued to mobilize using tactics such as buying up large quantities of scarce commodities and selling them only to registered members of the association who attended meetings regularly. She used this as an opportunity to educate women on the importance of independence and decolonisation.

I would tell the women, do you know that your daughter can be the matron of that hospital? Do you know that your husband can be a District Officer (D.O.) or Resident? Do you know that if you join hands with us in the current political activities, your children could one day live in European quarters? I used to tell them these things every time and so they became interested...

After being granted independence in 1960, Ekpo participated in the Constitutional Conferences in Lagos and London. Ekpo would also serve as a member of parliament in Nigeria from 1960 to 1966. Ekpo's work also transcended national politics. Shetravelledout of Nigeria to represent Nigerian women at several international conferences such as the Inter-Parliamentary Union Conference (1964) and the World Women's International Domestic Federation Conference (1963).

Along with her work in advocating civil and political rights, Ekpo left a legacy that notably lacked ethnic bias in a country where many forms of ethnicism and nepotism existed in politics.

== Tanzania ==
Late in 1961, the predecessor state of Tanganyika was established through the Tanganyika Independence Act of 1961. This act ended British rule and established self-government. A new republican constitution was adopted one year later, in December 1962. This abolished the remaining role of the British monarchy in Tanganyika. A union with the neighbouring state of Zanzibar in 1964 led to the formation of the Republic of Tanzania.

=== Bibi Titi Mohamed ===
Bibi Titi Mohamed was a prominent figure in African women's politics and the independence movement in Tanganyika, mobilizing women to join the Tanganyika African National Union (TANU) political party.

Born in Dar es Salaam, Bibi Titi rose to prominence unexpectedly. Having only four years of primary school education before her political career, she was a housewife and lead singer in a “Bamba'' group. However, as the struggle for freedom amplified, Bibi Titi found a more active role in politics. She joined the Tanganyika African National Union (TANU) in 1954. Doing so, Bibi Titi became TANU's first female member. She advocated for political freedom as well as the autonomy of women. By the end of the 1950s, Bibi Titi had become a prominent and powerful voice in politics, campaigning on behalf of freedom and development. After gaining popularity, her voice became a powerful source of African feminist and anti-colonial sentiment.

After the establishment of the Republic of Tanzania in 1964, she represented the constituency of Rufiji in Parliament. She also served as a member of TANU's Central Committee and executive committee. There, she continued to advocate for greater freedom and women's rights.

Bibi Titi left a legacy that calls on women to have greater self-respect and encourages women to strive for more education and equal treatment. In a speech, Bibi Titi implored women to take advantage of their latent political influence saying:

I told you [women] that we want independence. And we can’t get independence if you don’t want to join the party. We have given birth to all these men. Women are the power in this world. We are the ones who give birth to the world…

== Kenya ==
On December 12, 1963, Kenya declared independence from Britain after years of anti-colonial efforts involving both men and women. Women, in particular, played significant yet often underappreciated roles in various struggles against colonial rule, including active participation in the Mau Mau Rebellion.

In various colonial records, Kikuyu women have frequently been portrayed as victims of the Mau Mau rebellion, a portrayal often utilised by the British government to validate stringent measures and portray themselves as protectors. Women's roles in the rebellion extended beyond mere victimhood; they were active participants motivated by various factors. Various colonial laws, including communal labor and the hut and poll taxes, were perceived as disproportionately affecting women, leading to resentment within the female population. This resentment, coupled with other grievances such as unfair labor practices and limited political representation, motivated many women to align themselves with Mau Mau fighters.

The roles undertaken by women in the Mau Mau rebellion were diverse and complex. Kikuyu women played crucial roles in organising and sustaining supply lines that facilitated the delivery of essential resources such as food, medicine, weapons, and information to the rebel forces. Additionally, women served as recruiters, actively identifying and enlisting capable fighters to join the cause. Notably, women themselves participated as combatants, particularly in the forest forces, where they undertook various camp duties including cooking, cleaning, gathering firewood, and transporting water. These multifaceted contributions underscored the integral role of women in supporting and actively participating in the Mau Mau movement. Their roles were deemed significant by the British government, which acknowledged their vital function as the "eyes and ears" of the Mau Mau movement. During the rebellion, several Kikuyu woman were sexually assaulted and raped by British security forces, including the Kikuyu Home Guard.

The identities of many women involved in the Mau Mau rebellion have remained unrecorded. While some notable figures, like Field-Marshal Muthoni wa Kirima, have gained recognition for their roles as top-ranking female fighters, there are thousands of women whose names have not been documented or acknowledged:

=== Wambui wa Kanyari ===
Wambui wa Kanyari, also known as Matron, is a female leader within the Mau Mau movement. Originating from the Ngerwe village of Ngariama, she gained recognition from her role in the resistance against colonial authorities.

Within the Mau Mau administrative structure, Wambui wa Kanyari held a pivotal role in the Department of Medicine. As a trained nurse, she provided essential medical care to Mau Mau rebels in the forest. Matron's role encompassed various tasks within healthcare provision, such as sterilising syringes, administering medications, and tending to the medical requirements of fighters. Beyond medical duties, she extended support to pregnant women seeking sanctuary in the forest, many of whom had endured traumatic incidents like rape or imprisonment. Matron aided in childbirth, serving as a midwife for women delivering babies while in concealment.

Furthermore, Matron played a crucial role in nursing injured women, offering care and support to those who had sustained gunshot wounds or other injuries during confrontations with colonial forces. While specific details about Matron's life may vary in historical records, her contributions exemplify the vital role that women played within the Mau Mau movement. Her dedication to providing medical care and support to fellow rebels underscores the resilience and solidarity that characterised the struggle for independence in Kenya.

=== Bandi wa Kamau ===
Bandi wa Kamau was a notable figure in the Mau Mau rebellion, contributing significantly to the movement as a rebel. Her involvement included providing support to Mau Mau soldiers by bringing them food while they operated in the forests. Additionally, in 1953, she played a pivotal role in safeguarding the Mau Mau oath, demonstrating her commitment to the cause.

One aspect of Bandi wa Kamau's role was her involvement in persuading other women to attend the oathing sessions, where new recruits pledged allegiance to the Mau Mau movement. This was a delicate task, as it required navigating traditional customs that discouraged women from participating in ritualistic ceremonies. Bandi's efforts to involve women in the oathing process were aimed at maintaining cultural sensitivities while also bolstering support for the rebellion.

== Côte d'Ivoire ==
Côte d'Ivoire, located on the southeastern coast of West Africa, gained independence from France in August, 1960. Leading up to independence, women played active roles in various political movements, including the Parti Démocratique de la Côte d'Ivoire — Rassemblement Démocratique Africain (PDCI-RDA), contributing to the country's progress towards self-governance. Their involvement in these movements stemmed from diverse motivations.

Many women were motivated to join the PDCI due to grievances related to forced labor, a central aspect of discontentment under colonial rule. In northern Côte d'Ivoire, where much of French recruitment took place, women experienced disruption to their lives through labor conscription. Witnessing their children sent southward to European plantations and experiencing labor recruitment firsthand further fueled their dissatisfaction.

The increasing repression by the colonial state, marked by the imprisonment of male relatives, spurred militant mothers to engage in more visible activism. Consequently, the women's wing of the PDCI was formed in May 1949, drawing around 15,000 women from various ethnicities, socioeconomic backgrounds, and educational levels. These women played crucial roles within the party, offering vital support to those detained by French authorities, particularly at the overcrowded and deteriorating Grand Bassam prison. Despite difficult circumstances, they ensured that incarcerated activists received necessities such as food, clean clothing, and emotional comfort.

Women actively promoted the party's message and garnered support across the colony, despite literacy challenges. Their dedication was evident through activities like selling RDA membership cards and organising fundraisers, which significantly boosted the party's membership to over 800,000 by December 1949. A key moment in their activism was the December 24, 1949 march on Grand Bassam prison, where two thousand women protested the detention of PDCI militants, marking a significant event in West African women's resistance against French colonial rule and advocating for detainee liberation.

== See also ==
- African feminism
- List of women who led a revolt or rebellion
- Uprisings led by women
- Women in Africa
- Women in the Arab Spring
- Women's March on Grand-Bassam
