= Broudoukou-Penda =

- Village
- Location in Ivory Coast
- Coordinates: 5°31′N 5°31′W
- Country: Ivory Coast
- District: Gôh-Djiboua
- Region: Lôh-Djiboua
- Department: Guitry
- Sub-prefecture: Dairo-Didizo
- Time zone: UTC+0 (GMT)

Broudoukou-Penda is a village in southern Ivory Coast. It is in the sub-prefecture of Dairo-Didizo, Guitry Department, Lôh-Djiboua Region, Gôh-Djiboua District.

Broudoukou-Penda was a commune until March 2012, when it became one of 1,126 communes nationwide that were abolished.
