= Essy =

Essy could be a first name, a middle name, or a surname. Notable people with this name include:

- Essy Persson (born 1941), Swedish film actress
- Anne-Marie Essy Raggi (1918–2004), Ivorian activist
- Amara Essy (1944–2025), Ivorian diplomat and politician
