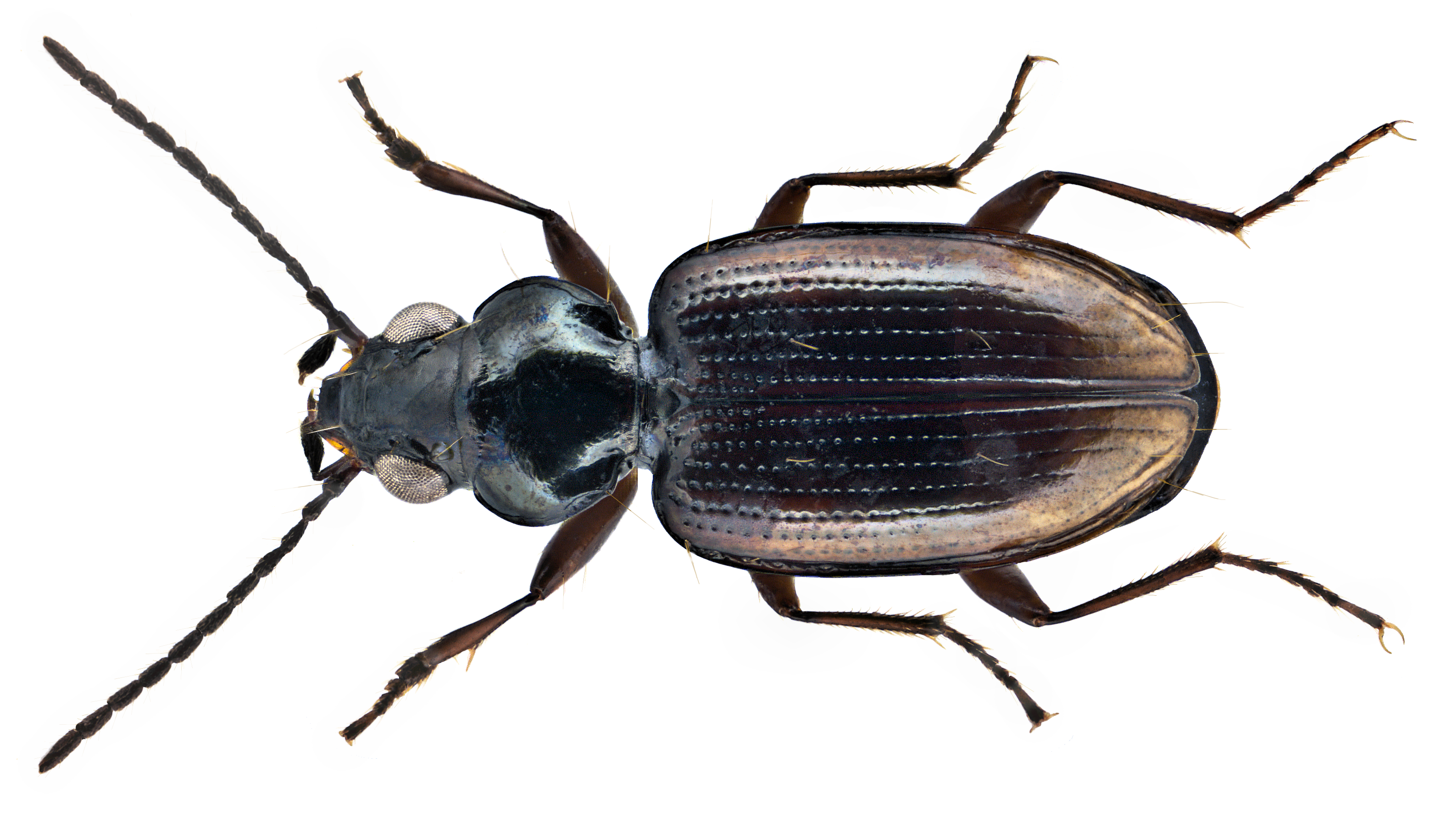

Scientific classification
- Kingdom: Animalia
- Phylum: Arthropoda
- Class: Insecta
- Order: Coleoptera
- Suborder: Adephaga
- Family: Carabidae
- Genus: Bembidion
- Species: B. lunulatum

Binomial name
- Bembidion lunulatum (Geoffroy in Fourcroy, 1785)

= Bembidion lunulatum =

Species of beetle

Bembidion lunulatum is a species of ground beetle native to Europe.
