= Medical education in France =

Medical education in France is administered by departments within universities called Unités de formation et de recherche de médecine (UFR) (Medical Training and Research Units). The training takes a minimum of ten years after the baccalauréat and concludes with a clinical thesis defence. Upon the successful presentation of their thesis, the medical student is awarded a diplôme d'études spécialisées (DES), based on their specialty. Certain high-achievers are awarded a diplôme d'études spécialisées complémentaire (DESC).

French medical training is one of the longest schooling paths in French higher education. It consists of both theoretical and practical training, starting from being more theoretical, moving to more practical aspects as training progresses.

== History ==
=== Rennaissance ===
Medical instruction in France initially developed outside of any institutional framework, but in the 13th century universities in Paris, Toulouse and Montpelier began a form of institutional training in medicine. Montpelier's is the oldest continually-running medical university in the world.

=== 18th century ===
Under the Ancien Régime, medicine was one of four faculties and generally only accessible through the Faculté des Arts de Paris. Teaching was mostly theoretical and involved lectures and reading of authoritative texts. Until the French Revolution in 1789, doctors and surgeons were considered to be separate professions. Doctors' experience was more abstract, learned from lectures and books, and was based on the theories of Galen. Surgeons' experience was practical and they were known as barber surgeons.

The university system was abolished in 1793 and replaced the following year by four medical schools in Paris, Montpelier, Bordeaux and Strasbourg.

=== 19th century ===
In 1802 established a scholarship system for students from any part of France who qualified through a competitive exam. These students would have begun their studies in universities, but would live at and serve internships from then in hospitals and go on to make up the medical elite. Students began neglecting the university exams to devote themselves to preparation for the internship exams because this was the only clinical experience they could get. During this time, hospitals became more prestigious than medical schools.

The law of 19 Ventôse année XI (March 10, 1803) reorganized the profession and stipulated that "no one can henceforth practice medicine or surgery without having been a doctor" except for health officers (Officier de santé) in rural, medically under-served areas. Officiers de santé were like physician assistants or barefoot doctors and qualified through either 6 years apprenticeship with a doctor, 5 years apprenticeship in a hospital or 3 years at a medical school. They were licensed to practice by juries of medical doctors in their area. They were limited to basic and mid-level procedures, barred by law from practicing advanced medicine. With the creation of the University of France in 1808, medical schools reopened their faculties and expanded across France. At this time, the hospital became more prestigious than the medical school. Doctors, working part-time as volunteers, had great autonomy and used the work to build up their private practices. Gradually, a hierarchy evolved with prestigious doctors directing important services at the apex above specialists in private practice, with the general practitioners at the base.

=== 20th century ===
Hospital reforms in 1958 merged the teaching functions of hospitals and universities, creating the position of University Professor and Hospital Practitioner Professeur des universités-praticien hospitalier (PUPH), a full-time hospital/university teacher, as well as teaching hospitals. One goal of the reforms was to reduce the number of elite graduates moving to private practice.

Following the events of the May 1968 protests in France, practical training entrance restrictions were removed: all medical students received practical training. Practical and theoretical training were finally combined into a single course, based on the 1958 ideal of the Centre Hospitalier Universitaire en France Following the Faure reform, medical colleges were integrated into universities as UER (from 1984, research and teaching centres "UFR").

This reform, along with the general population increase, led to a large surge in student numbers. In 1971 this resulted in a fixed number of training places in exams at the end of the first year of medical studies, a Numerus clausus system.

Until the 1990s, any doctor could become a specialist, either by taking the selective hospital residential pathway, or by taking the open access university pathway resulting in a lower-status certificate of specialized studies (THESE). The result was a two-speed medical system, divided between THESE graduates and “former interns” and “former senior hospital registrars”. A reform dropped the THESE medical certificates, returning to obligatory internships for the “ordinal qualification” specialists, through diplomas of specialized studies (OF) to supplement the diploma of Doctor of Medicine. Interns were required to spend part of their training in a non-academic “peripheral hospital” belonging to a regional hospital centre (CHR).

=== Recent changes ===
Until 2004, future general practitioners did not take entrance exams for internships. Their second cycle was followed by a two and a half year “résidanat” (three years for residents starting in or after 2001). In 2004, a new reform was applied, stating that all medical students must pass the national classifying examination. The résidanat was replaced with an internship in general medicine, helping to raise the status of general practice as a profession.

Since the 2010 academic year, the medical first year course was organized as common first year of healthcare studies with pharmacy, dentistry and midwifery. This year was commonly viewed as "very difficult".

This system changed in 2019 via a major reform into a hybrid model. On the one hand, students can still access a second year in healthcare studies via a modified version of the traditional first year model (parcours accès santé – PASS). In doing so, they have to choose a minor in another subject in which they can continue, should they fail the selection process into the second year. On the other hand, universities now offer undergraduate degrees (licence accès santé – LAS) in many subjects that include a minor in healthcare, allowing them to take the selective exams that grant access to the second year of healthcare studies.

== Organization ==
Medical studies proceed in three cycles within a university having a unit of medical research and training (sometimes a combination of medicine and pharmacology), associated with one of the 29 university hospitals. Their total duration varies from nine years (general medicine) to eleven years (another speciality plus a sub-speciality).

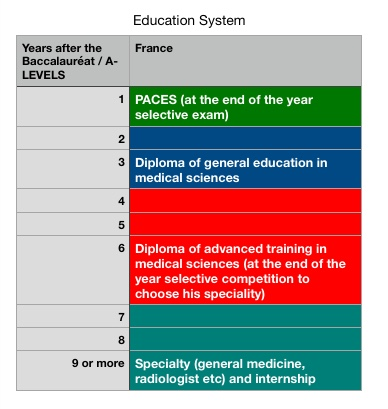
Description of medical studies in France

=== First cycle of medical studies ===
The first cycle of medical studies (also known as the PCEM) takes two years, with a "concours" (competitive final exam) at the end of the first year selecting students admitted to continue medical or dental studies.

National law specifies that the instruction of the first cycle and the first year of the second cycle must include the following disciplines or disciplinary units:

- physics, biophysics, and image processing;
- chemistry, biochemistry, cellular, and molecular biology;
- anatomy, embryology, developmental, and reproductive biology;
- cytology, histology, and pathological anatomy;
- bacteriology, virology, and parasitology;
- fundamental hematology, immunology, and oncology;
- genetics and biotechnologies;
- physiology and nutrition;
- pharmacology and major classes of drugs;
- epidemiology and biostatistics;
- clinical and biological semiotics and medical imagery terminology;
- first aid;
- demography, health economics, and health systems.

Teaching must also include foreign languages, epistemology, psychology, medical ethics and deontology.

==== First year (until 2009) ====
The first year academic cycle for medical students is common with dentistry and midwifery.

Requirements during the first year include: physics, biophysics, chemistry, biochemistry and molecular biology, cellular biology, physiology, anatomy, histology, and embryology.

==== First year (since 2010) ====
The first year of the studies of health (ex-PACES, currently called PASS) is common to the medical studies, dental, pharmaceutical and midwife (sometimes also kinesitherapy). It is divided into two six-month periods.

To be allowed to be registered in first year of the studies of health, the candidates must have one of the following qualifications:

- a baccalauréat degree;
- a diploma of "access to academic works";
- a French diploma or foreign diploma that can be considered equivalent to the baccalauréat pursuant to the national regulation;
- a qualification or an achievement considered to be sufficient.

As for any formation of system LMD, the year is divided in two six-month periods and “units of teaching” (EU) which are seen allotting a certain number of appropriations ECTS.

In first half of the year, the lesson is common to all the fields. Tests are organized at the end of this one; the badly classified students can be reorientated in other university fields.

With the second half-year, the students choose one or of the EU specific (S) to a field, in addition to the common formation. The students pass a competition at the end of the year leading to four classifications.

The first year may only be repeated once. The grade is final if the student fails to pass twice.

==== Second year ====
The second year (in summary PCEM 2 or P2) begins with four weeks of obligatory and non-remunerated nurse placement. It takes place during the holidays preceding the re-entry by the students admitted in second year of medicine or odontology.

Lastly, a more medical matter, the semiotics, traditionally taught in third year, is at the present time transferred in second year in most universities, in order to improve the range of the clinical training courses of second and third years (usually called “training courses of checklist” or “training course of semiotics”).

The first cycle of the medical studies follows a national plan, but the organization between the two years varies between the universities. In the same way, there exist three types of teaching:

- linear teaching: each matter is taught separately (anatomy, histology, biophysics, etc.). This type of teaching does not require great coordination between the professors, but it can lead to great redundancies, even with contradictions.
- integrated teaching: the students have modules gathering of the lesson of various disciplines around the same apparatus. For example, a module of neurosciences includes/understands the anatomy and the histology of the nervous system, sensory biophysics and the neurobiochimy. The student follows then a cardiopulmonary module, a digestive module, etc.
- coeducation: certain aspects are presented in integrated teaching, others in linear teaching.

=== Second cycle of medical studies ===
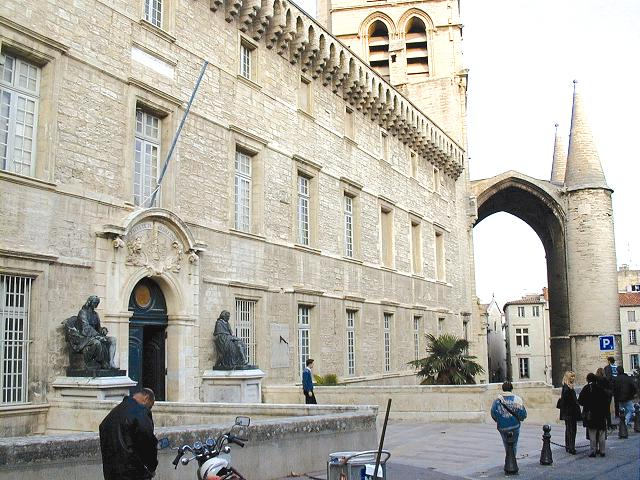
The Medical college of the Montpellier, the oldest in the world

In four years, the student receives a formal and practical training on the various pathologies segmented in modules: transverse modules (more or less interdisciplinary) or modules of body. These modules are the classifying official program of the national examination (see low), and include a numbered list of items which correspond either to pathologies, or with clinical or therapeutic situations.

==== Third year of medicine ====
The third year of medicine (in summary DCEM 1 or D1) is a year of transition where the student learns bioclinical sciences (pharmacology, bacteriology, virology, parasitology, etc.) which make the interface between fundamental sciences of the first cycle and lesson of pathology. They also learn how to carry out the anamnèse (medical history) and the clinical examination of a patient at the time of their clinical training courses (called “training courses of checklists”, because the clinical examination linear and is structured, with boxes which one notches) associated with teaching with semiology. They start with the first modules.

Certain universities start the hospital training courses in third year, the clinical training course of second year is then developed further.

This year is particularly compatible with Erasmus exchanges.

==== Externship ====
The three following years constitute the “externat”. This term of everyday usage (which is a survival of the old contest of the externat removed following the demonstrations of 1968) does not officially exist. The official texts and the internal texts of the CHU and the universities speak about “hospital students”, because the students are remunerated by the hospital complex to which the university is attached. They are paid under limited time contract, attached to a social security office.

The student, under the responsibility for an intern (nonofficial) or of a senior (senior registrar or hospital practitioner), learn how to recognize the various signs of a disease. The student at this stage does not have therapeutic responsibility, nor the right to prescribe. The student is however responsible for their acts (civil responsibility, which requires the subscription of a suitable insurance).

The externat generally consists of four training courses per year, three months in each specialty service, chosen by grids at the beginning of each year or quarter, either by classification with the merit, or by alphabetical classification. The training courses consist of five mornings per week in the services. Certain training courses are obligatory from the statutory texts (pediatrics, obstetric gynaecology surgery, internal medicine and emergency medicine.), and can then integrate theoretical teaching (the student is present at the hospital all the day). Conversely, certain services do not have the external ones, that depends on the agreements made with the university.

Certain universities replaced the half-time (mornings) permanent by one full-time by alternation: the external ones are then present all the day but only 6 weeks over 3 months, the 6 remaining weeks being devoted to the lesson, the examinations, the preparation of the ECN…

During the externat, lecturing, is replaced more and more by directed work; the lectures are held in alternation with hospital training courses: this teaching is that of a true trade-guild, where the external one approaches by “clinical cases” of true situations lived in the services.

The external one must, during its three years of externat, to carry out 36 sessions of 12, 18, or 24 hours (according to the service and the day of the week), that is to say approximately a session per month, remunerated 26 euros rough.

The remuneration of the training courses is as for it “symbolic system” (approximate remuneration: 122 euros per month in fourth year, 237 euros in fifth year, 265 euros in sixth year), but the external student has the statute of a paid worker and contributes to the paid mode of social security, and the pension fund. The pension fund complementary to external is the IRCANTEC, as it is the case for the interns and the hospital practitioners. The external ones, like any employee, have five weeks of paid vacations.

Since 2004, the second cycle of the medical studies is sanctioned by a diploma (recognized in the European Union). Module 11 of the second cycle is the old certificate of clinical and therapeutic, essential synthesis to replace a general doctor.

=== Third cycle of the medical studies ===
Students able to reach the third cycle of medical studies (TCEM):

- have completed the second cycle of the medical studies in France;
- are amenable to the European state or Community, Swiss Confederation, Principality Member States of Andorra left to the agreement on European Economic Area, others that France, holders of a diploma of end of second cycle of the medical studies or of an equivalent title from one of these states.

==== National ranking tests ====
Tests are organized for the candidates quoted above.

According to its classification, the student chooses their university hospital (and thus the city) of assignment. This choice is carried out initially by Internet (phase of pre-choice and simulations), the final choice taking place during a “amphitheatre of garrison” which brings together all the students by sections of classification. This procedure makes it possible the student to choose their station by being informed fully of the places available.

The 11 existing fields in 2008 are, with the number of places available, or 5704 places on the whole:

- General medicine: 3200 stations
- Medical specialties: 885 stations
- Surgical specialties: 550 stations
- Psychiatry: 280 stations
- Anaesthesia-reanimation: 260 stations
- Pediatric: 200 stations
- Gynecology-obstetrics: 155 stations
- Public health: 60 stations
- Medical biology: 40 stations
- Occupational medicine: 54 stations
- Medical gynaecology: 20 stations

In 2005, a thousand places were not filled, certain students preferring to retry rather than to choose a speciality by default.

==== Hospital training ====
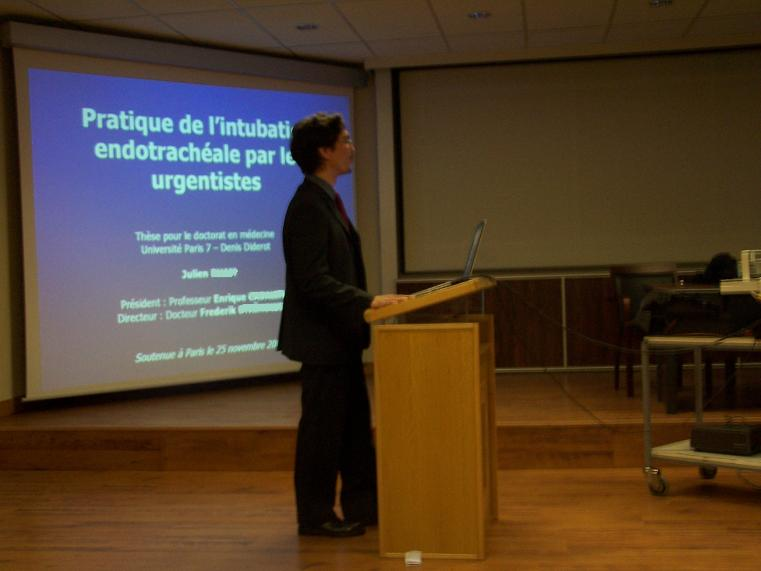
Defence of a thesis exercise.

Although they have the statute of student and a supervision, an intern is an autonomous professional, since they can prescribe and carry out replacements in liberal cabinets (provided they have on validated a certain number of six-month periods, and obtained a “licence of replacement” from the departmental council of doctors). They act more than one initial track records that real studies (more especially as France is one of the rare countries to regard the interns as students). They are paid employees.

Training in general medicine lasts three years, and is validated when all the six month training courses necessary have been carried out (diploma of specialized studies of general medicine) and it is followed by submitting a medical thesis. It consists of six month training courses during which time they are remunerated, associated with a hospital, but also associated with a general doctor, or of an extra-hospital structure of care. The student takes complete charge of their patients, but still under the responsibility of a “senior” (see supra): this includes clinical examination, regulation of complementary examinations and treatment. Teaching is primarily practical at this stage.

Speciality training lasts four years or more. Depending on the speciality chosen, the student must take a minimum number of training courses in hospital services where their role is similar to the paid trainees in general medicine described above. The training is complete when the candidate has done each of the mandatory six month training courses. It also requires a medical thesis generally relating to a topic of the chosen speciality, generally in the last year of training. The speciality is sanctioned by the diploma of specialized studies, after defence of a report, which is sometimes confused with the thesis (thesis-report, when this one is constant in the last year of training and relates to a subject of the speciality).

The diploma of State of doctor of medicine is conferred after defence successfully thesis of exercise.

== Registrarship and assistantship ==
For certain specialities, in particular surgery, additional training is required: either at a university clinic for two to four years, or a specialty assistantship for at least one year. The total training for these specialities therefore ranges from 12 to 16 years.

== See also ==
- French education system, Higher learning in France, University in France
- General medicine
- Medicine
- Medical education by country category
- Medical school
- Physician

== Bibliography ==
- Mattei, Jean-François; Étienne, Jean-Claude; Chabot, Jean-Michel (1997). De la médecine à la santé : Pour une réforme des études médicales et la création d'universités de la santé [From medicine to health: A reform of medical studies and the creation of universities of health] (in French). Paris: Flammarion. ISBN 2-08-201634-X.
