= Bucquet =

Bucquet is a surname. Notable people with the surname include:

- Harold S. Bucquet (1891–1946), English film director
- Jean-Baptiste-Michel Bucquet (1746–1780), French chemist
- Marie-Françoise Bucquet (1937–2018), French pianist
- Maurice Bucquet (1860–1921), French sports shooter and Olympian
