= Women led uprisings =

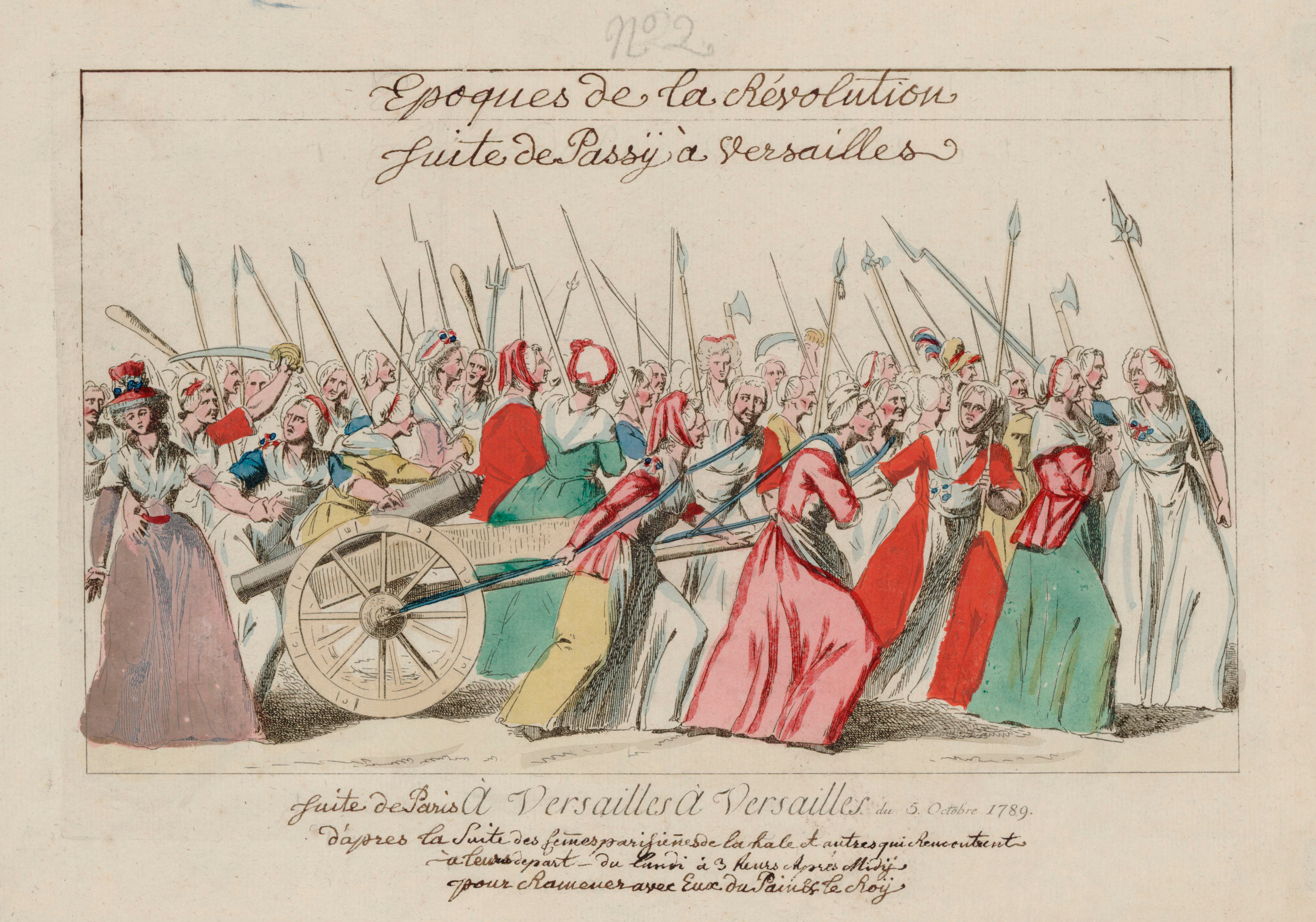
Women's March on Versailles during the French Revolution, 1789

Women-led uprisings are mass protests that are initiated by women as an act of resistance or rebellion in defiance of an established government. A protest is a statement or action taken part to express disapproval of or object an authority, most commonly led in order to influence public opinion or government policy. They range from village food riots against imposed taxes to protests that initiated the Russian Revolution.

Some women-led mass protests deliberately set out to emphasise the gender (or gender role) of the organisers and participants: for example, the Mothers of the Plaza de Mayo emphasised their common role as mothers by marching in white headscarves to symbolise the diapers of their lost children. In other settings, women may strip naked in order to draw attention to their cause, or to shame or intimidate those whom they are protesting.

== Early history ==
=== The creation of the first human societies ===
Studies of contemporary hunter-gatherers show that their strong sense of moral community is maintained by autonomous individuals who constantly resist any form of personal domination. In fact, many hunter-gatherers are so egalitarian and communistic that even a non-Marxist anthropologist like Christopher Boehm argues that hunter-gatherer societies – the first human societies – must have originated in uprisings against dominant males.

Chris Knight, and other anthropologists influenced by Karl Marx and Friedrich Engels, have theorised that these uprisings were led by women looking for collective support to ease their childcare burdens. They have used a wide range of evidence from anthropology, primatology, mythic narratives, evolutionary biology and archaeology. Some Marxists have dismissed these ideas. However, although the idea of women-led uprisings creating the first societies is controversial, a number of highly respected anthropologists have taken the thesis seriously. (Mary Douglas, Robin Dunbar, David Lewis-Williams, Caroline Humphrey, Marilyn Strathern, Clive Gamble, Keith Hart and Chris Stringer have all made favourable comments about Knight's work.)

=== Trung Sisters ===
The Trưng Sisters led the first independence movement in ancient Vietnam. Often depicted riding on elephant back, they mounted a rebellion in 40 AD and successfully defeated the Han-dynasty overlords. They then ruled over the nation, but the seasoned troops of Ma Yuan soon crushed the brief period of autonomy, and both sisters committed suicide by jumping into a river. They are widely respected as icons of women's rights and determination in modern Vietnam.

=== Boudica ===
Boudica was a queen of the British Celtic Iceni tribe who led an uprising against the conquering forces of the Roman Empire in AD 60 or 61. She died shortly after its failure and was said to have poisoned herself. She is considered a British folk hero.

== 17th and 18th centuries ==
=== Food riots ===
E. P. Thompson's classic article "The Moral Economy of the English Crowd in the 18th Century" emphasised women's role in many food riots. He argued that the rioters insisted on the idea of a moral community that was obliged to feed them and their families. As one contemporary commentator wrote: "Women are more disposed to be mutinous ... [and] in all public tumults they are foremost in violence and ferocity."

John Bohstedt later argued that Thompson had exaggerated women's role in food riots. Thompson responded by forcefully rejecting Bohstedt's criticism. While it is not possible to know the exact level of women's involvement in 18th century food riots, it appears that, at the very least, women led or initiated a significant minority of such riots and they participated in many more. Women participated more fully in food riots than they had in earlier anti-impressment riots of 1747, in which they defended community interest and enforced community morality. These riots of revolution and resistance opened up opportunities for women to take political action as social and economic influencers, and not just as a republican's wife or a mother. Thompson indicates that women's new assertiveness had something to do with the weakening of the patriarchal control of women as feudalism declined and market relations expanded.

Men and women participated in food riots in Ireland, Belgium, the Netherlands and Germany (where contemporary reports claimed that women initiated many riots). Dutch tax riots in the seventeenth and eighteenth centuries were more numerous and often more violent, with participants of both lower and lower-middle classes, whereas food riots drew only lower-class participants. In the seventeenth and eighteenth centuries, at least 26 riots and 50 demonstrations involved women, with 10 being chiefly under their control. Women did the cooking and purchased foodstuffs for their families; therefore, they were the first parties to be confronted with scarcities of food and high prices. In doing so, women generally controlled much of the household finances. Another reason for their participation is due to the fact that food riots typically started in market places near shops and mills, which is where women gathered the most.

One of the most prominent tax riots in 1616 has even gone on record as "the Women's Revolt of Delft". Women also conducted nearly a third of food riots during the American Revolution despite the fact that they were excluded from the vote, unqualified to serve as jurors at courts and law, and were essentially politically disabled by their dependent status. It made a difference that Americans knew that women figured prominently in food riots in England and Europe, and it made a difference that ideas of equity, neighborly dealing, and charity informed American women's daily lives in the colonial period. Roughly 100 women marched a "Female Riot" and took to the streets in July 1777 insisting on their right to enforce equitable exchange.

== Long 19th century ==
=== French Revolution ===
Women were especially prominent in food riots in French marketplaces (although men dominated those in the countryside). The most momentous French food riot was the Women's March on Versailles. This occurred in October 1789, when the market women of Paris began calling the men 'cowards' and declaring: 'We will take over!' The women proceeded to march to Versailles with soldiers following them. The crowd then forced the King to return to Paris where, three years later, women were again major participants in the demonstrations that led to the abolition of the monarchy. A police inspector said in 1793: "It is mainly the women who are stirred up, women who in turn communicate all their frenzy to the men, heating them up with their seditious propositions and stimulating the most violent effervescence."

Meanwhile, women in the countryside initiated 'counter-revolutionary' protests against the new government's policies of the repression of the Church and the conscription of male peasants into the army.

During the French Revolution, women led the fight for religion. Their fight would lead the way for the feminization of religions. Women felt that they were responsible for maintaining a spiritual balance within their family. They fought harder than their male counterparts, sometimes invoking violent and illegal actions to get their voices heard. If women were arrested, the men in their lives would downplay the damage they could do, and women were seen as more hysterical and vulnerable as a whole, so society generally thought little of their violent and illegal actions. But if a woman refused or avoided taking part in petitions or marches, she would be shamed until guilted into taking part.

Women during the French Revolution also fought for their own rights. Aristocratic women were not as likely to partake in the activities that could ruin their family and/or their chance of inheriting the family fortune (or what she would receive), so they were reluctant to participate. Working class women also faced this dilemma, but because they were already suppressed, the good of what they could achieve outweighed the loss of family pride and/or fortune. Louis XVI had allowed all people who paid taxes to vote, but since women could not pay taxes, they could not vote. While the Third Estate made rules, women would present their opinions through pamphlets and petitions to let the Third Estate know what they wanted. Pétition des femmes du Tiers-Etat au Roi stated that women wanted education to go beyond French and Latin for church, more jobs to be available to women, and to raise the maximum pay of 5–6 sous. Motion en Faveur du Sexe and Discours préliminaire de la pauvre Javotte focused on dowries and marriage. In the working class, finding a job was hard enough for men, harder for women, and saving enough money to get married was almost impossible. Women did not want to have to pay a dowry to get married; this applied only in the Third Estate. The Rights of Woman by Olympe de Gouges was a complete pamphlet that stated all the rights that women should have. It was copied almost word for word from the Declaration of the Rights of Man, but applied to women. Another booklet, Griefs et plaintes des femmes mal mariées, criticised marriage laws that entailed women submitting to men, and demanded the legalization of divorce.

Within the bourgeoisie, Madame Etta Palm van Aelder was a leading figure in fighting for women's rights. She demanded the equal right to education, political freedom, divorce and the legal freedom of women of age 21 and over. While political freedom would not be gained until after the Revolution, all of van Aelder's other demands would be met in some way. In August 1792, women aged 21 and above were given legal freedom from their parents. In September 1792, women were granted the right to divorce and the Law of 1794 eased the divorce process. Educational programs were advanced and allowed women to be trained for careers, but they still did not obtain equality. Female teachers were paid less than males and primary school classes were divided by gender. After the advancements and improvements in the educational system, women were not much better off than before.

R. B. Rose argues that despite the efforts of women during the Revolution, little changed. The Revolution was a revolution for the men, and a place of chaos for the women. The French Revolutionary Constitution of 1791 allowed women to be labeled as citizens, but nothing else. They did not have voting rights or the ability to run for office. The Napoleonic Code of 1804 suppressed wives into submission to their husbands, reversing all equality demands made during the Revolution. Women still could not own land because they could not legally sign any contract, putting the land into the hands of her closest male relative.

=== Franco-Prussian War ===
During the Franco-Prussian War of 1871, women were prominent in preventing the army from moving their cannons from Paris, an event which helped spark the Paris Commune.

== 20th century ==
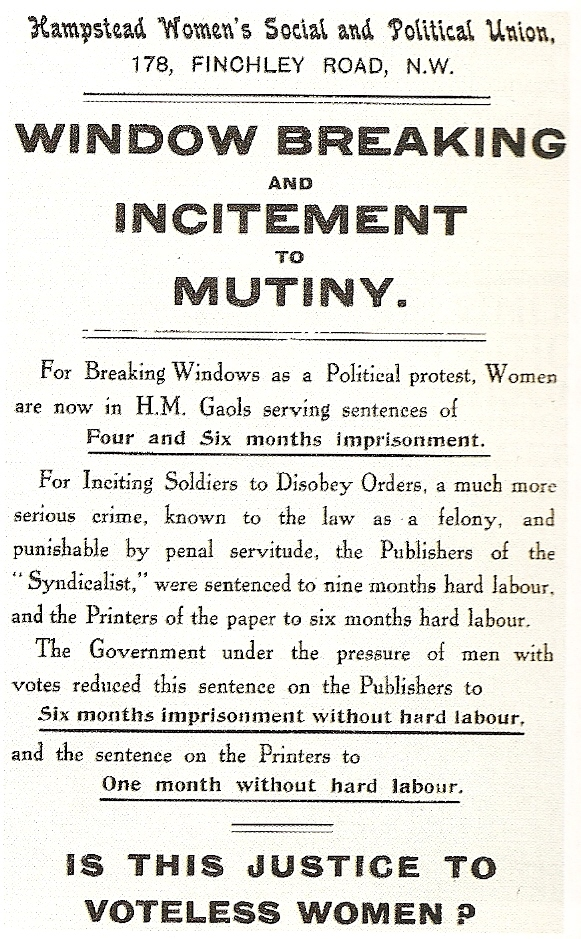
Suffragette handbill

=== British women's suffrage movement ===
During the early twentieth century, women's protests for the right to vote became particularly militant in Britain. Many of the core organisers of mass protests were women. Strategies used by protestors included mass demonstrations, arson, widespread window breaking and attempts to storm both Parliament and Buckingham Palace. After World War I broke out in 1914, the mainstream suffragette movement suspended its protests in order to focus on the war effort.

=== World War I ===
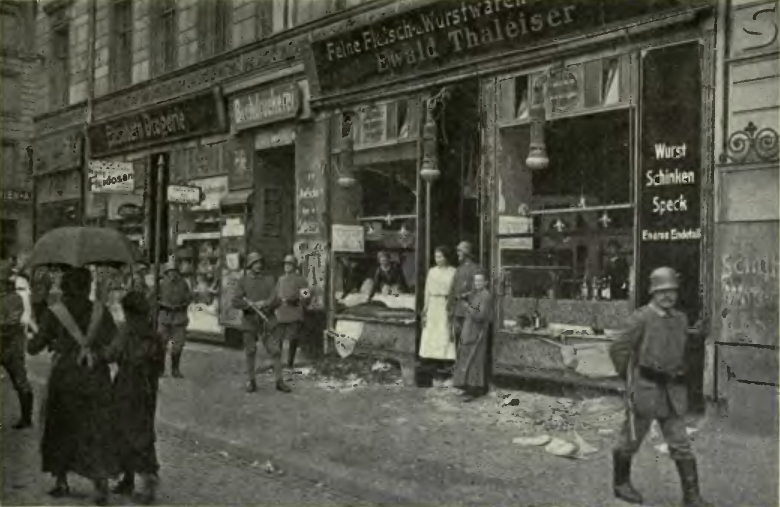
Aftermath of Berlin food riot, 1918

During World War I, women led large numbers of food riots in Germany, Russia, Italy and elsewhere. Women workers also led the way in strike-waves in Berlin and Paris. The German authorities reported that union leaders were doing 'everything possible to prevent such disturbances and strikes over food provisions, but ... it is the countless female workers who constantly agitate and stir things up.' Women's prominence in these struggles helped delegitimize the war, and the regimes that were fighting it, paving the way for the huge strike-waves and revolutions at the end of the war.

Women participated in and organised several food riots that broke out in North America during the early twentieth century. Women also led food riots in Japan and non-belligerent Spain. Women's protests against high food prices spread across Spain in both 1913 and 1918. In Barcelona, in 1918, women used the slogan: 'In the name of humanity, all women take to the streets!' They organised repeated demonstrations and attacked shops, warehouses, government offices and music halls. Women also staged food riots during the Spanish Civil War.

=== Russian Revolution ===
Karl Marx had recognized that "great social revolutions are impossible without the feminine ferment" and, in 1917, it was Petrograd's (Saint Petersburg) female workers who spread the idea of a general strike on 8 March, International Women's Day. On that day, hundreds of women threw stones and snowballs at factory windows demanding for bread. Economic depression in 1917 particularly devastated the working-class women because prices of daily necessities increased tremendously, but their low wages did not compensate for the increase in prices of goods. After a long and tiring day of labor, women had to line up for hours just to get a loaf of bread. Sometimes after wasting hours waiting in line, the bread would run out. The protests were led by thousand of female workers and inspired male factory workers to join them and demand changes. Women participated in the riots by attacking police stations and bakeries. However, many troops refused to shoot protesting women, who were often walking with their children. As Leon Trotsky later wrote, the women took hold of the soldiers' rifles and 'beseeched almost commanded: "put down your bayonets and join us"', and, within five days, the centuries-old Tsarist regime had collapsed.

As Bolsheviks took over Petrograd and Moscow in October 1917, tense relationship were discern between rulers and working-class women. Scarcity and hunger made it very difficult for Russian workers to transform society themselves and women's participation did not continue at the same level as in February–March 1917. However, it was women's food protests, in May 1918, that sparked the first major wave of workers' unrest against the new Bolshevik authorities. Later, during Joseph Stalin's program of breakneck industrialization and forced collectivization, women were again at the forefront of the workers' strikes and peasant protests that resisted this brutal policy. Stalin's regime was, however, able to contain all resistance through starvation and repression.

=== Colonial Nigeria ===
There were several uprisings led by women in Colonial Nigeria. In November 1929, the Women's War began after thousands of Igbo women started rioting in protest over the actions of native warrant chiefs and introduction of new taxes on palm products. During the riots, Igbo women utilised sociocultural and sociopolitical networks which had existed prior to British colonisation, sending messages through market and kinship networks to other villages calling for a mikiri meeting. They also took advantage of strikes, boycotts, and force to project their opinions and retaliate against authority. Women of wealth and generosity who could speak well typically took leading roles in village wide mikiri gatherings, which had the largest influence on the rise of the Women's War. During mikiri, decisions were made on how to respond against being wronged by the Warrant Chief's corruption and by the taxes that they anticipated to be enforced upon them. During the late 1940s, the Abeokuta Women's Revolt protested the colonial government's imposition of new taxes upon women. Funmilayo Ransome-Kuti led mass protests of women outside the palace of Ladapo Ademola.

=== United States civil rights movement ===
It was a boycott of segregated buses by African-American women that sparked the civil rights movement in 1955. This case inspired activists across the world to make a change and fight oppression.

American women increasingly rejected commonplace patriarchal family structures and sexual repression in the 1960s, influencing the sexual revolution, protests for equal pay, and a greater visibility of women in American culture. The revived feminist movement then helped transform gender roles in the following decades. Stormé DeLarverie, a biracial butch lesbian activist, is credited with inciting the Stonewall uprising in New York City in 1969, a major turning point in the 1960s–1970s gay liberation movement.

=== United Kingdom ===
Women were also at the forefront of many working class struggles in the 1970s and 1980s. In the British Isles, women's protests and leadership were significant during The Troubles in Northern Ireland, during the Grunwick dispute and during the miners' strike.

=== Iran ===
For decades, Iranian women have struggled with basic human rights and systemic oppression rooted in traditional religious and political structures. Islamic beliefs on gender equality were shaped and enforced by higher authorities, exerting male domination over Iranian women. In 1979, during the so-called Islamic Revolution that overthrew the Shah of Iran, women gathered in the streets to protest. However, the changes they called for never materialized. Instead, a totalitarian state—the Islamic Republic of Iran—came into being. It wasn't until the 1990s that the full impact of the Islamic regime's oppression of women became clear. During this period, young women and activists began pushing back against Islamic ideologies, challenging, for example, restrictive divorce laws and dress codes deemed “revealing” by the authoritarian regime.

Significant restrictions on basic human rights and the oppression of Iranian women have continued since the 1990s, intensifying over time and becoming especially visible today as Gen Z Iranians gain greater access to the world online. In 2022, what's called the “first feminist revolution” began following the killing of 22-year-old Kurdish-Iranian woman Mahsa Amini by state forces, events that are widely referred to as the Mahsa Amini protests. "Women, Life, Freedom" became the movement’s defining chant and continues to resonate today, at immense cost: the loss of children, youth, adults, and pensioners across Iran’s cities and rural regions, particularly in the mountainous Kurdish areas. The September 2022 protests prompted some shifts in sanctions by the United Kingdom, Canada, and the United States. However, the struggle in Iran calls for far more robust international action against a violent and oppressive regime—one that continues to bar women from entering football stadiums and from appearing in public without a headscarf and loose clothing.

== 21st century ==
Women continue to play a prominent role in many food riots – for example, in 2008 over 1,000 women protested the Peruvian government's response to rising food prices.

On January 20, 2017, the day after Donald Trump was inaugurated as the 45th US president, women, men, and children marched in protest of Trump and to promote solidarity with other women in order to resist women's oppression and mistreatment. Over 680 marches throughout the US and in more than 68 countries around the world were held as part of the Women's March. More than 1,000,000 people participated in the "flagship march" in Washington, D.C.

=== Rojava Revolution ===
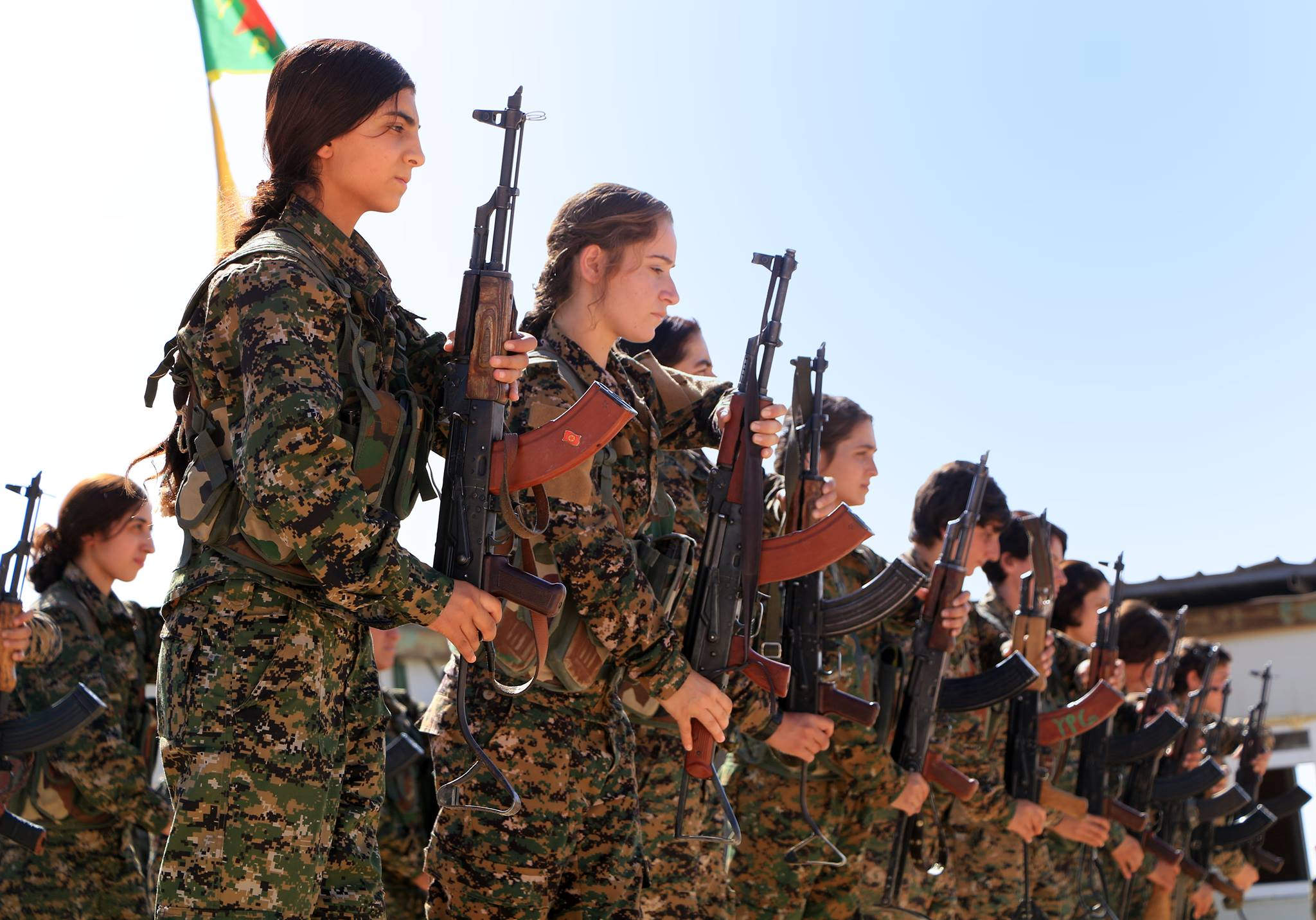
The YPG, Women's Protection Units

Northern Syria is what is referred to as the Rojava. The Rojava revolution, or Rojava conflict, refers to the armed struggle that has taken place since 2012. The Rojava Revolution has been characterized by the prominent role women have had during these times of strife.

The novel Revolution in Rojava: Democratic Autonomy and Women's Liberation in Syrian Kurdistan documents the Kurdish women and how they were and still are oppressed. As Kurds, they were denied basic rights, in many cases even citizenship; and as women they were trapped in patriarchal domination. The Kurdish women's movement seeks to overcome the alienation of Kurdish women. The fight for women's rights has always been a part of Kurdish history. One of the first signs of revolution in Rojava was the election of Hêvî Îbrahîm to the post of the prime minister in February 2014.

Indeed, many women were assuming leadership positions. Asya Abdullah has emerged as a leader figure in the Kurdish independence movement. She has been described in the press as a "driving force in the battle for Kurdish freedom." She has championed the role of women in bringing about social change, stating that "you can't have real change without putting women at the centre."

With this transformation, women also began getting involved with security and military roles. In 2012, women from the PYD, the People's Defense Units, created a unit dedicated to the fight for women. The Women's fighting units, also known as YPJ, have played a role in the liberations of towns like Kobanî and Manbij. Since September 2014, Kurdish women have been playing a leading role in the fight against ISIS. The creation of the YPJ is a fascinating development in a region where women's rights are often repressed. But with the formation of these groups, has come with sexist media coverage. The media is more concerned with the fighters' looks rather than what they are fighting for.

Women in the PKK guerrilla army follow Jineology which simply put, means women's science. The goal of jineology is to give women and society access to science and knowledge and to strengthen the connections of science and knowledge to society. The Rojava Revolution has been characterized by a high level of women participation in politics, safe houses for women dealing with sexual assault or violence, and women-run academies dedicated to the study of jineology.

Out of the conflict of the popular uprising in Syria, Kurdish women took up arms alongside men and took control of Northern Syria, also known as Rojava. The women fight alongside men both in mixed units of the People's Defense Units (YPG) as well as in their own Women's Protection Units (YPJ). Women constitute an estimated 35–40% of the entire Kurdish forces.

=== Mahsa Amini protests ===
Civil unrest and protests against the government of Iran associated with the death in police custody of Mahsa Amini began on 16 September 2022 and are ongoing as of December 2022. Amini, a Kurdish women had been arrested by the Guidance Patrol, Iran's religious morality police, for allegedly violating Iran's mandatory hijab law, which requires all women to wear the hijab (Islamic veil) in public. The Guidance Patrol alleged that Amini was wearing her hijab improperly, and according to eyewitnesses, she had been severely beaten by officers, an assertion denied by Iranian authorities. As the protests spread from Amini's hometown of Saqqez to other cities in the province of Kurdistan and throughout the country, the government responded with widespread Internet blackouts, nationwide restrictions on social media usage, tear gas and gunfire.

Although the protests have not been as deadly as those in 2019 (when more than 1,500 were killed), they have been "nationwide, spread across social classes, universities, the streets [and] schools", and called the "biggest challenge" to the government of Iran since the Islamic Revolution in 1979. as of 27 December 2022 at least 476 people, including 64 minors, had been killed as a result of the government's intervention in the protests; (Note: according to the non-profit organization Iran Human Rights) an estimated 18,480 have been arrested (Note: according to HRANA, as of 22 December) throughout at least 134 cities and towns, and at 132 universities. (Note: according to HRANA as of 4 November)

Supreme Leader Ayatollah Ali Khamenei dismissed the widespread unrest not only as "riots" but also as a "hybrid war" caused by foreign states and dissidents abroad. Women, including schoolchildren, have played a key role in the demonstrations, with many removing their hijab in solidarity with Amini. In addition to demands for increased rights for women, the protests have demanded the overthrow of the Islamic Republic, setting them apart from previous major protest movements in Iran, which have focused on election results or economic woes.

== See also ==
- International Women's Day
- Women's March on Versailles
- The Bread and Roses strike by immigrant textile workers in Lawrence, Massachusetts in 1912 was led to a large extent by women.
- Women's Social and Political Union
- February Revolution
- Huda Sha'arawi
- Rosa Parks
- Women Against Pit Closures
- Origins of society
- List of food riots
- List of women who led a revolt or rebellion
- Mud March (suffragists)
- Abolition Riot of 1836
- Jenny Geddes
- Women in the decolonisation of Africa
