= Yocoboué =

Yocoboué Yokoboué
- Town and sub-prefecture
- Location in Ivory Coast
- Coordinates: 5°16′N 5°6′W
- Country: Ivory Coast
- District: Gôh-Djiboua
- Region: Lôh-Djiboua
- Department: Guitry

Population (2014)
  - Total: 22,760
- Time zone: UTC+0 (GMT)

Yocoboué (also spelled Yokoboué) is a town in southern Ivory Coast. It is a sub-prefecture of Guitry Department in Lôh-Djiboua Region, Gôh-Djiboua District. It is located in the southeastern corner of Gôh-Djiboua District near the border with Lagunes District.

In 2014, the population of the sub-prefecture of Yocoboué was 22,760.

== Villages ==
The 14 villages of the Yocoboué sub-prefecture and their population in 2014 are:

1. Bangourédougou (1,780)
2. Dioulabougou-Boléko (3,936)
3. Doguidoukou (1,031)
4. Guégboudoukou (260)
5. Kragbédoukou (848)
6. Méné (175)
7. Nandjedoukou (569)
8. Taboué (2,429)
9. Tachidou I (951)
10. Tachidou II (3,023)
11. Tiko (2,055)
12. Yakassé (171)
13. Yocoboué (5,030)
14. Zrimbadoukou (502)
