= Guitry, Ivory Coast =

Guitry Guitri
- Town, sub-prefecture, and commune
- Location in Ivory Coast
- Coordinates: 5°31′N 5°14′W
- Country: Ivory Coast
- District: Gôh-Djiboua
- Region: Lôh-Djiboua
- Department: Guitry

Population (2014)
  - Total: 53,296
- Time zone: UTC+0 (GMT)

Guitry (also spelled Guitri) is a town in southern Ivory Coast. It is a sub-prefecture of and the seat of Guitry Department in Lôh-Djiboua Region, Gôh-Djiboua District. Guitry is also a commune.

In 2014, the population of the sub-prefecture of Guitry was 147,000.

== Villages ==
The 19 villages of the sub-prefecture of Guitry and their population in 2014 are:

1. Babokon-Appolo (2,470)
2. Babokon-Gogoua (275)
3. Bada (533)
4. Bobiadoukou (1,207)
5. Brahéri (2,652)
6. Dioligby (2,400)
7. Gnambouasso (793)
8. Guitry (11,445)
9. Kouta (7,920)
10. Lézoudoukou (1,835)
11. Nanéko (828)
12. Oligbi (308)
13. Téhiri (2,678)
14. Tiégba 2 (1,705)
15. Anoumabou (2,088)
16. Awalézo (2,915)
17. Grogbako (2,562)
18. Kofesso (3,268)
19. Tiégba 1 (5,414)
