= Daniel Ouezzin Coulibaly =

Burkinabé politician (1909–1958)

Daniel Ouezzin Coulibaly (1 July 1909 – 7 September 1958) was the president of the governing council of the French colony of Upper Volta, today's Burkina Faso, from 17 May 1957 until his death on 7 September 1958 in Paris, France. A native of Pouy, today in Banwa Province, Coulibaly also served in the French national assembly from 1946 to 1951 and from 1956 to 1958, as well as in the French senate from 1953 to 1956.

His wife was Célestine Ouezzin Coulibaly (1914–1997).
