= Jean-Baptiste-Michel Bucquet =

French chemist and physicist (1746–1780)

- Born: 18 February 1746; Paris, Kingdom of France
- Died: 24 January 1780 (aged 33); Paris, Kingdom of France
- Education: University of Paris
- Scientific career
- Fields: Chemistry
- Workplaces: University of Paris
- Notable students: Antoine-François Fourcroy

Jean-Baptiste-Michel Bucquet (French: [bykɛ]; 18 February 1746 – 24 January 1780) was a French chemist, member of the French Royal Academy of Sciences, physician and public teacher.

== Life and work ==
Bucquet was born in Paris, in 1746. He was first sent to study law but he then turned to science and attended classes at the Faculty of Medicine in Paris. There he encountered for the first time chemistry applied to medicine. Despite financial trouble, he graduated in 1770 and thus became Docteur-Régent, and married Marie Claude Leredde shortly after. He then started teaching a public course in chemistry in his own laboratory. Between 1771 and 1773, Bucquet published a manual of chemistry, first on mineral then on vegetal chemistry, destined for the use of beginners in the science who need a coherent overview of the different processes and products in use. This manual was intended for people attending his course but also for those who could not. Bucquet's public course carried out for several years, and was mentioned in the Journal de Médecine. In 1775, Bucquet became professor of pharmacy at the Faculty of Medicine at the University of Paris, and the next year, following the death of Augustin Roux, he took the chair of chemistry at the Faculty. He became part of the French Academy of Sciences as a chemist in 1777. During his years at the academy, he published a few works of chemical analysis, including one in collaboration with the duke of La Rochefoucauld. He eventually acquired the laboratory in rue Jacob which used to belong to the chemist Guillaume-François Rouelle and carried out his public courses there. He continued giving public courses until 1779, at which point he became to ill to continue. He was known to be a very good teacher and many attended his courses. He died of his disease in 1780.

His most famous pupil was Antoine-François Fourcroy who later carried on Bucquet's work on natural history.

== Collaboration with Lavoisier ==
In 1777, Bucquet worked with Antoine Lavoisier at his residence of the Arsenal, performed many fundamental experiments of chemistry, with the aim of checking if there results which were widely used in chemistry, could still be considered reliable. Lavoisier had the financial means and necessary laboratory equipment to perform such a task and Bucquet brought his many years of experience in public demonstration and laboratory expertise. Together, they published 26 memoirs at the Academy of Sciences, which led to Bucquet's nomination as Academician.

== Publications ==
- Ergo digestio alimentorum vera digestio chimica, dissertation, Paris, in-4°.
- Introduction à l'étude des corps naturels, tirés du règne minéral. Paris, Jean-Th. Herissant, 1771.
- Introduction à l'étude des corps naturels, tirés du règne végétal. Paris, Veuve Hérissant, 1773.
- Mémoire sur la manière dont les animaux sont affectés par les différents fluides aériformes méphitiques, 1778.
- Rapport sur l'analyse du rob antisyphilitique de Boyveau-Laffecteur, Paris, 1779, in-8°.
