= Antoine-François de Fourcroy =

French chemist (1755–1809)

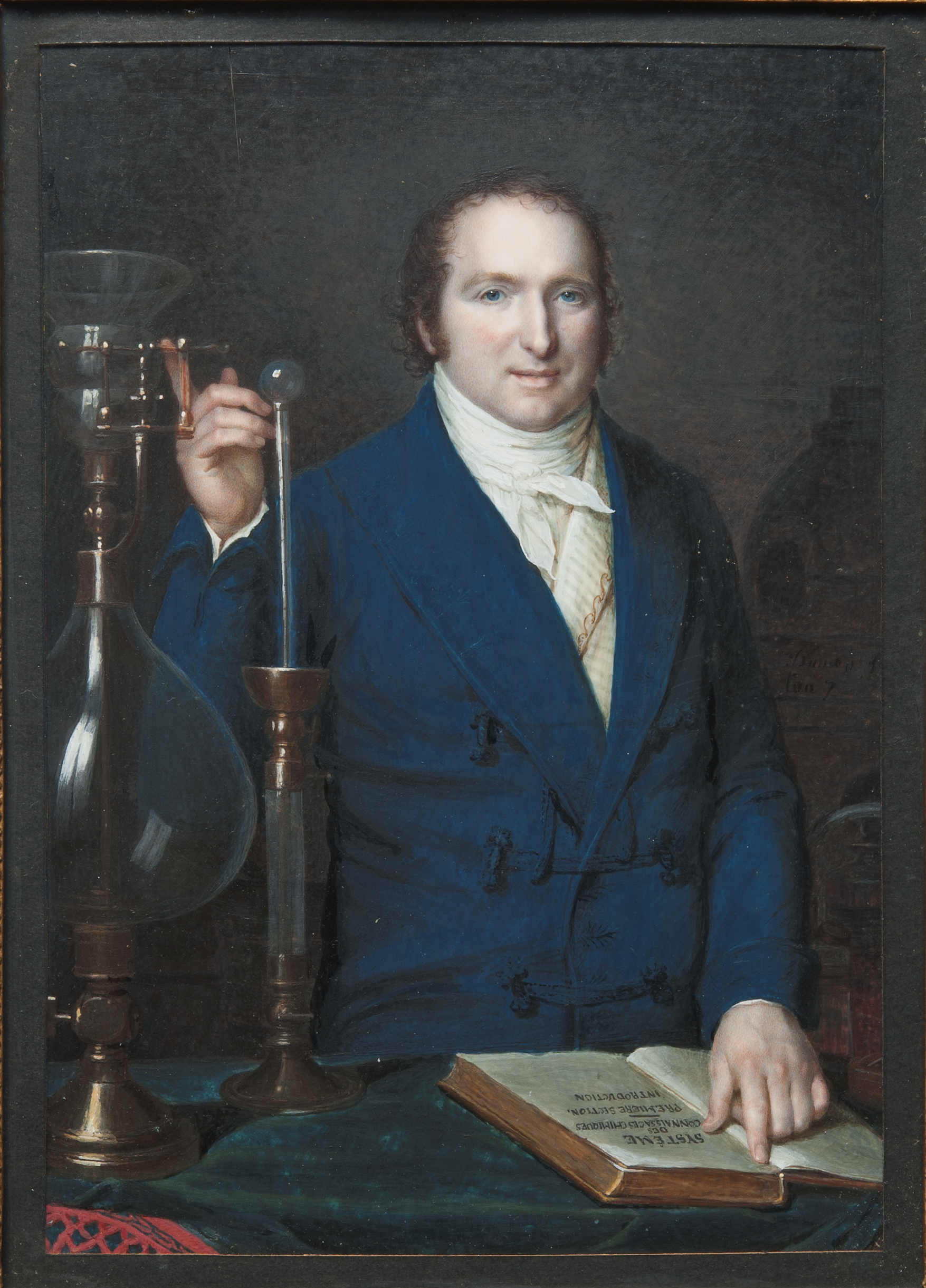
- Fourcroy with the first volume of his book Systeme des connaissances chimiques, painted by François Dumont c. 1800
- Born: 15 June 1755; Paris, France
- Died: 16 December 1809 (aged 54); Paris, France
- Resting place: Père Lachaise Cemetery
- Known for: Co-discovery of Iridium; Co-founding modern chemical nomenclature
- Scientific career
- Fields: Chemistry; Neurochemistry
- Workplaces: École Polytechnique
- Academic advisors: Jean Baptiste Michel Bucquet
- Notable students: Louis Nicolas Vauquelin

Antoine François Fourcroy (French: [ɑ̃twan fʁɑ̃swa fuʁkʁwa]; 15 June 1755 – 16 December 1809) was a French chemist and a contemporary of Antoine Lavoisier. Fourcroy collaborated with Lavoisier, Guyton de Morveau, and Claude Berthollet on the Méthode de nomenclature chimique, a work that helped standardize chemical nomenclature.

== Early life ==
Fourcroy was born in Paris, the son of an apothecary in the household of the Duke of Orléans. On the advice of the anatomist Félix Vicq-d'Azyr (1748–1794), he took up medical studies, and after many difficulties caused by lack of means, he finally obtained his doctor's diploma in 1780. He taught chemistry from (1783–1787) at the Veterinary School of Alfort. Fourcroy's attention was turned specifically to chemistry by J. B. M. Bucquet (1746–1780), the professor of chemistry at the Medical School of Paris. In 1784, Fourcroy was chosen to succeed P. J. Macquer (1718–1784) as lecturer in chemistry at the college of the Jardin du Roi, where his lectures attained great popularity.

== Work ==
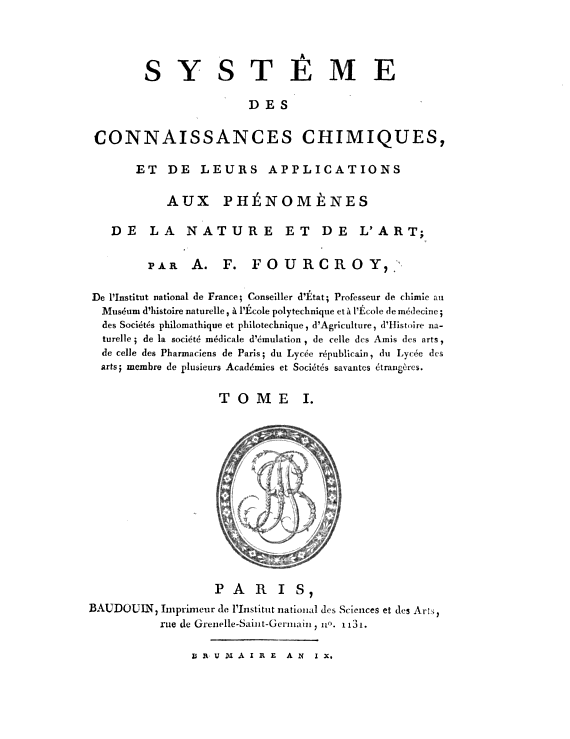
Last work published by Foucroy before his death, the "Système des connaissances chimiques et de leurs applications aux phénomènes de la nature et de l'art", 1801.

=== Chemical work ===
Fourcroy was one of the earliest converts to the views of Lavoisier, which he helped to make widely known by his own voluminous writings. The Royal Society's Catalogue of Scientific Papers enumerates fifty-nine memoirs by Fourcroy alone, and fifty-eight written with others, mostly Louis Nicolas Vauquelin. Fourcroy's 1785 publication, Entomologia Parisiensis, sive, Catalogus insectorum quae in agro Parisiensi reperiuntur ..., co-written with Étienne Louis Geoffroy, was a major contribution to systematic entomology.

Later, with Louis Nicolas Vauquelin, he identified a metal in a platinum residue they called ‘ptène’.This name ‘ptene’ or ‘ptène’ was reported as an early synonym for osmium.

=== Biological and Neurochemical Work ===
Fourcroy's views and studies grew from Bucquet. Fourcroy was a critic of earlier use of chemistry in medicine and saw great importance in studying the chemical materials of plants and animals, particularly for medicinal use. The majority of this work was done alongside Vauquelin, who became Fourcroy's assistant in 1784. During this period of work with Vauquelin, Fourcroy founded his own journal: La Médecine éclairée par les sciences physiques, ou Journal des découvertes relatives aux differentes parties de l'art de guérir, which detailed his investigations of chemistry and body materials. Fourcroy was convinced that "the successes of chemistry would one day change the face of medicine and result in beneficial revolution."

Although Fourcroy's name appears on a large number of chemical and also physiological and pathological memoirs, he was as much a teacher and an organizer as an original investigator. Beginning in 1791, Fourcroy would go on to publish three memoirs compounding his series of biological experiments, most of which had to do with the chemistry of the human brain. In his first, he described the conditions of the brains of the cadavers that he studied. In his second, he would recount his continuing chemical experimentation on the fatty matter in the brain, now known as lipids, as well as the inorganic components present. By using newer methods than the alchemical tradition that had preceded him, such as extraction and qualitative analysis, Fourcroy concluded that the brain was composed of fatty acids in combination with bases, along with recording some physical properties of the substance. His third memoir was a continuation of the separations and extractions he performed on brain matter and an addition to his growing compendium of the brain's chemical constituents. One of the most fruitful results of this work was the rediscovery of phosphorus in the brain, reintroducing the 1719 discovery by Johann Thomas Hensing.

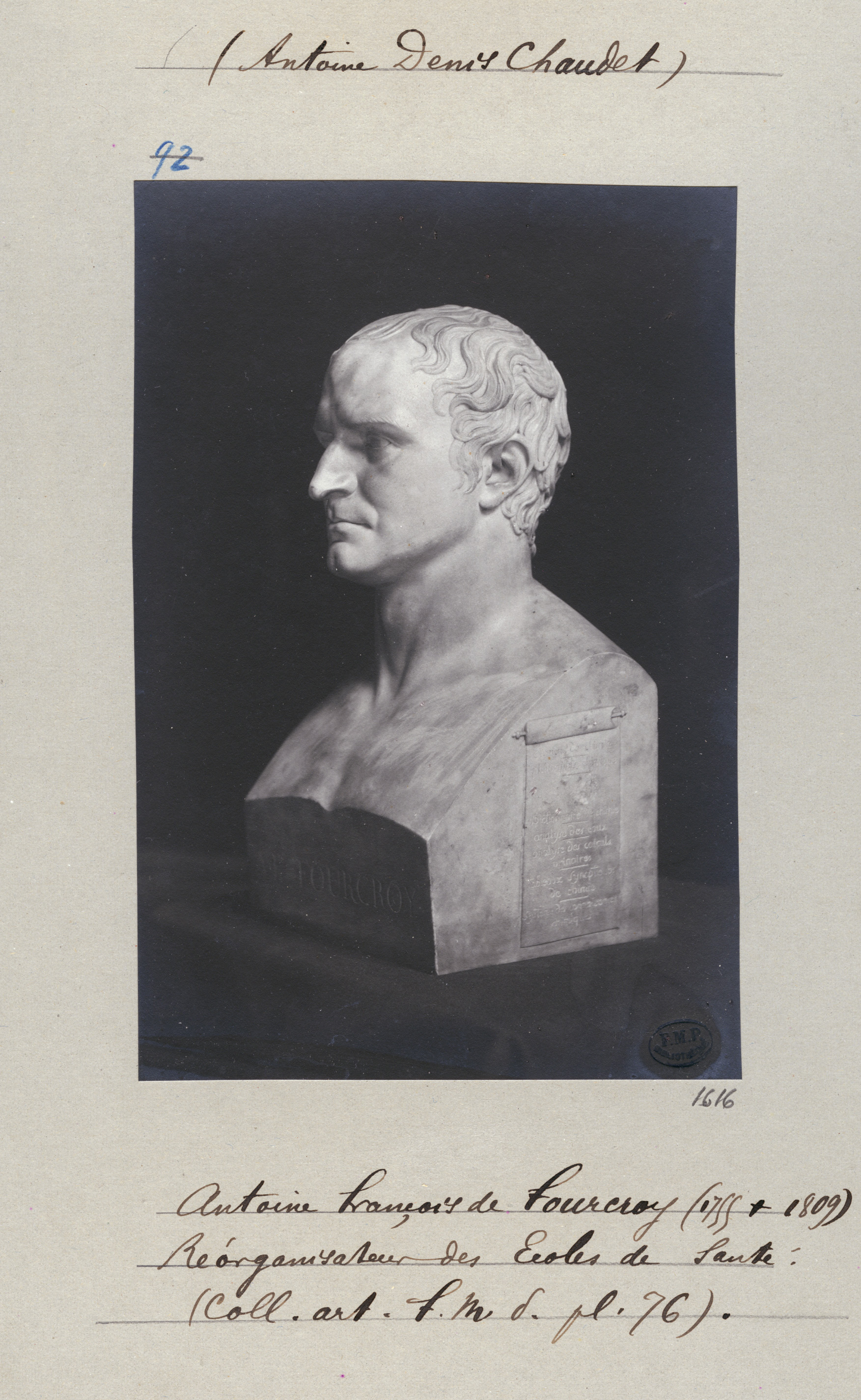
A marble bust of Fourcroy designed by Antoine-Denis Chaudet and completed by Pierre Cartellier in 1811.

Fourcroy also had a prominent role in developing law that would affect medical education in France. Fourcroy collaborated with physician Francois Chaussier to create a report that would be the basis of the Law of 1794, which integrated medicine and surgery and established health schools that taught both of these fields to all students. Prior to this law, medical education was heterogeneous throughout France, with several different colleges and universities operating under varying standards. The law pushed by Fourcroy unified the French medical education system under centralized authority and led to the issuing of national licensing years later.

=== Laboratory work and clinical procedures ===
While observing the 18th-century clinics of Fourcroy’s time, he observed several problems. Fourcroy noticed that physicians got accustomed to seeing the diseases of an individual patient but failed to consider a large number of cases comparatively. There were also practical problems with this idea, as physicians' individual practices were insufficient in accommodating large numbers of people with large varieties of issues. To deal with this Fourcroy proposed a program in 1791 to establish more effective clinical laboratories. Along with proposing these hospitals, and the idea that they should be staffed by young physicians well versed in modern sciences, Fourcroy wanted to include material obtained in post-mortem examinations in analysis of humans and how they are affected by disease. This idea was important in linking clinical observations to post-mortem findings, allowing development of new medicine. Although many reform proposals of the time were ignored, Fourcroy had a degree of success because of his political positions. Ultimately, Fourcroy was able to set up a teaching laboratory at the École de Santé in Paris, beginning the development of modern clinical laboratories.

=== Social Contributions ===
Outside the scope of his varied scientific work, Fourcroy was involved in the events taking place during the French Revolution, beginning his participation in 1793, where he strove to make a positive impact on French education. By the end of that year, after holding several positions in the National Convention, he was elected as the president of the Jacobin party, taking a seat on the Committee of Public Safety in the process, which he held for about ten months. He would subsequently hold other high-ranking positions and directorships in educational institutes and museums during the revolutionary regime and Napoleon's government as well. As an important counselor to Bonaparte, Fourcroy was appointed Minister of Public Instruction in 1802, responsible for education in France at all levels, which he held until his death in December 1809.

== Legacy ==
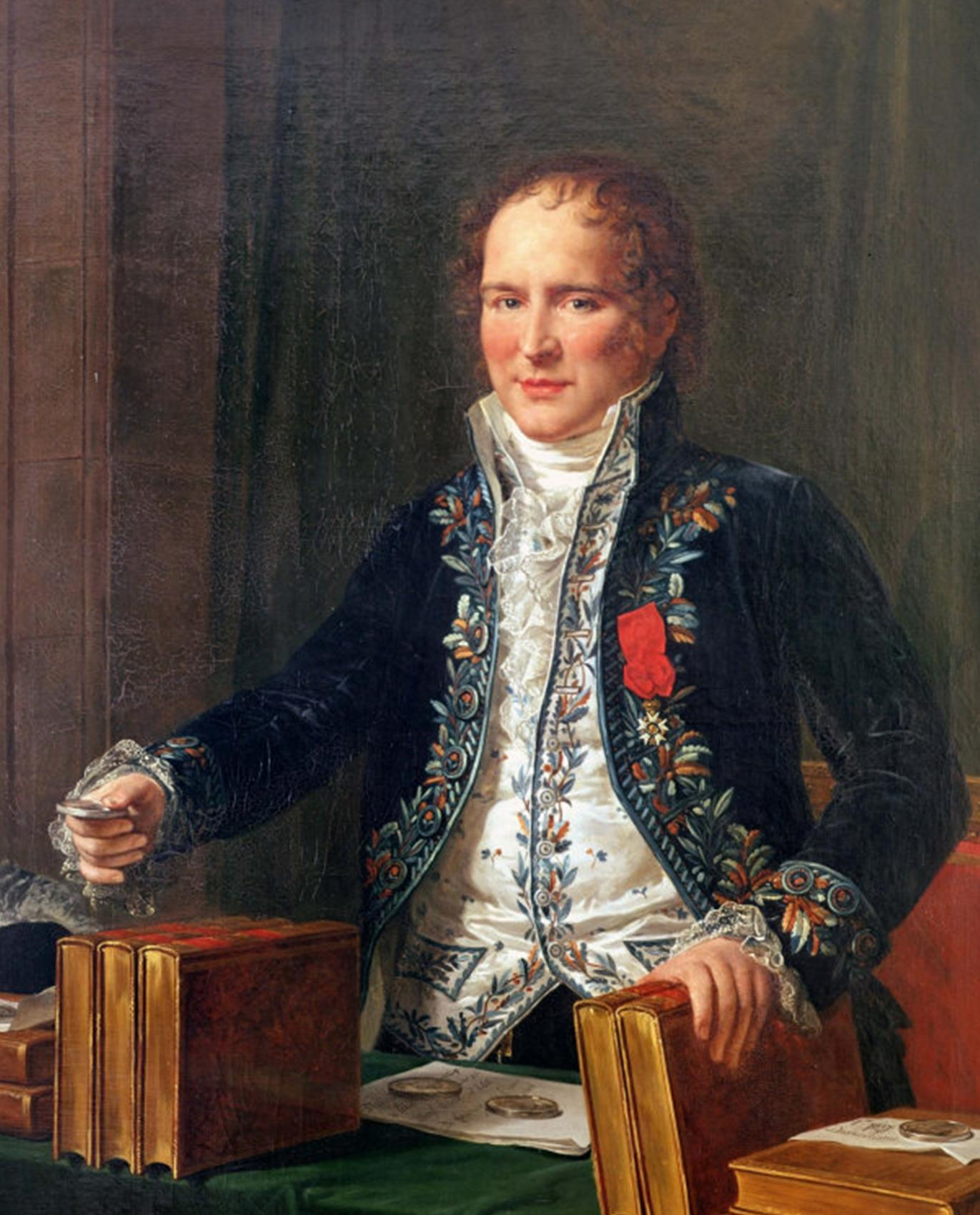
Portrait by Lemmonier in the Museum of the History of Medicine, Paris

=== "The Chemical Revolution" ===
Fourcroy was not the first to publish the phrase "Chemical revolution," even Bucquet described new developments in pneumatic chemistry in 1778 as a "great revolution in chemistry." However, it was Fourcroy who began to better describe the term by lengthening the time scale and broadening the map of nations that were contributing to the Chemical Revolution in his written works. It was Fourcroy who had initially noted the division that chemistry had undergone from natural history, concluding that the two studies no longer shared objectives nor methods. While natural historians of his era merely described and preserved that which they studied, as Fourcroy believed, it was chemists who now sought to uncover the most fundamental structures of the natural world by experimental analysis. In his publications, Fourcroy referred to many other contemporary chemists as well as those from other nations, proposing that the extensive chemical reform being done was a collaborative effort.

=== Awards and honors ===
In 1801, Fourcroy was elected a foreign member of the Royal Swedish Academy of Sciences.

On 16 December 1809, the very day on which he died in Paris, Fourcroy was created a count of the French empire. He is buried in the Père-Lachaise Cemetery in Paris.

Antoine-François de Fourcroy's 1787 publication entitled Méthode de Nomenclature Chimique, published with colleagues Antoine Lavoisier, Claude Louis Berthollet, and Louis Bernard Guyton de Morveau, was honored by a Citation for Chemical Breakthrough Award from the Division of History of Chemistry of the American Chemical Society, presented at the Académie des Sciences (Paris) in 2015.

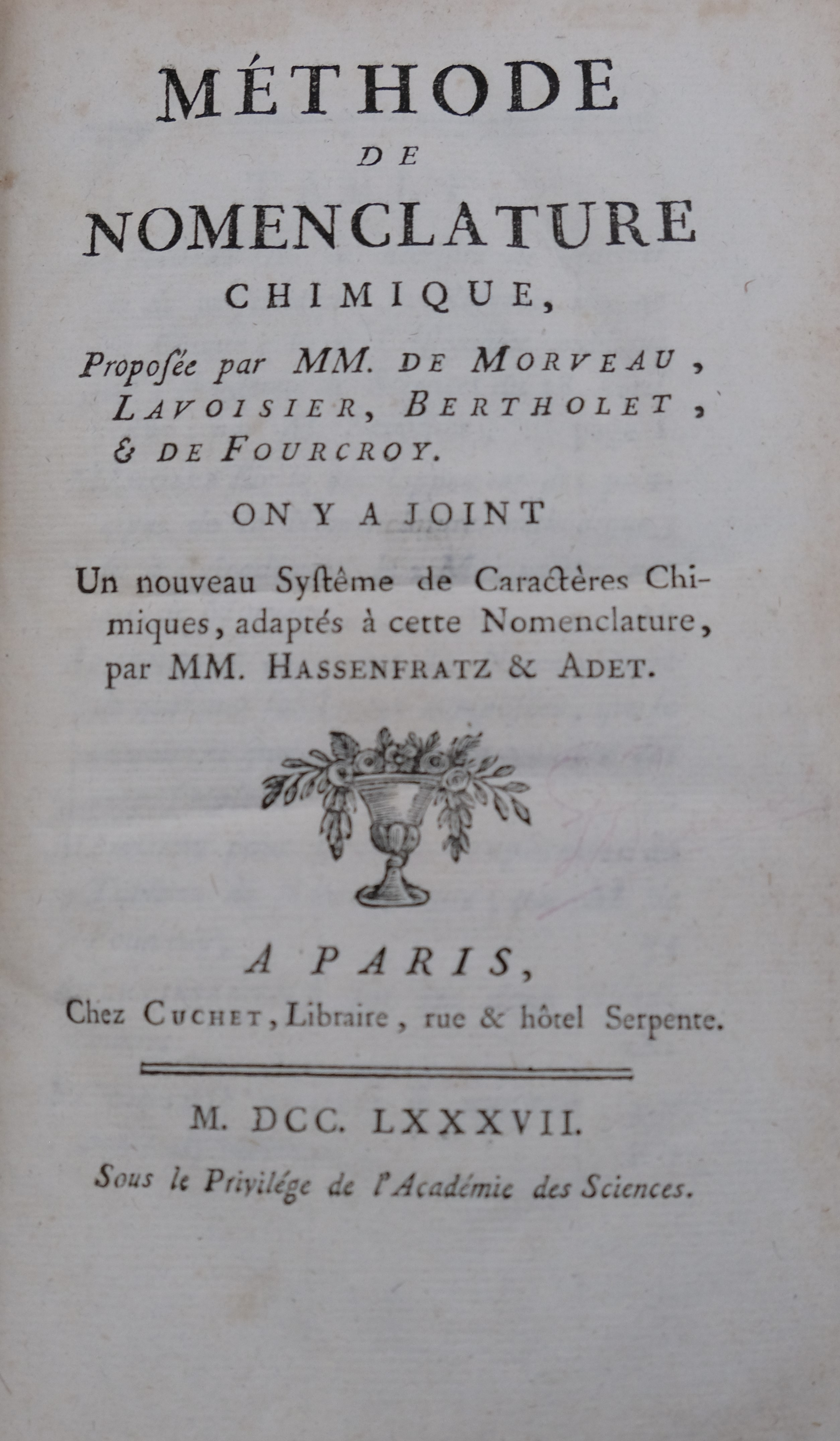
Title page of a 1787 copy of "Méthode de Nomenclature Chimique"

It is believed that Cape Fourcroy, at the western tip of Bathurst Island, Northern Territory, Australia, is named after Fourcroy. The cape was named during Baudin's expedition to Australia, and it is known that Baudin had a copy of one of Fourcroy's texts with him on the Géographe.

=== Controversy ===
By his conduct as a member of the Convention, Fourcroy has been accused of contributing to Lavoisier's death. Baron Cuvier, in his Eloge historique of Fourcroy, repelled such charges. According to the Encyclopædia Britannica Eleventh Edition: although active, though secret, participation cannot be proved against Fourcroy, "he can scarcely be acquitted of time-serving indifference." See the works in the Bibliography below for other opinions.

=== Modern references ===
In 2014, PBS released a three-episode documentary series about the search for the basic chemical elements, highlighting seven historical scientists in particular. In episode one of The Mystery of Matter: Search for the Elements, "Out of Thin Air," Fourcroy's character is played by Yan Tual as he assists Lavoisier in his discovery of oxygen.

== Bibliography ==
- Louis Bernard Guyton de Morveau, Jean-Henri Hassenfratz, Antoine-François Fourcroy, Antoine-Laurent Lavoisier, Pierre-Auguste Adet, Claude Louis Bertholet Méthode de nomenclature chimique (Paris, 1787)
- Fourcroy, A. The Philosophy of Chemistry (1792)
- Fourcroy, A. A General System of Chemical Knowledge (11 volumes, 1801–1802)
- Kersaint, G. Mémoires du Muséum National d'Histoire Naturelle, Antoine François de Fourcroy, sa vie et son oeuvre, Editions du Muséum, Centre National de la Recherche Scientifique, 1966, p. 59
- Smeaton, W. "Fourcroy, 1755 -1809", Heffer & Sons, Cambridge, 1962, p. 58 – Discusses reasonable evidence that Fourcroy not only saved several physicians/scientists but also that he tried to save Lavoisier at the cost of his own safety
