= François Chaussier =

French anatomist

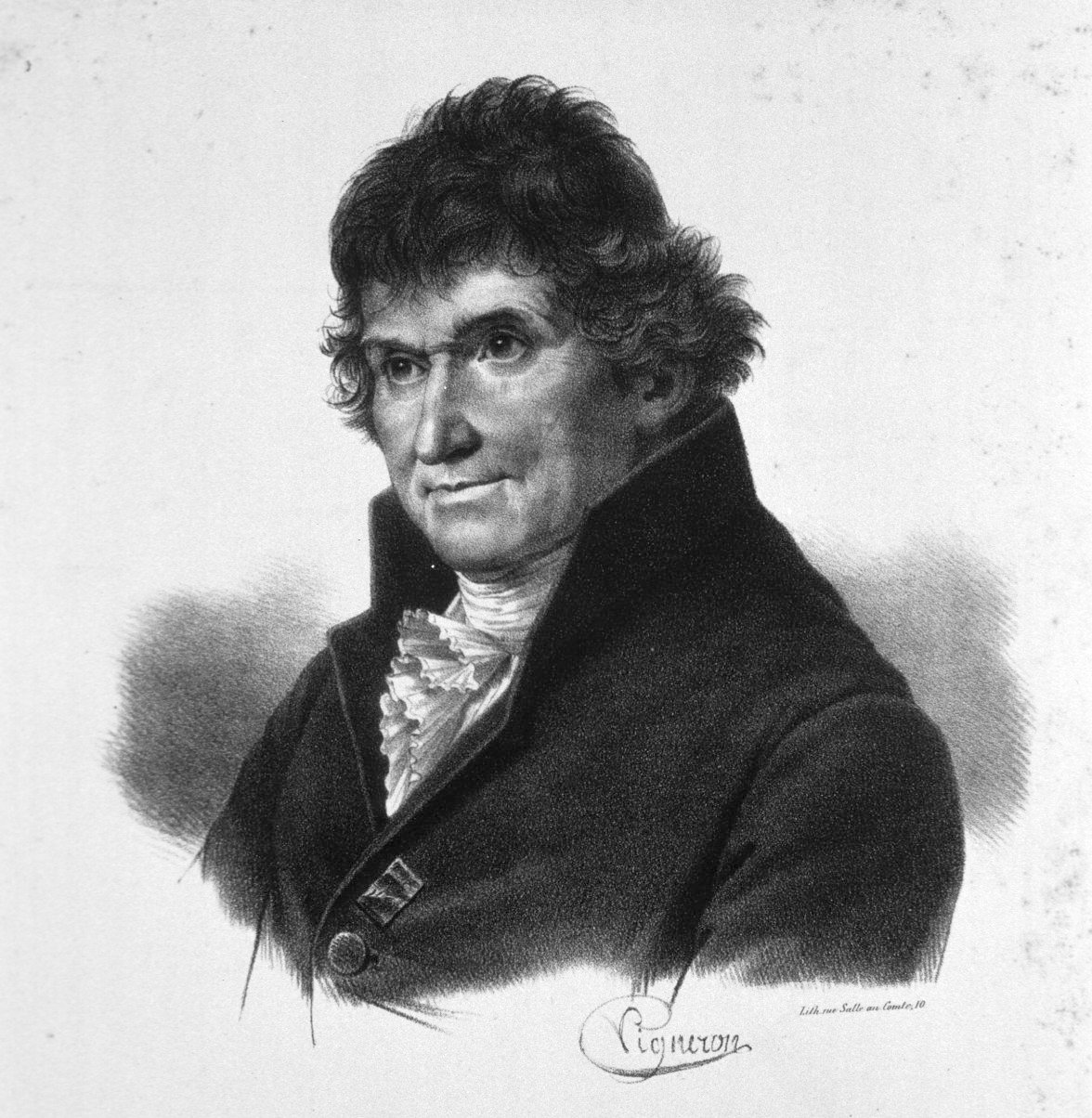
- Born: 2 July 1746; Dijon
- Died: 19 June 1828 (aged 81)
- Scientific career
- Fields: anatomist

François Chaussier (2 July 1746 – 19 June 1828) was a French anatomist who was a native of Dijon. His name is associated with the Prix Chaussier (Chaussier Prize).

He studied medicine in Besançon, later returning to Dijon, where he worked as a hospital physician. During this time he performed pioneer research in the field of forensic medicine. In 1780 he became a professor of anatomy.

In 1794 he was summoned to Paris by Antoine-François Fourcroy (1755–1809), being given the responsibility of drafting a report on the establishment of learning institutions of health. This report was presented to the National Convention on 27 November 1794.

Afterwards, Chaussier remained in Paris where he became a professor at the École Polytechnique, and a chief obstetrician at the Paris Maternité, where he was a colleague of Jean-Louis Baudelocque (1745–1810). In 1822 Chaussier was elected as a member of the Académie des sciences.

Chaussier is credited for introducing a procedure for revival of "near-dead" newborns. He also performed a descriptive survey of all muscles in the human body, and developed a new system of designation for muscles. He also conducted early investigations of neuralgia.

== Associated eponyms ==
- "Chaussier's areola": A ring of indurated tissue surrounding the lesion of cutaneous anthrax.
- "Chaussier's line": Anteroposterior raphe of the corpus callosum.
- "Chaussier's sign": Severe pain in the epigastric region, a premonitory symptom of eclampsia.

== Selected publications ==
- Tables synoptiques d'anatomie (Synoptic tables of Anatomy); (1799-1816)
- Manuel médico-légal des poisons (Handbook of poisons in forensic medicine); (1824)
- Recueil de mémoires, consultations, et rapports sur divers objets de médecine légale (Collection of memoirs, consultations, and reports on various objects of forensic medicine); (1824)
- Mémoire médico-légal sur la viabilité de l'enfant naissant (Memoir of forensic medicine on the viability of childbirth); (1826)
