= Marie Koré =

Ivory Coast independence fighter

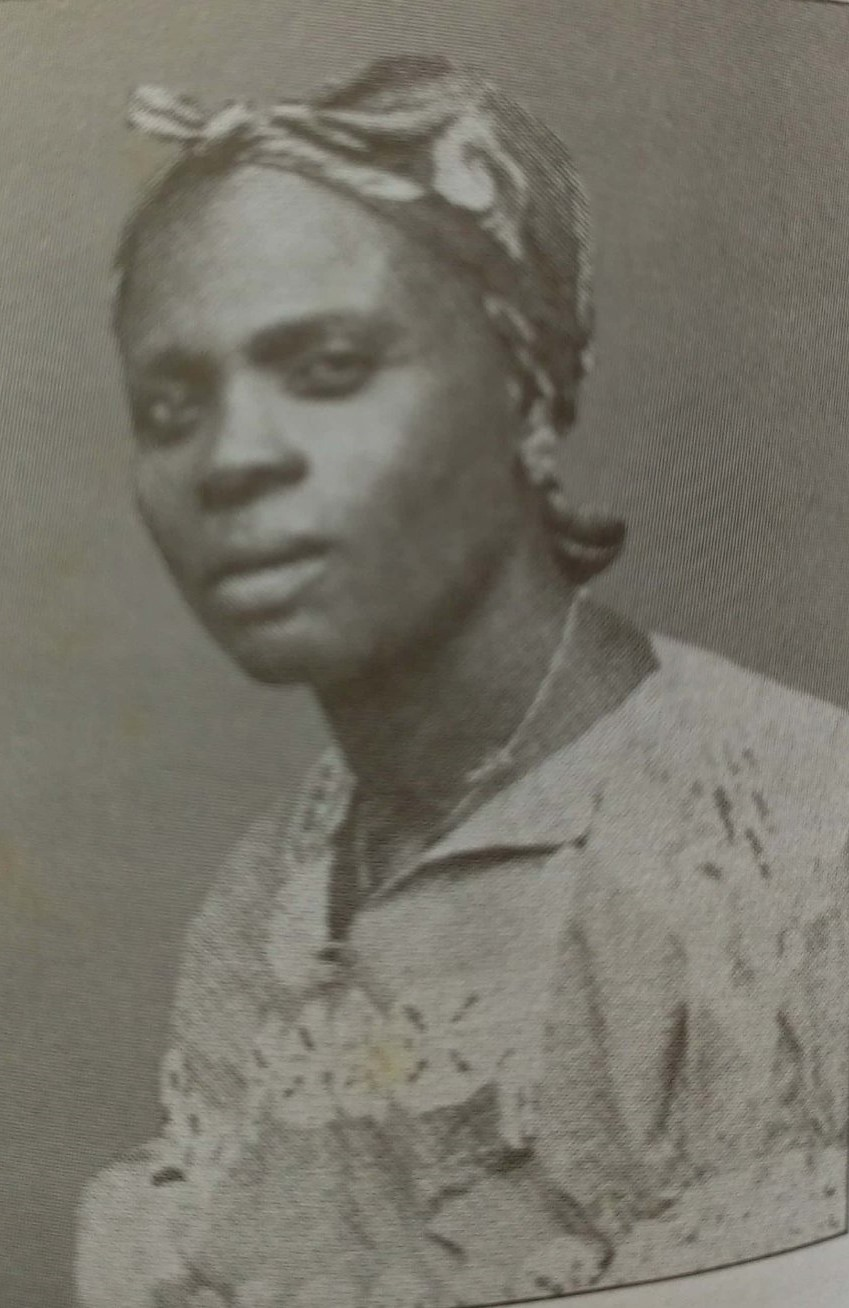
- Born: Zogbo Céza Galo Marie; 1910 or 1912; Gboguhé
- Died: 1953
- Known for: Opposition to French colonialism
- Spouse: René Sery Koré
- Children: 1

Marie Koré born Zogbo Céza Galo Marie (died 1953) was an Ivory Coast independence fighter. She was arrested while leading the Women's march on Grand-Bassam on 24 December 1949. She died young and she has appeared on her country's banknotes. One poll said that she was the most well known woman in the Ivory Coast.

== Life ==
She was born in 1912 or maybe 1910. She came from a village which is now part of a settlement named Gohra near the town of Gboguhé. She went to Basse-Côte, where she met and married a Frenchman but they were soon divorced because of her politics.

She started an Allocodrome in Treichville which is a restaurant that serves fried plantain. She met René Sery Koré who was already married but she bought presents for his wife and she agreed that she could become his second polygamous wife. However, as far as her supporters were concerned she was his only wife. By 1947 she was even more politically active and she was elected to be the President of the women's committee of her local party. She had already joined the Rassemblement démocratique africain which was formed in 1946.

Koré came to notice during the Women's march on Grand-Bassam in 1949. They were protesting at the arrest of men including Bernard Dadié, Mathieu Ekra, Jean Baptiste Mokey, Lama Kamara and her husband, René Séry Koré. The women set out on 22 December to walk the 40 kilometres from Abidjan to Grand-Bassan. They travelled in small groups to avoid attention from the authorities.

Their way was blocked on 24 December and she encouraged her fellow protestors to advance on the police who were using hoses to keep people back. She told them that they were used to getting wet and they should not back down for such a trivial reason. She led the way with her daughter, Denise, on her back despite the water and tear gas. She fell and she was beaten and arrested. She was given a two month sentence. She became an important figure of this fight for independence including Anne-Marie Essy Raggi, Odette Ekra, and Lorougnon Zikaï.

== Death and legacy ==
Koré died in 1953 after a trivial operation on a finger. The reason (or motive) for her death are unclear. She is a hero of the Ivory Coast and a banknote and stamp were issued featuring her portrait. A school is named after her and a prominent politician, Henriette Diabaté says that the statue that commemorates the demonstration includes a figure with a child on her back - and that figure is Koré.

In 2004 a radio station did a poll and Koré was voted the most well known woman in the Ivory Coast. In 2021 it was announced that a street in Belgium in a development named Nova City is to have a street named for Koré.
