= Anne-Marie Essy Raggi =

Ivorian politician and activist (1918–2004)

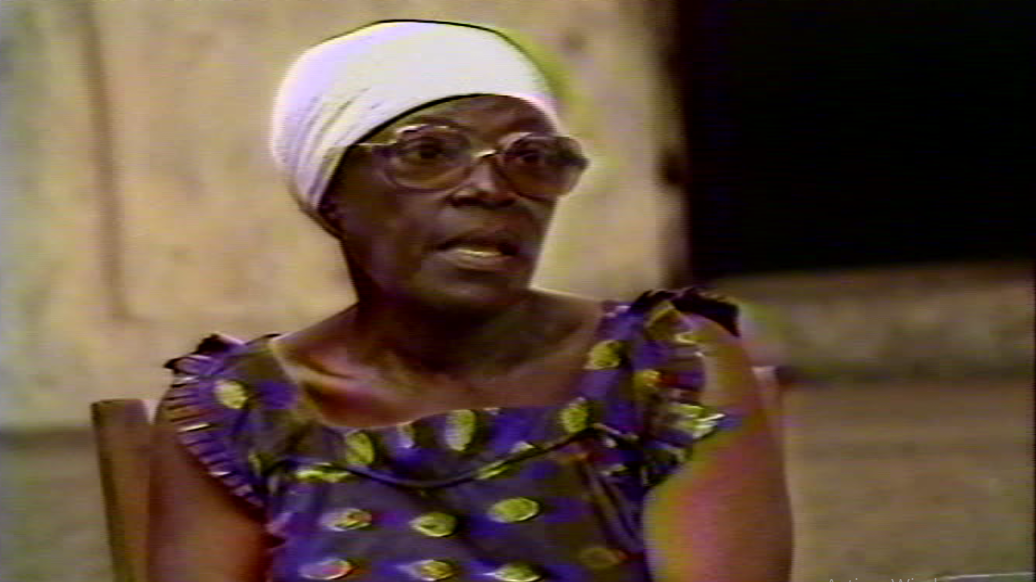
- Anne Marie Raggi during a TV interview.
- Born: 8 October 1918; Lauzoua, French West Africa
- Died: 19 October 2004 (aged 86); Abidjan, Ivory Coast
- Spouse: Louis Raggi

Anne-Marie Essy Raggi (née Thomas; 8 October 1918 – 19 October 2004) was an Ivorian politician and symbol of the anti-colonial struggle. She led the women's march in Grand-Bassam, was an honorary member of the national board of the Ivorian Women's Association, and president of the AFI of Grand-Bassam.

== Biography ==
=== Early life, education, and death ===
Anne-Marie Essy Raggi was born in Lauzoua, Divo, on October 8, 1918. She attended the school of the Sisters of Notre Dame des Apôtres in Moossou. She died on October 19, 2004, at the Avicenne Clinic in Abidjan-Marcory. She was also French by marriage to Louis Raggi.

== Activism ==
In order to demand the release of Ivorian political figures imprisoned by the French colonial authorities, Anne-Marie Essy Raggi led, along with other compatriots including Marie Koré, the march of women on Grand-Bassam, a protest movement initiated by Ivorian women, who traveled from Abidjan to Grand-Bassam from December 22 to 24, 1949.

Anne-Marie Essy Raggi is also known for her political and associative activism. She served as the secretary-general of the women's committee of the PDCI-RDA Sub-Section of Grand-Bassam from 1946 to 1974, honorary member of the national board of the Ivorian Women's Association (AFI), president of the Ivorian Women's Association of Grand-Bassam, member of the Economic and Social Council from 1976 to 2000, and deputy mayor of Grand-Bassam under Jean-Baptiste Mockey from 1980 to 1985.

== Distinctions ==
Anne-Marie Essy Raggi received several decorations for her actions throughout her life in France and Ivory Coast. She was awarded the Grand Cross National, officer of the National Order, and decorated with the Order of the Ram.
