= Lauzoua =

Lauzoua Lozoua
- Town and sub-prefecture
- Location in Ivory Coast
- Coordinates: 5°12′N 5°19′W
- Country: Ivory Coast
- District: Gôh-Djiboua
- Region: Lôh-Djiboua
- Department: Guitry

Population (2014)
  - Total: 23,348
- Time zone: UTC+0 (GMT)

Lauzoua (also spelled Lozoua) is a town in southern Ivory Coast. It is a sub-prefecture of Guitry Department in Lôh-Djiboua Region, Gôh-Djiboua District. Less than two kilometres (about one mile) southeast of town is the border with Lagunes District.

Lauzoua was a commune until March 2012, when it became one of 1,126 communes nationwide that were abolished.

In 2014, the population of the sub-prefecture of Lauzoua was 23,348.

== Villages ==
The six villages of the sub-prefecture of Lauzoua and their population in 2014 were:

- Adahidoukou (9,121)
- Dougodou (6,367)
- Gbassepé (597)
- Gbobleko (801)
- Lauzoua (3,630)
- Lauzoua-Carrefour (2,832)
