= Law of 1794 =

French law on medical education

The Law of 1794, derived from the Fourcroy Report of 1794, was enacted by the National Convention in December, 1794 in Paris, France. The law, stemming from a report from Antoine François, comte de Fourcroy, proposed the reorganization of the structure of medical education in post-revolution France and sought to lay the ground work for the institution of Hospital Medicine in France.

== Background ==
Following the French Revolution, France was in need of a new wave of new medical and healthcare professionals. Doctors and surgeons, primarily military-based physicians, were killed in large numbers during the wars and were in short supply to staff medical facilities after the fighting ended. In total, it was estimated that over 600 surgeons were lost during the course of the conflicts. The Revolutionary Government instituted after the war wanted a major overhaul of the French Healthcare System. With this in mind, the Legislative Assembly of 1792 disbanded most of the medical education resources in the country. Antoine Francois comte De Fourcroy, a French Chemist who was a former member of the Ancien Régime Academy of Sciences, was called upon by the National Convention. They assigned him the role of planning out a new medical education system that would provide a new way of teaching medical students. It was the goal of the Revolutionary Government to establish new "ecole de sante" (medical schools) more in line with the principles of the new government and to reorganized the disarrayed and fractured healthcare education system. After the revolution, doctors and surgeons in hospitals around France had an unprecedented number of corpses at their disposal and relatively lax oversight in terms of their dissection. This provided them with a strong opportunity to pathologize and classify new diseases and abnormalities from the plethora of dead bodies that occupied the hospitals. Fourcroy sought to take advantage of these newly accessible corpses for the purpose of educating new medical students with a more hands-on experience. He was convinced that an interaction between medical students and actual human bodies was essential to the medical education experience, stating that, in his new proposed system, students would "read little, see much, do much".

Seeing the work proposed by several of his contemporaries, such as Phillipe Pinel, Xavier Bichat and Rene Laennec, who sought to combine information gathered from surgery and medical practice together, Fourcroy proposed a report that encouraged the combination of medical education and surgical education as one comprehensive teaching model to give medical students a more complete education. Formerly, medical practitioners would only gain surgical license and education through formal surgical apprenticeships that did not exist within the tradition medical school. Following Fourcroy's proposal and incorporating the readily available hospital corpses, the medical education would be moved into the hospital, so that students could learn both medical techniques and surgical techniques simultaneously. Fourcroy wished to "eradicate the ancient separation between two estates (surgery and medicine) that has caused so much trouble", stating that "Medicine and surgery are two branches of the same science".

== Purpose ==
The report by Fourcroy, assisted in part by Francois Chaussier, was delivered to the National Convention in December 1794. Parts of the report were eventually integrated into the Law of 1794, which had several effects on the medical education system in France:

- Lead to the establishment of 3 new medical schools located in Paris, Montpellier, and Strasbourg.
- Integrated medical education into a hospital setting to give medical students a hands-on experience.
- Combined the teachings of surgery and medicine together within the hospital for medical students.
- Abolished the stratification of status between surgeons and physicians within the hospital setting and provided them with equal footing.
- Ensured that a steady supply of cadavers and dissection-ready bodies were available to medical students in the hospital.
- Mandated that "full-time, salaried" instructors were available in the hospitals to instruct students.
- Established a national scholarship program that would allow admission into the newly established schools. Scholarship awards were delivered based upon individual performance scores on nationally regulated entry exams.
