= Dairo-Didizo =

- Town and sub-prefecture
- Location in Ivory Coast
- Coordinates: 5°40′N 5°29′W
- Country: Ivory Coast
- District: Gôh-Djiboua
- Region: Lôh-Djiboua
- Department: Guitry

Population (2014)
  - Total: 47,344
- Time zone: UTC+0 (GMT)

Dairo-Didizo is a town in southern Ivory Coast. It is a sub-prefecture of Guitry Department in Lôh-Djiboua Region, Gôh-Djiboua District.

Dairo-Didizo was a commune until March 2012, when it became one of 1,126 communes nationwide that were abolished.

In 2014, the population of the sub-prefecture of Dairo-Didizo was 47,344.

== Villages ==
The 14 villages of the sub-prefecture of Dairo-Didizo and their population in 2014 are:

1. Babokon-Dida (846)
2. Béhiri-Dies (2,449)
3. Bouboudi (2,143)
4. Broudoukou-Kpenda (8,029)
5. Cochem-Baoulé (3,426)
6. Cochem-Carrefour (2,177)
7. Cochem-Dida (3,230)
8. Dairo (5,404)
9. Didizo (4,426)
10. Gly 2 (2,062)
11. Kopiédoukou-Gly 1 (750)
12. Wagana (7,524)
13. Zigrigbi 1 (836)
14. Zigrigbi 2 (4,042)
