= Guitry Department =

Coordinates: 5°31′N 5°14′W

Guitry Department Département de Guitry
- Department
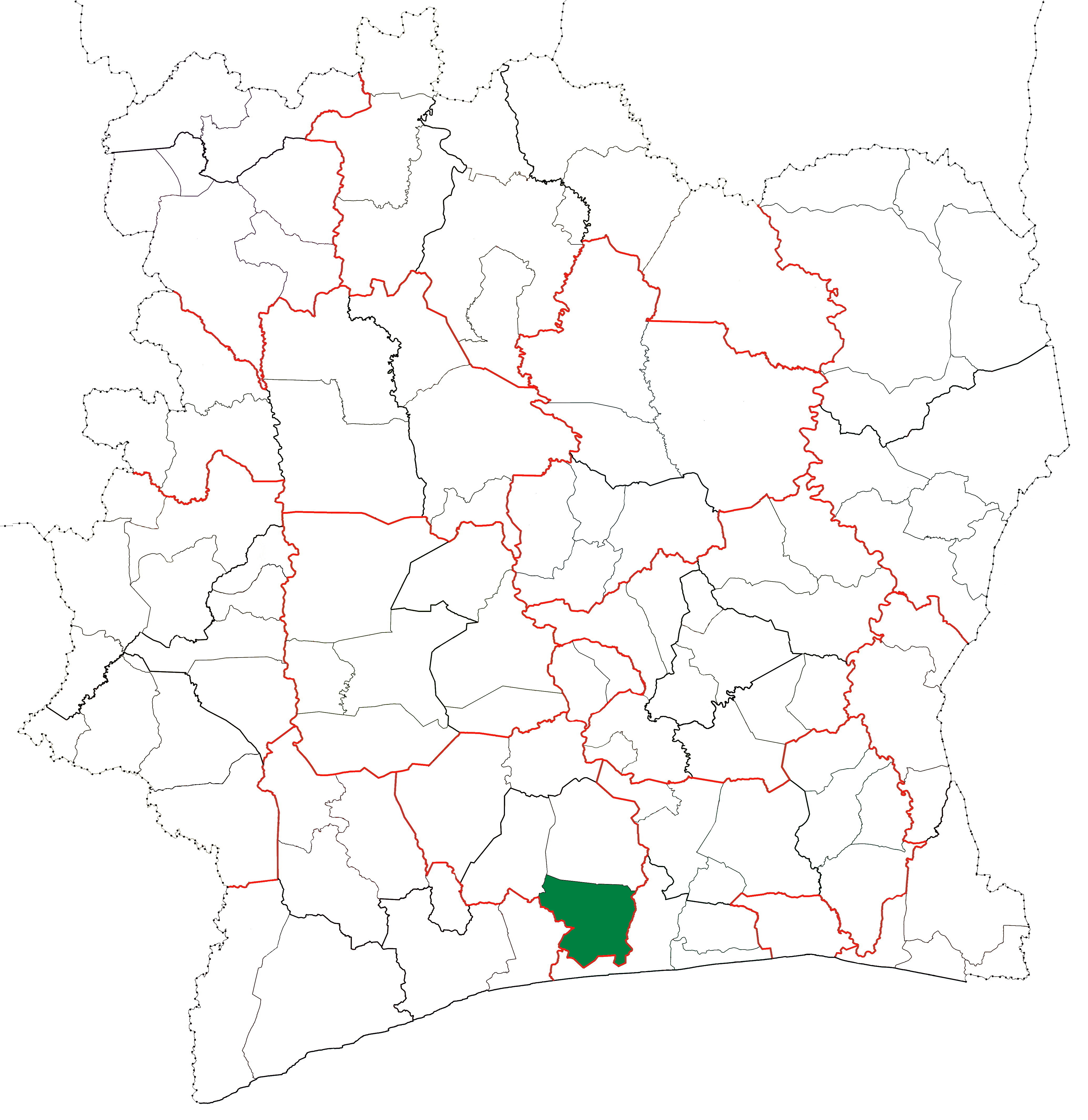
- Location in Ivory Coast. Guitry Department has retained the same boundaries since its creation in 2009.
- Country: Ivory Coast
- District: Gôh-Djiboua
- Region: Lôh-Djiboua
- 2009: Established as a second-level subdivision via division of Divo Dept
- 2011: Converted to a third-level subdivision
- Departmental seat: Guitry

Government
  - Prefect: Patrice Loua

Area
  - Total: 2,480 km^{2} (960 sq mi)

Population (2021 census)
  - Total: 197,236
  - Density: 79.5/km^{2} (206/sq mi)
- Time zone: UTC+0 (GMT)

Guitry Department is a department of Lôh-Djiboua Region in Gôh-Djiboua District, in southern Ivory Coast. In 2021, its population was 197,236 and its seat is the settlement of Guitry. The sub-prefectures of the department are Dairo-Didizo, Guitry, Lauzoua, and Yocoboué.

== History ==
Guitry Department was created in 2009 as a second-level subdivision via a split-off from Divo Department. At its creation, it was part of Sud-Bandama Region.

In 2011, districts were introduced as new first-level subdivisions of Ivory Coast. At the same time, regions were reorganised and became second-level subdivisions and all departments were converted into third-level subdivisions. At this time, Guitry Department became part of Lôh-Djiboua Region in Gôh-Djiboua District.
