= Women's march on Grand-Bassam =

1949 protest in Ivory Coast

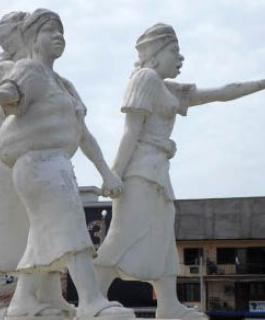
Detail of the monument to the women's march in Place de la Paix, Grand-Bassam

The women's march on Grand-Bassam was a 1949 women's protest against the French colonial rulers of Ivory Coast.

== History ==
In December 1949, anticolonial PDCI-RDA political leaders, imprisoned without trial in Grand-Bassam jail, started a hunger strike. Calling for their husbands to be released, a multiethnic coalition of women marched 30 miles from Abidjan to Bassam. Though official accounts at the time gave the number as 500 women, the actual number participating has subsequently been estimated to be two thousand. The women left Abidjan on 22 December 1949, organized in small groups to evade colonial obstruction. On 24 December, French soldiers stopped and beat women as they were approaching the prison. Forty protestors were injured, and four women were prosecuted. No prisoners were released.

The march was the subject of Henriette Diabaté's first book. In 1999 a monument to the women was raised in Place de la Paix in Grand-Bassam. The statue's dedication reads: 'To our valiant women who, by their historic march on Grand-Bassam prison on 24-12-1949, wrested the confiscated freedom of men.'

One of the leaders of the march was Marie Koré who was arrested by the police. She died in 1953 and she has been voted the most well known woman in her country.
