= Junior Tallo =

Ivorian footballer

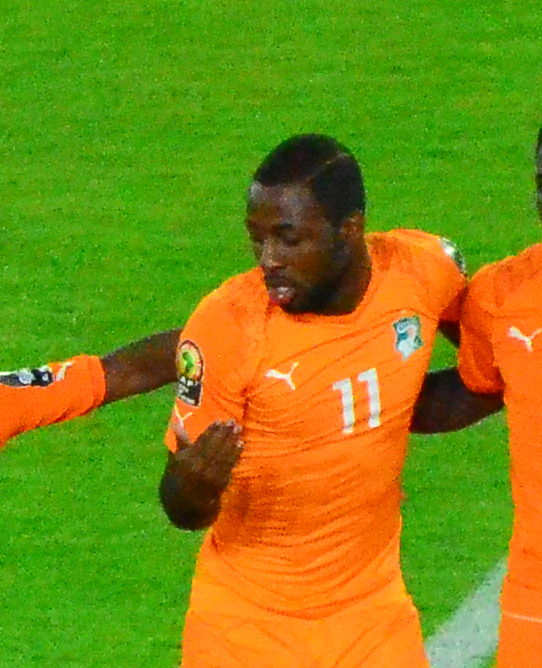
- Tallo playing for Ivory Coast in the 2015 Africa Cup of Nations final

Personal information
- Full name: Gadji Celi Carmel Junior Tallo
- Date of birth: 21 December 1992 (age 33)
- Place of birth: Magbehigouepa, Ivory Coast
- Height: 1.85 m (6 ft 1 in)
- Position: Forward

Team information
- Current team: Igman Konjic

Youth career
- 2005–2006: Stella Club d'Adjamé
- 2007–2008: Centre de Formation Cyril Domoraud
- 2010–2012: Chievo
- 2011: → Inter Milan (loan)
- 2011–2012: → Roma (loan)

Senior career*
Years	Team	Apps	(Gls)
2012–2015	Roma	3	(0)
2013	→ Bari (loan)	17	(3)
2013–2014	→ Ajaccio (loan)	23	(7)
2014–2015	→ Bastia (loan)	16	(4)
2015–2017	Lille	23	(0)
2017	→ Amiens (loan)	11	(1)
2017–2019	Vitória Guimarães	20	(1)
2019–2020	Chambly	6	(0)
2020–2023	Újpest	41	(9)
2022	→ Samsunspor (loan)	11	(1)
2023	Botoșani	4	(0)
2024	Dubočica	9	(1)
2024–	Igman Konjic	0	(0)

International career
2010	Ivory Coast U20	4	(1)
2010	Ivory Coast U23	1	(0)
2014–2015	Ivory Coast	8	(0)
Medal record
Representing Ivory Coast
Men's football
Africa Cup of Nations
Winner	2015 Guinea
- * Club domestic league appearances and goals as of 23 August 2023

Gadji Celi Carmel Junior Tallo (born 21 December 1992), known as Junior Tallo or just Tallo, is an Ivorian professional footballer who plays as a forward for Bosnian Premier League club Igman Konjic.

== Club career ==
=== Youth career ===
==== Chievo ====
Born in Magbehigouepa, Ouragahio, Fromager region, Tallo is a nephew of former footballer Saint-Joseph Gadji-Celi and son of Mathieu Tallo Gadji. He started his Italian career at Veneto-based club Chievo, where he played for the reserves in the Primavera from January 2010 to January 2011. He played the last five reserve games of 2009–10 season as one of the starting forwards. He played once in the playoffs netting a goal in the first leg of the round 16, which Chievo won 2–0 against Roma. The club lost to eventual champions Genoa in the quarter-finals of the playoffs.

In April 2010, Tallo received the number 49 shirt in Chievo's first-team squad.

Having played in pre-season friendlies for the first team, Tallo only played once in the reserve league for Chievo in 2010–11 season, in October. In November 2010, La Gazzetta dello Sport reported that Internazionale had agreed a deal with Tallo.

==== Internazionale ====
On 13 January 2011, Tallo was exchanged with Jakub Vojtuš of Inter. Facing competition from Simone Dell'Agnello (centre forward), Denis Alibec (forward), Mame Baba Thiam (forward) and Andrea Lussardi (wing forward) Tallo did not feature much in the reserves and scored two goals in six league appearances. He did not make any appearances during the playoffs. Inter was eliminated by Milan in the second round.

==== Roma reserves ====
In August 2011, Tallo was signed by Roma on a temporary deal. He scored 18 goals in 16 league appearances for the club's reserves in the group stage of the Primavera League to finish as the team's top-scorer, one goal behind Group C topscorer Gonzalo Barreto of Lazio. Across the 3 Primavera league groups Tallo ranked as joint fifth along with Mauro Bollino from the same group. The reserves qualified for the quarter-finals of the league playoffs directly as Group C winner. They were eliminated by Lazio in the semi-finals and Tallo did not score in the 2 appearances. The Roma reserves also won the 2011–12 Coppa Italia Primavera with Tallo contributing one goal against Juventus in the first leg of the finals on 8 March 2012. In the 2012 Viareggio Tournament on 20 February 2012 Roma was beaten by the Old Lady.

=== Professional career ===
==== Roma ====
Tallo was awarded number 26 shirt for Roma's first-team in March 2012. On 9 March, he was included in the first-team squad for the first time. He made his first team debut on 25 April 2012 against Fiorentina as a substitute for defender Gabriel Heinze. In the next match, he replaced Bojan in the second half as Roma trailed 1–2 to Napoli and went on to assist Fábio Simplício for the 2–2 equaliser. He made a third successive substitute appearance on 1 May replacing Bojan at half-time in a 0–0 draw away to Chievo. His three first team appearances came in the break between the regular season and the playoffs of the reserve league; Tallo never played for the first team again in the next four seasons, being loaned out to other clubs from 10 January 2013 to 30 June 2015.

On 22 June 2012, Roma purchased Tallo in a co-ownership deal from Chievo for €1 million on a four-year contract. In January 2013 he left for AS Bari on loan.

In June 2013 Roma signed Tallo outright for an additional €215,000 before sending him out on another loan, this time to French club AC Ajaccio. In 2014, he was signed by SC Bastia for a loan fee of €300,000.

==== Lille ====
On 15 July 2015, Tallo was signed by French Ligue 1 club Lille OSC for €475,000. At the end of the 2016–17 season, he was released by the club.

==== Vitória ====
In September 2017, free agent Tallo joined Primeira Liga side Vitória de Guimarães on a three-year contract.

He scored 2 goals in 21 matches in the 2017–18 season. In February 2018, he faced a disciplinary process from his club after he reacted with obscene gestures to insults and alleged racist abuse by supporters during a 5–0 defeat to Braga.

After the Christmas break in December 2018, Tallo and his teammate Welthon were absent from the training without justification. Vitoria then again started a disciplinary process being applied to Tallo for staying away from training, while the player flew back to his home country, Ivory Coast, and stayed there. Official sources confirmed on 25 January 2019, that the players contract had been terminated. The player also had to compensate the club.

Later Tallo wrote on social medias that he had terminated the contract because the club owed him money and that the club had behaved unprofessionally. Tallo argued, that the termination of contract with Vitória was due to "non-payment" of his salaries, stating that "he was not the only one to go through the same situation." After these statements the club announced it would sue Tallo.

==== Újpest ====
In mid-2020, Tallo was signed by Nemzeti Bajnokság I club Újpest FC.

On 17 October 2020, he scored his first goal for Újpest in the league. On 13 January 2022, Tallo was loaned out to Turkish TFF First League club Samsunspor for the rest of the season.

==== Botoşani ====
Tallo moved to neighbouring Romania to play with FC Botoşani in Liga I.

==== Dubočica ====
On March 15, 2024, Tallo signed with Dubočica to play in the Serbian First League.

== International career ==
Tallo played for the Ivory Coast in the qualification for 2011 U20 African Cup of Nations against Tanzania (twice, also his debut). and against Gambia.

After the U20 team was eliminated from U20 African Cup of Nations, Tallo was capped for the U23 team against Morocco.

Tallo made his debut for the senior national team, coming off the bench in a 2–1 win against the Democratic Republic of Congo during the 2015 Africa Cup of Nations qualification. He was part of the Ivory Coast squad that won the competition, appearing in four matches as a substitute. Tallo entered the final match with a few seconds left in the second half of extra time to be one of the five first penalty takers, but missed his chance from the spot kick.

=== International stats ===
As of match played 19 November 2022

Appearances and goals by national team and year
National team	Year	Apps	Goals
Ivory Coast	2014	2	0
Ivory Coast	2015	6	0
Total		8	0

== Honours ==
=== National team ===
- Africa Cup of Nations: 2015

=== Club ===
Bastia

- Coupe de la Ligue runner-up: 2014–15

Lille

- Coupe de la Ligue runner-up: 2015–16

Újpest

- Magyar Kupa: 2020–21
