= Lahouda =

Lahouda Laouda
- Village
- Location in Ivory Coast
- Coordinates: 6°13′N 5°42′W
- Country: Ivory Coast
- District: Gôh-Djiboua
- Region: Gôh
- Department: Oumé
- Sub-prefecture: Diégonéfla
- Time zone: UTC+0 (GMT)

Lahouda (also spelled Laouda) is a village in southern Ivory Coast. It is in the sub-prefecture of Diégonéfla, Oumé Department, Gôh Region, Gôh-Djiboua District.

Lahouda was a commune until March 2012, when it became one of 1,126 communes nationwide that were abolished.
