= Niorouhio =

- Village
- Location in Ivory Coast
- Coordinates: 5°46′N 6°7′W
- Country: Ivory Coast
- District: Bas-Sassandra / Gôh-Djiboua
- Region: Nawa / Gôh
- Department: Guéyo / Gagnoa
- Sub-prefecture: Guéyo / Doukouyo
- Time zone: UTC+0 (GMT)

Niorouhio is a village in southern Ivory Coast. It sits on the border of Bas-Sassandra and Gôh-Djiboua Districts. Half of the village is in the sub-prefecture of Guéyo, Guéyo Department, Nawa Region, Bas-Sassandra District, and the other half is in the sub-prefecture of Doukouyo, Gagnoa Department, Gôh Region, Gôh-Djiboua District.

Niorouhio was a commune until March 2012, when it became one of 1,126 communes nationwide that were abolished.
