= Doukouya =

- Village
- Location in Ivory Coast
- Coordinates: 6°25′N 5°33′W
- Country: Ivory Coast
- District: Gôh-Djiboua
- Region: Gôh
- Department: Oumé
- Sub-prefecture: Oumé

Population (2014 census)
  - Village: 14,881
- Time zone: UTC+0 (GMT)

Doukouya is a village in southern Ivory Coast. It is in the sub-prefecture of Oumé, Oumé Department, Gôh Region, Gôh-Djiboua District.

Doukouya was a commune until March 2012, when it became one of 1,126 communes nationwide that were abolished.
