= Gabia, Gôh-Djiboua =

Gabia
- Village
- Location in Ivory Coast
- Coordinates: 6°19′N 5°22′W
- Country: Ivory Coast
- District: Gôh-Djiboua
- Region: Gôh
- Department: Oumé
- Sub-prefecture: Oumé
- Time zone: UTC+0 (GMT)

Gabia is a village in south-central Ivory Coast. It is in the sub-prefecture of Oumé, Oumé Department, Gôh Region, Gôh-Djiboua District.

Gabia was a commune until March 2012, when it became one of 1,126 communes nationwide that were abolished.
