= Kosséhoa =

- Village
- Location in Ivory Coast
- Coordinates: 6°4′N 6°18′W
- Country: Ivory Coast
- District: Gôh-Djiboua
- Region: Gôh
- Department: Gagnoa
- Sub-prefecture: Galebre-Galébouo
- Time zone: UTC+0 (GMT)

Kosséhoa is a village in southern Ivory Coast. It is in the sub-prefecture of Galebre-Galébouo, Gagnoa Department, Gôh Region, Gôh-Djiboua District.

Kosséhoa was a commune until March 2012, when it became one of 1,126 communes nationwide that were abolished.
