= Gbadjié =

- Village
- Location in Ivory Coast
- Coordinates: 6°2′N 5°57′W
- Country: Ivory Coast
- District: Gôh-Djiboua
- Region: Gôh
- Department: Gagnoa
- Sub-prefecture: Gagnoa
- Time zone: UTC+0 (GMT)

Gbadjié is a village in southern Ivory Coast. It is in the sub-prefecture of Gagnoa, Gagnoa Department, Gôh Region, Gôh-Djiboua District.

Gbadjié was a commune until March 2012, when it became one of 1,126 communes nationwide that were abolished.
