= Kpapékou =

- Village
- Location in Ivory Coast
- Coordinates: 6°15′N 5°57′W
- Country: Ivory Coast
- District: Gôh-Djiboua
- Region: Gôh
- Department: Gagnoa
- Sub-prefecture: Ouragahio
- Time zone: UTC+0 (GMT)

Kpapékou is a village in southern Ivory Coast. It is in the sub-prefecture of Ouragahio, Gagnoa Department, Gôh Region, Gôh-Djiboua District.

Kpapékou was a commune until March 2012, when it became one of 1,126 communes nationwide that were abolished.
