= Dougroupalégnaoa =

Dougroupalégnaoa Dougroupalégnoa; Diligépalényoa
- Town and sub-prefecture
- Location in Ivory Coast
- Coordinates: 5°55′N 5°59′W
- Country: Ivory Coast
- District: Gôh-Djiboua
- Region: Gôh
- Department: Gagnoa

Population (2014)
  - Total: 47,083
- Time zone: UTC+0 (GMT)

Dougroupalégnaoa (also spelled Dougroupalégnoa and Diligépalényoa) is a town in south-central Ivory Coast. It is a sub-prefecture of Gagnoa Department in Gôh Region, Gôh-Djiboua District.

Dougroupalégnaoa was a commune until March 2012, when it became one of 1,126 communes nationwide that were abolished.

In 2014, the population of the sub-prefecture of Dougroupalégnaoa was 47,083.

== Villages ==
The 22 villages of the sub-prefecture of Dougroupalégnaoa and their population in 2014 are:

1. Boussoupalégnoa (1,040)
2. Diabouo (4,337)
3. Dikouéhipalégnoa (832)
4. Djatégnoa (414)
5. Djérégoué (965)
6. Dodjagnoa (2,952)
7. Donhio Maléhio (2,029)
8. Dougroupalégnoa (4,970)
9. Gbadjié (1,336)
10. Gnalégribouo (1,669)
11. Guibouo (1,745)
12. Guiguia (1,761)
13. Kobouo (5,982)
14. Kobrégnoa (927)
15. Mabouo (4,413)
16. Maguehio (2,716)
17. Mahibouo (1,298)
18. Niahirio (2,192)
19. Noaguihio (1,275)
20. Olibribouo (1,357)
21. Sakua (812)
22. Zokrobouo (2,061)
