= Bayota =

- Town and sub-prefecture
- Location in Ivory Coast
- Coordinates: 6°28′N 5°57′W
- Country: Ivory Coast
- District: Gôh-Djiboua
- Region: Gôh
- Department: Gagnoa

Population (2014)
  - Total: 54,125
- Time zone: UTC+0 (GMT)

Bayota is a town in south-central Ivory Coast. It is a sub-prefecture of Gagnoa Department in Gôh Region, Gôh-Djiboua District.

Bayota was a commune until March 2012, when it became one of 1,126 communes nationwide that were abolished.

In 2014, the population of the sub-prefecture of Bayota was 54,125.

== Villages ==
The 14 villages of the sub-prefecture of Bayota and their population in 2014 are:

1. Balayo (4,591)
2. Bayota (12,573)
3. Blouzon (391)
4. Boboloua (2,470)
5. Brihi (6,940)
6. Gbigbikou (1,416)
7. Logouata (2,555)
8. Nékéidé (7,836)
9. Solokou (629)
10. Téhiri (9,324)
11. Tiégbahi (2,551)
12. Yazermé (508)
13. Zahibohio (1,665)
14. Zigbohouri (676)
