= Aya Virginie Touré =

Ivorian politician and peace activist

Aya Virginie Toure
- Occupation: Peace activist
- Known for: Organizing peace protests during the Second Ivorian Civil War

Aya Virginie Touré, born Aya Virginie Kouamé, is a peace activist and politician in Côte d'Ivoire (Ivory Coast). She became known for organizing women in nonviolent resistance against President Laurent Gbagbo who refused to step down since he lost the presidential election to Alassane Ouattara. Touré worked to mobilize women as the Deputy Director for Ouattara's 2010 Ivorian presidential election. In 2016, she was elected as a deputy in the 72nd circonscription which includes the cities of Guépahouo and Oumé. Since at least 2014, she has been the Executive Director of the Petroci Foundation, the caritative organization of the Ivorian oil and gas company.

== Congress of Republican Women ==
In the Rally of the Republicans RDR, the ruling political party in Côte d'Ivoire, Aya Virginie Touré has been elected President of the Rally of Republican Women. (French: Rassemblement des femmes républicaines)(RFR).

She spoke out against Gbagbo and his inner circle of people who were allegedly sending taxpayers' money out of the country as their own personal wealth.

== Leader of civil war protests ==
Touré organized numerous peace protests throughout Côte d'Ivoire during the 2010–2011 Ivorian crisis. In an impassioned interview on BBC News, Touré compared the ongoing Second Ivorian Civil War to the 2011 Libyan civil war and asked for support from the international community. She called for military intervention to remove Laurent Gbagbo from power the same way Charles Taylor was removed in the Second Liberian Civil War.

=== Demonstrations ===
In December 2010, Touré led hundreds of women in a peaceful protest during the ongoing crisis in Abidjan. They banged pots to warn about the arrival of the militias.

On March 3, 2011, Touré led 15,000 women in a peaceful protest in Abidjan. Some were dressed in black, some were wearing leaves, and some were naked, all signs of an African curse directed toward Laurent Gbagbo. In the neighborhood of Abobo, they were met by security forces with tanks that opened fire on the women. Seven women were killed and approximately 100 were wounded. On March 8, International Women's Day, Touré organized 45,000 women in peaceful protests across the country. The women were met with youth armed with machetes and automatic weapons firing into the air at Koumassi. One woman and three men were killed in Abidjan by the army.

On March 8, 2011, Leymah Gbowee issued a statement of support for the peaceful protests of the Christian and Muslim women in Côte d'Ivoire and compared them to the women of Liberia.

On March 23, at the Economic Community of West African States (ECOWAS) Summit in Nigeria, a "One Thousand Women March" was organized by peace activists in West Africa in support of the women of Côte d'Ivoire. They wore white T-shirts and represented countries across West Africa including Côte d'Ivoire, Ghana, Liberia, Nigeria, Sierra Leone and Togo. They issued a press release and presented a position statement to the ECOWAS Heads of State.

On March 23, Goodluck Jonathan, President of Nigeria urged the United Nations to pass a resolution to take decisive action, saying instability posed a threat to security in West Africa.

On March 30, the United Nations Security Council Resolution 1975 was adopted unanimously, demanding that Laurent Gbagbo step down as President and allow internationally recognised President Alassane Ouattara to take power. The resolution imposed sanctions on Gbagbo and his close associates. The resolution was sponsored by France and Nigeria.

== See also ==
- Henriette Diabaté
- List of peace activists
