= Yopohué =

Yopohué Yopohua
- Town and sub-prefecture
- Location in Ivory Coast
- Coordinates: 6°24′N 5°50′W
- Country: Ivory Coast
- District: Gôh-Djiboua
- Region: Gôh
- Department: Gagnoa

Population (2014)
  - Total: 28,607
- Time zone: UTC+0 (GMT)

Yopohué (also spelled Yopohua) is a town in south-central Ivory Coast. It is a sub-prefecture of Gagnoa Department in Gôh Region, Gôh-Djiboua District.

Yopohué was a commune until March 2012, when it became one of 1,126 communes nationwide that were abolished.

In 2014, the population of the sub-prefecture of Yopohué was 28,607.

== Villages ==
The seven villages of the sub-prefecture of Yopohué and their population in 2014 are :

1. Bahompa (1,391)
2. Boko (3,110)
3. Didia (2,523)
4. Nagadoukou (6,816)
5. Sané-Gazé (3,969)
6. Yopohué (4,048)
7. Ziplignan (6,750)
