= Gnagbodougnoa =

- Town and sub-prefecture
- Location in Ivory Coast
- Coordinates: 5°58′N 5°50′W
- Country: Ivory Coast
- District: Gôh-Djiboua
- Region: Gôh
- Department: Gagnoa

Population (2014)
  - Total: 9,981
- Time zone: UTC+0 (GMT)

Gnagbodougnoa is a town in south-central Ivory Coast. It is a sub-prefecture of Gagnoa Department in Gôh Region, Gôh-Djiboua District.

Gnagbodougnoa was a commune until March 2012, when it became one of 1,126 communes nationwide that were abolished.

In 2014, the population of the sub-prefecture of Gnagbodougnoa was 9,981.

== Villages ==
The seven villages of the sub-prefecture of Gnagbodougnoa and their population in 2014 are :

1. Abohio (406)
2. Dalilié (589)
3. Dodougnoa (1,042)
4. Gnagbodougnoa (3,709)
5. Gnamagnoa (1,622)
6. Godélilié (1,069)
7. Kragbalilié (1,544)
