= Sérihio =

Sérihio Sérihi; Séryo
- Town and sub-prefecture
- Location in Ivory Coast
- Coordinates: 5°54′N 6°7′W
- Country: Ivory Coast
- District: Gôh-Djiboua
- Region: Gôh
- Department: Gagnoa

Population (2014)
  - Total: 42,545
- Time zone: UTC+0 (GMT)

Sérihio (also known as Sérihi and Séryo) is a town in south-central Ivory Coast. It is a sub-prefecture of Gagnoa Department in Gôh Region, Gôh-Djiboua District.

Sérihio was a commune until March 2012, when it became one of 1,126 communes nationwide that were abolished.

In 2014, the population of the sub-prefecture of Sérihio was 42,545.

== Villages ==
1. Valoua (4,091)
2. Wanéwa (5,428)
3. Gnatroa (21,879)
4. Inagbéhio (1,383)
5. Sérihio (6,926)
6. Valoua (4,091)
7. Wanéwa (5,428)
