= Tonla =

- Town and sub-prefecture
- Location in Ivory Coast
- Coordinates: 6°21′N 5°39′W
- Country: Ivory Coast
- District: Gôh-Djiboua
- Region: Gôh
- Department: Oumé
- Elevation: 227 m (745 ft)

Population (2014)
  - Total: 37,205
- Time zone: UTC+0 (GMT)

Tonla is a town in south-central Ivory Coast. It is a sub-prefecture of Oumé Department in Gôh Region, Gôh-Djiboua District.

Tonla was a commune until March 2012, when it became one of 1,126 communes nationwide that were abolished.

In 2014, the population of the sub-prefecture of Tonla was 37,205.

== Villages ==
The nine villages of the sub-prefecture of Tonla and their population in 2014 are:

1. Bléanianda (5,221)
2. Blékoua (1,939)
3. Boessovoda (2,311)
4. Bokéda (4,245)
5. Booda (5,671)
6. Dondi (2,637)
7. Gboménéda (816)
8. Tonla (7,300)
9. Zaddi (7,065)
