= Doukouyo =

- Town and sub-prefecture
- Location in Ivory Coast
- Coordinates: 5°50′N 5°58′W
- Country: Ivory Coast
- District: Gôh-Djiboua
- Region: Gôh
- Department: Gagnoa

Population (2014)
  - Total: 21,361
- Time zone: UTC+0 (GMT)

Doukouyo is a town in south-central Ivory Coast. It is a sub-prefecture of Gagnoa Department in Gôh Region, Gôh-Djiboua District.

Doukouyo was a commune until March 2012, when it became one of 1,126 communes nationwide that were abolished.

In 2014, the population of the sub-prefecture of Doukouyo was 21,361.

== Villages ==
The five villages of the sub-prefecture of Doukouyo and their population in 2014 are :

1. Guéyo-Bamo (3,024)
2. Oupohio (953)
3. Bamo 1 (10,188)
4. Daliguépalégnoa (3,746)
5. Doukouyo (3,450)
