= Dahiépa-Kéhi =

- Town and sub-prefecture
- Location in Ivory Coast
- Coordinates: 6°13′N 5°51′W
- Country: Ivory Coast
- District: Gôh-Djiboua
- Region: Gôh
- Department: Gagnoa

Population (2014)
  - Total: 18,173
- Time zone: UTC+0 (GMT)

Dahiépa-Kéhi is a town in south-central Ivory Coast. It is a sub-prefecture of Gagnoa Department in Gôh Region, Gôh-Djiboua District.

Dahiépa-Kéhi was a commune until March 2012, when it became one of 1,126 communes nationwide that were abolished.

In 2014, the population of the sub-prefecture of Dahiépa-Kéhi was 18,173.

== Villages ==
1. Badiépa (1,344)
2. Bayékou-Bassi (771)
3. Biakou (3,020)
4. Dahiépa-Kéhi (1,880)
5. Djédjédigbeupa (786)
6. Dobrépa-Koussépa (910)
7. Kéhi-Gbahi (1,719)
8. Magbéhigouépa (2,272)
9. Pissékou (4,665)
10. Zégrépa (806)
