= Guépahouo =

- Town and sub-prefecture
- Location in Ivory Coast
- Coordinates: 6°28′N 5°42′W
- Country: Ivory Coast
- District: Gôh-Djiboua
- Region: Gôh
- Department: Oumé

Area
  - Total: 182 km^{2} (70 sq mi)

Population (2021 census)
  - Total: 28,007
  - Density: 154/km^{2} (399/sq mi)
  - Town: 20,143
- (2014 census)
- Time zone: UTC+0 (GMT)

Guépahouo is a town in south-central Ivory Coast. It is a sub-prefecture of Oumé Department in Gôh Region, Gôh-Djiboua District.

Guépahouo was a commune until March 2012, when it became one of 1,126 communes nationwide that were abolished.

In 2021, the population of the sub-prefecture of Guépahouo was 28,007.

== Villages ==
The six villages of the sub-prefecture of Guépahouo and their population in 2014 are:

1. Bodiba (2,150)
2. Digbohouo (2,141)
3. Donsohouo (4,080)
4. Douagbo (802)
5. Guépahouo (20,143)
6. Sakahouo (4,482)
