= Dignago =

- Town and sub-prefecture
- Location in Ivory Coast
- Coordinates: 6°18′N 6°17′W
- Country: Ivory Coast
- District: Gôh-Djiboua
- Region: Gôh
- Department: Gagnoa

Population (2014)
  - Total: 32,387
- Time zone: UTC+0 (GMT)

Dignago is a town in south-central Ivory Coast. It is a sub-prefecture of Gagnoa Department in Gôh Region, Gôh-Djiboua District.

Dignago was a commune until March 2012, when it became one of 1,126 communes nationwide that were abolished.
