= Galebre-Galébouo =

- Town and sub-prefecture
- Location in Ivory Coast
- Coordinates: 6°28′N 5°43′W
- Country: Ivory Coast
- District: Gôh-Djiboua
- Region: Gôh
- Department: Gagnoa

Area
  - Total: 398 km^{2} (154 sq mi)

Population (2021 census)
  - Total: 38,550
  - Density: 96.9/km^{2} (251/sq mi)
  - Town: 16,389
- (2014 census)
- Time zone: UTC+0 (GMT)

Galebre-Galébouo is a town on the south-central Ivory Coast. It is a sub-prefecture of the Gagnoa Department in the Gôh Region, Gôh-Djiboua District.

Galebre-Galébouo was a commune until March 2012, when it became one of 1,126 communes nationwide that were abolished.

In 2021, the population of the sub-prefecture of Galebre-Galébouo was 38,550.

== Villages ==
The five villages of the sub-prefecture of Galebre-Galébouo and their population in 2014 are:

1. Galébré/Galebouo (16,389)
2. Gbogouahio (2,805)
3. Gnigbawa (1,636)
4. Kosséhoa (3,150)
5. Onahio (9,289)
