= Gabia =

Gabia or Gabias may refer to:

- Gabia, Gôh-Djiboua, Ivory Coast
- Gabia, Sassandra-Marahoué, Ivory Coast
- Las Gabias, Granada, Spain
- André Gabias, politician from Quebec, Canada
- Yves Gabias, politician from Quebec, Canada
