= Ouragahio =

- Town, sub-prefecture, and commune
- Location in Ivory Coast
- Coordinates: 6°27′N 5°52′W
- Country: Ivory Coast
- District: Gôh-Djiboua
- Region: Gôh
- Department: Gagnoa

Population (2014)
  - Total: 36,364
- Time zone: UTC+0 (GMT)

Ouragahio is a town in south-central Ivory Coast. It is a sub-prefecture and commune of Gagnoa Department in Gôh Region, Gôh-Djiboua District.

Ivory Coast international footballers Wilfried Singo, Serge Aurier, Franck Kessié, Siriki Dembélé and David Datro Fofana were born in Ouragahio.

In 2014, the population of people in the sub-prefecture of Ouragahio was 36,364.

== Villages ==
1. Bodocipa (896)
2. Broudoumé (2 005)
3. Gnaliépa (1 014)
4. Karahi (369)
5. Kpapékou (3 086)
6. Krogbopa (1 564)
7. Mama (2 208)
8. Oundjibipa (1 032)
9. Ouragahio (11 253)
10. Siégouékou (1 802)
11. Zébizékou (1 118)
12. Drayo-Dagnoa (4 841)
13. Izambré (2 242)
14. Kokouezo (908)
15. Nazia (809)
16. Tiépa (1 217)
