= Belmonde Dogo =

Ivorian politician

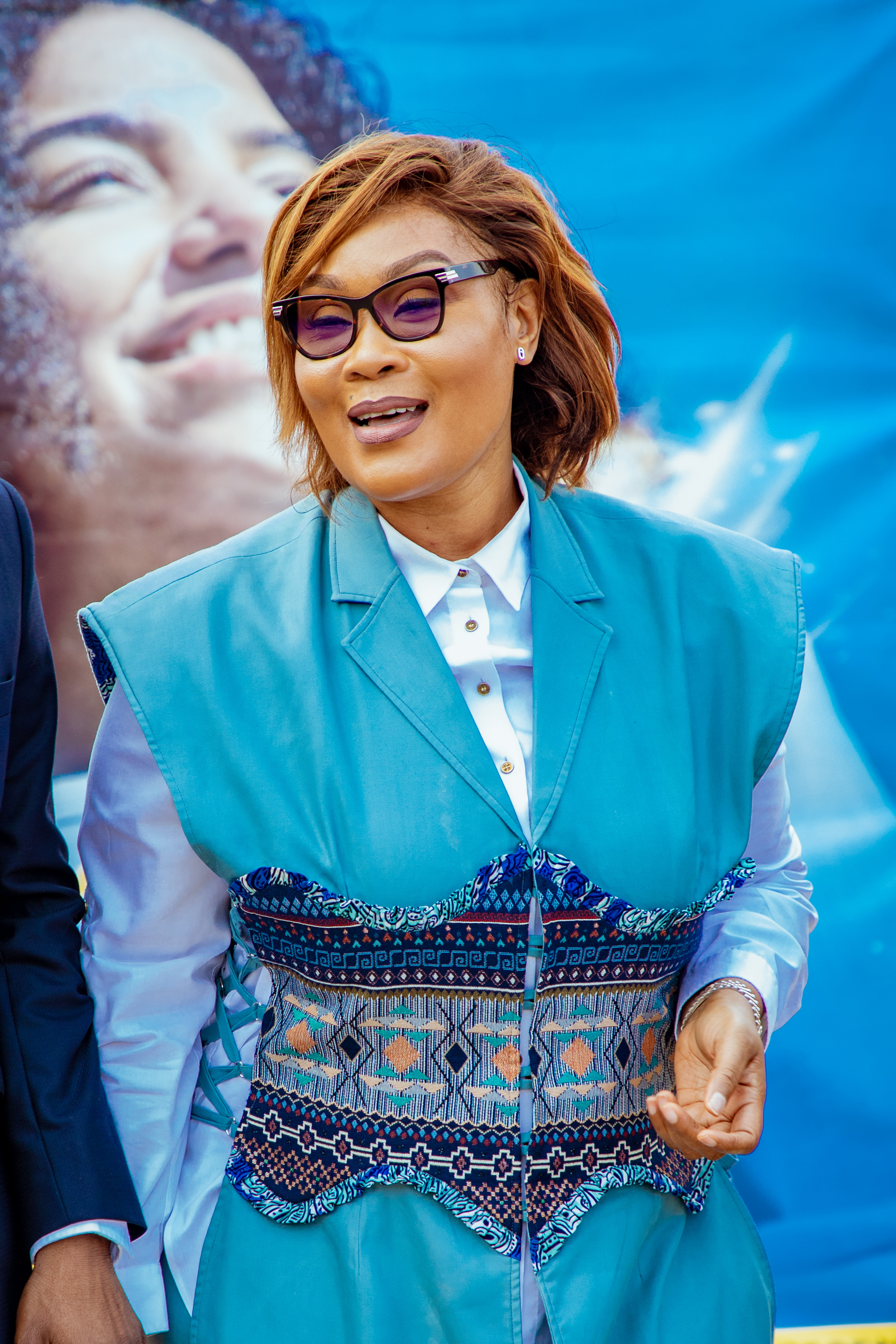

Minister of National Cohesion, Solidarity, and the Fight Against Poverty
- Incumbent
- Assumed office April 6, 2021

Vice President of the National Assembly
- In office 2016–2019
- Constituency: Dignago-Galébré-Guibéroua

Personal details
- Born: 1975 (age 50–51) Galébré, Ivory Coast
- Party: Rally of Houphouëtists for Democracy and Peace (since 2018); Union pour la Côte d’Ivoire (before 2018)

Belmonde Dogo (born 1975 in Galébré, Gagnoa Department) is an Ivorian politician.

Dogo was the vice president of the National Assembly of the Ivory Coast from 2016 to 2019.

On September 4, 2019, she was appointed Secretary of State to the Minister of Women, Family and Children, in charge of the Empowerment of Women.

She was appointed Minister of National Cohesion, Solidarity, and the Fight against Poverty on April 6, 2021.
