= GGN =

GGN may refer to:

- Air Georgian (ICAO: GGN), a Canadian airline
- Gagnoa Airport (IATA: GGN), in Ivory Coast
- GLOBALG.A.P, GLOBALG.A.P. Number
- Global Geoparks Network
- Glycin, a photographic developing agent
- Gotland Grand National, enduro race in Sweden
- Gurgaon railway station, in Haryana, India
- Gurung language (ISO 639:ggn), spoken by the Gurung people of Nepal
- Reformed Congregations in the Netherlands (Dutch: Gereformeerden Gemeenten in Nederland)
