= Guibéroua =

- Town, sub-prefecture, and commune
- Location in Ivory Coast
- Coordinates: 6°14′N 6°11′W
- Country: Ivory Coast
- District: Gôh-Djiboua
- Region: Gôh
- Department: Gagnoa

Area
  - Total: 566 km^{2} (219 sq mi)

Population (2021 census)
  - Total: 77,669
  - Density: 137/km^{2} (355/sq mi)
  - Town: 18,029
- (2014 census)
- Time zone: UTC+0 (GMT)

Guibéroua is a town in south-central Ivory Coast. It is a sub-prefecture and commune of Gagnoa Department in Gôh Region, Gôh-Djiboua District.

== Villages ==
The 23 villages of the sub-prefecture of Gagnoa and their population in 2014 are:

1. Basséhoa (2,349)
2. Bassi (1,276)
3. Bélam (1,921)
4. Béliéhoa (2,615)
5. Bilahio (4,018)
6. Briéhoa (2,370)
7. Djétéhoa (1,328)
8. Grand-Zia (3,188)
9. Guézem (1,821)
10. Guibéroua (18,029)
11. Kabéhoa (1,596)
12. Konahio (2,085)
13. Kpogrobouo (1,994)
14. Krissérahio (909)
15. Lébam (824)
16. Niaprahio 1(,568)
17. Ondjahio (1,931)
18. Takoa (1,306)
19. Zadiahio (2,441)
20. Zakoa (927)
21. Ziriwa (2,008)
22. Zohoa (6,594)
23. Zoukoubré (1,186)

== Climate ==
Climate data for Guibéroua
Month	Jan	Feb	Mar	Apr	May	Jun	Jul	Aug	Sep	Oct	Nov	Dec	Year
Mean daily maximum °C (°F)	34.1 (93.4)	35.1 (95.2)	35.1 (95.2)	34.3 (93.7)	33.3 (91.9)	31.6 (88.9)	30.4 (86.7)	30.2 (86.4)	31.4 (88.5)	32.5 (90.5)	33.1 (91.6)	32.9 (91.2)	32.8 (91.1)
Mean daily minimum °C (°F)	20.6 (69.1)	22.7 (72.9)	22.9 (73.2)	23 (73)	22.9 (73.2)	22.4 (72.3)	21.8 (71.2)	21.6 (70.9)	22.2 (72.0)	22.5 (72.5)	22.4 (72.3)	22.1 (71.8)	22.3 (72.0)
Average rainy days (≥ 1 mm)	1	5	10	11	12	13	8	7	11	14	9	2	103
Source: Storm247
