= Dogo (name) =

- Gender: Male
- Language: Hausa

Origin
- Origin: Nigeria
- Meaning: Tall, long, high
- Region of origin: West africa

Dogo is a masculine name of Hausa origins, West Africa. Dogo means "tall, long or high". It is usually given as a nickname to tall men and boys.

== People with the name ==
- Dilli Dogo, Nigerian surgeon
- Dogo Janja, Tanzanian musical artist
- Mor Dogo Thiam, Senegalese musician
- Belmonde Dogo, Ivorian politician
- Paa Dogo, Ghanaian musical artist
- Marcus Dogo, Anglican Bishop in Nigeria
