= Bonaventure Kalou =

Ivorian footballer (born 1978)

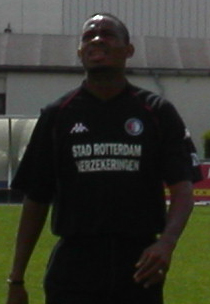
- Kalou playing for Feyenoord in 2002

Personal information
- Full name: Bonaventure Kalou
- Date of birth: 12 January 1978 (age 48)
- Place of birth: Oumé, Ivory Coast
- Height: 1.82 m (6 ft 0 in)
- Position: Attacking midfielder

Senior career*
Years	Team	Apps	(Gls)
1996–1997	ASEC Mimosas	35	(6)
1997–2003	Feyenoord	149	(35)
2003–2005	Auxerre	63	(19)
2005–2007	Paris Saint-Germain	55	(11)
2007	Lens	4	(0)
2007–2008	Al-Jazira Club		
2008–2010	Heerenveen	23	(2)
Total		329	(73)

International career
1998–2006	Ivory Coast	51	(12)
- * Club domestic league appearances and goals

Bonaventure Kalou (born 12 January 1978) is an Ivorian former professional footballer who played as an attacking midfielder. He serves as elected mayor of Vavoua.

== Club career ==
Born in Oumé, Kalou started playing for ASEC Mimosas in his home country, before moving to Dutch-based Feyenoord. He played in Rotterdam for six seasons as a first team regular. He mainly played as a winger, but also played as a striker when necessary. Meanwhile, his brother, Salomon, who came to visit him, impressed the Feyenoord staff and was signed as a youth player.

When Bonaventure decided to leave Feyenoord and try his luck in another European competition, the Ligue 1, at AJ Auxerre, Salomon was sent to Feyenoord's partner Excelsior on loan, before taking over his brother's role. Bonaventure played two seasons at Auxerre, where he developed further as a striker and an attacking midfielder as opposed to a winger. However, he still managed to score a similar number of goals compared to previous seasons. It was in this period that he talked to his brother, who still played at Feyenoord, into acquiring Dutch citizenship, which eventually was rejected by Dutch Immigration Minister Rita Verdonk. While at Auxerre, Kalou scored the winning goal in injury time in the 2005 Coupe de France final as they defeated his future club Paris Saint-Germain.

In 2005–06, he was transferred to Auxerre's Ligue 1 rivals Paris Saint-Germain. He scored one of PSG's goals as they won the 2006 Coupe de France Final; the second consecutive season he had scored in the final. PSG started to become a relegation-threatened team and he soon signed for another French team, RC Lens. The future looked bright for them, but they were surprisingly relegated at the end of the season. Kalou returned to the Netherlands in 2008 with SC Heerenveen, with whom he won the Dutch Cup in 2009. Heerenveen beat FC Twente in the final, and Kalou scored a goal. In the end of 2009, he was on trial at Crystal Palace and Le Mans, but both trials were unsuccessful. In February 2011, Kalou announced his retirement from professional football. He joined French lower league amateur club Combs-la-Ville for the 2011–12 campaign.

== International career ==
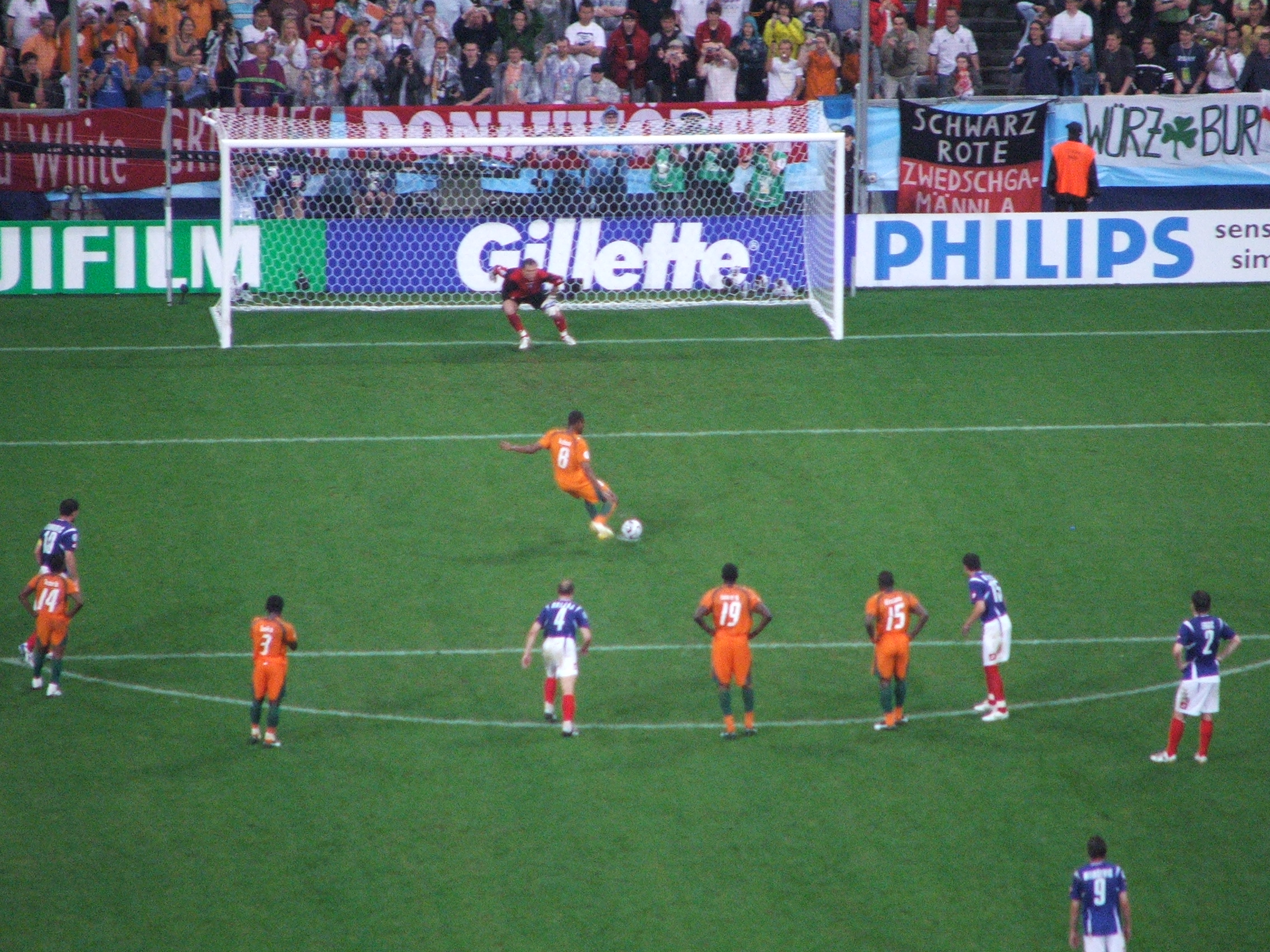
Kalou scores a penalty for Ivory Coast during the 2006 World Cup

Kalou played in the 1997 FIFA World Youth Championship, and was also in the squad for the 2006 FIFA World Cup for the Ivory Coast. He scored the winning goal in their final match, against Serbia and Montenegro.

== Political career ==
In 2018 Kalou successfully ran as an independent candidate for Mayor of Vavoua.

== Personal life ==
His younger brother, Salomon, also played for Feyenoord. In the build-up to the 2006 FIFA World Cup, there was speculation that the brothers could have become the first to play against each other in a World Cup match, as Salomon was attempting to gain fast-track Dutch citizenship. This did not happen and ultimately Salomon would also play for the Ivory Coast, though not until after the World Cup.

Kalou was formerly a Catholic, but told La Croix in 2017 that he had become an Evangelical Christian.

He holds both Ivorian and Dutch nationalities.

== Honours ==
Feyenoord

- Eredivisie: 1998–99
- Johan Cruyff Shield: 1999
- UEFA Cup: 2001–02

Auxerre

- Coupe de France: 2004–05

Paris Saint-Germain

- Coupe de France: 2005–06

Heerenveen

- KNVB Cup: 2008–09

Ivory Coast

- Africa Cup of Nations runner-up:2006

Individual

- UNFP Ligue 1 Team of the Year: 2004–05
