= Salomon Kalou =

Ivorian footballer (born 1985)

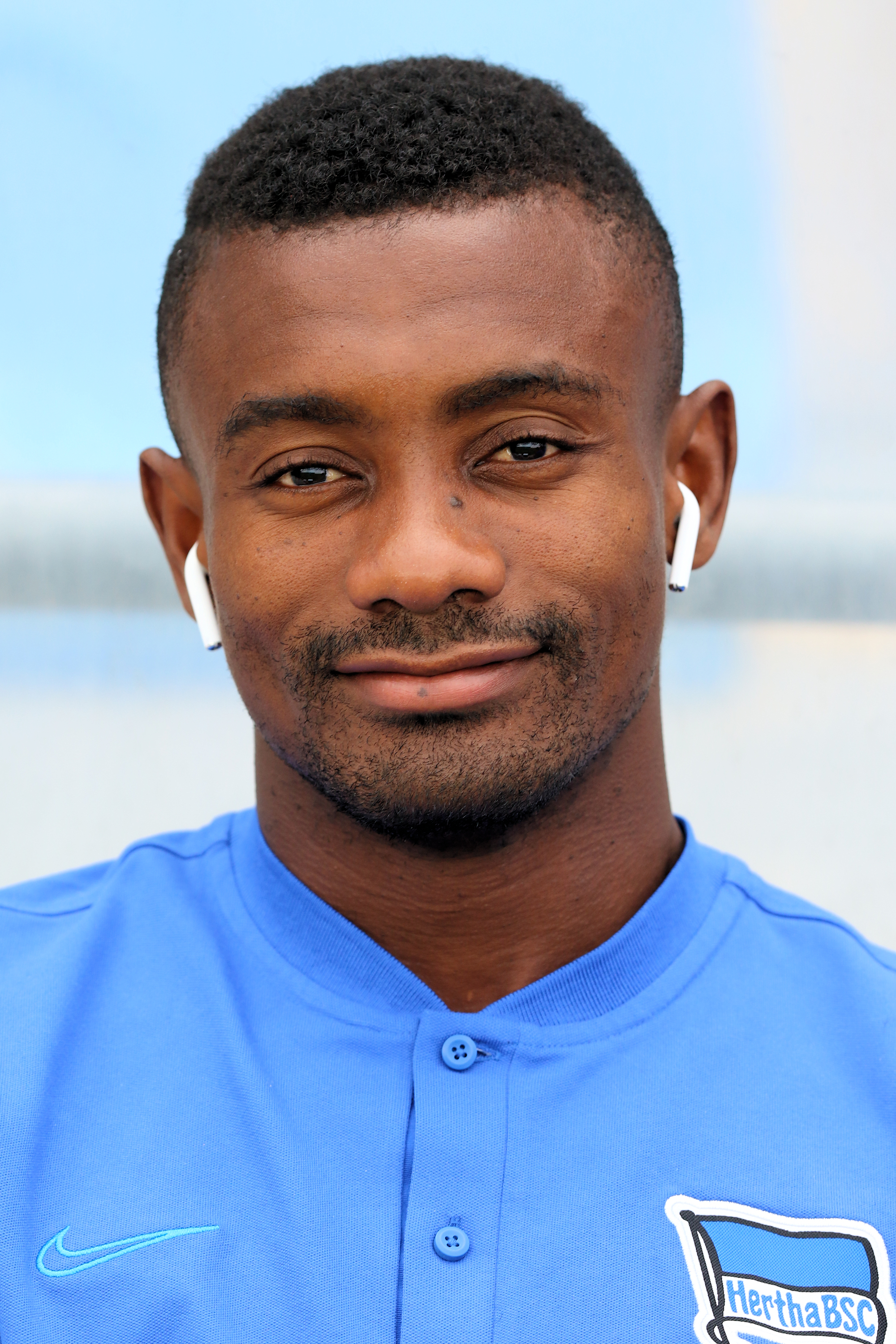
- Kalou with Hertha BSC in 2019

Personal information
- Full name: Salomon Armand Magloire Kalou
- Date of birth: 5 August 1985 (age 41)
- Place of birth: Oumé, Ivory Coast
- Height: 1.85 m (6 ft 1 in)
- Positions: Forward; winger

Youth career
- 2000–2003: ASEC Mimosas

Senior career*
Years	Team	Apps	(Gls)
2003–2006	Feyenoord	67	(35)
2004	→ Excelsior (loan)	11	(4)
2006–2012	Chelsea	156	(36)
2012–2014	Lille	67	(30)
2014–2020	Hertha BSC	151	(48)
2020–2021	Botafogo	25	(1)
2022–2024	Arta/Solar7	3	(0)
Total		479	(154)

International career
2007–2017	Ivory Coast	93	(27)
Medal record
Men's football
Representing Ivory Coast
Africa Cup of Nations
Gold medal – first place	2015
- * Club domestic league appearances and goals

Salomon Armand Magloire Kalou (born 5 August 1985) is an Ivorian former professional footballer who played as a forward or winger.

He started his career with local club ASEC Mimosas. He moved to Feyenoord in 2003, becoming a key player for the team in the 2004–05 and 2005–06 Eredivisie, scoring 35 goals in 67 appearances. Kalou moved to Premier League side Chelsea in 2006. During his six seasons with Chelsea, he won numerous honours, including the Premier League, the UEFA Champions League, four FA Cups and the League Cup. He moved on a free transfer in July 2012 to Lille, where he spent two seasons before moving to Hertha BSC for an undisclosed fee. He played 172 games and scored 53 goals in six seasons for Hertha. He played one season with Brazilian team Botafogo.

A full international for the Ivory Coast since 2007, Kalou amassed 93 international caps and represented his country at two FIFA World Cups, six Africa Cup of Nations tournaments and the 2008 Olympics. He was part of their teams that won the continental title in 2015 and came runners-up in 2012.

== Club career ==
=== Early career ===
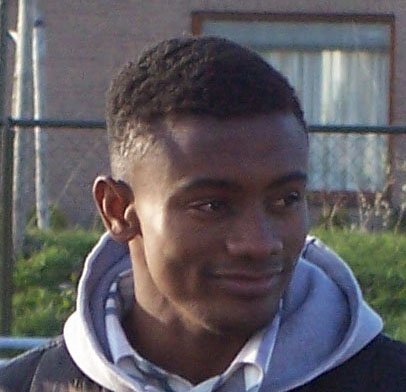
Kalou during his time with Feyenoord.

Kalou was born in Oumé. Like his older brother, Bonaventure, he began his career with local club ASEC Mimosas, before moving to Europe. He signed for Feyenoord in 2003 and in 2004, he was loaned to Feyenoord's "satellite club", Excelsior.

Kalou then returned to Feyenoord and played in the Dutch top flight Eredivisie for two seasons from 2004 to 2006. During his time with the Rotterdam-based club, he scored 35 goals in 67 league appearances, also winning the Johan Cruijff Award in 2005 as the most promising young talent of the season. Kalou, together with Dirk Kuyt, were affectionately known as "K2" by Feyenoord fans and the Dutch media, a play on the words of K3, a Belgian pop band.

Kalou was linked to several other clubs, including Auxerre, the French team his brother played for.

=== Chelsea ===
==== 2006–07 season ====
Kalou moved to Chelsea on 30 May 2006 for an undisclosed fee, believed to be approximately £9 million. Under contract with Chelsea until 2009, Kalou was handed the number 21 shirt.

Chelsea manager José Mourinho praised the young Ivorian as being hardworking, versatile, eager to improve and unafraid of the physical side of the game. Kalou admitted that he brought a camera with him to his first training session at Chelsea's training centre at Cobham because he could not believe that he was going to be rubbing shoulders with famous footballers like Michael Ballack, John Terry and Didier Drogba. Describing the experience, Kalou said "This was the dream moment of my life and I did not want to wake up and find that it was not real."

At Chelsea, Kalou played with his compatriot and Ivory Coast captain, Didier Drogba. Kalou scored his first goals for Chelsea in a reserve game against Portsmouth, bagging a hat-trick and earning the match ball in a 5–0 thrashing. He made his competitive debut in the 2006 FA Community Shield, and then scored his first senior goal for Chelsea in a two-goal win over Blackburn Rovers in the third round of the League Cup.

In December 2006 in Chelsea's 3–2 victory over Wigan Athletic at the JJB Stadium, Kalou scored his first Premier League goal, then scored his second league goal against Blackburn in Chelsea's 3–0 win. He also scored a 93rd-minute goal against Watford, putting Chelsea 1–0 up. He also scored a volleyed goal from 12 yards against Tottenham Hotspur in the FA Cup quarter-final, which ended 3–3. Chelsea won the replay 1–2 before progressing to the final with a similar scoreline against Blackburn. Kalou also came on as a substitute in the FA Cup Final win over Manchester United for his second trophy in England, having earlier come on as a substitute for Chelsea in the league Cup Final victory over Arsenal.

==== 2007–08 season ====
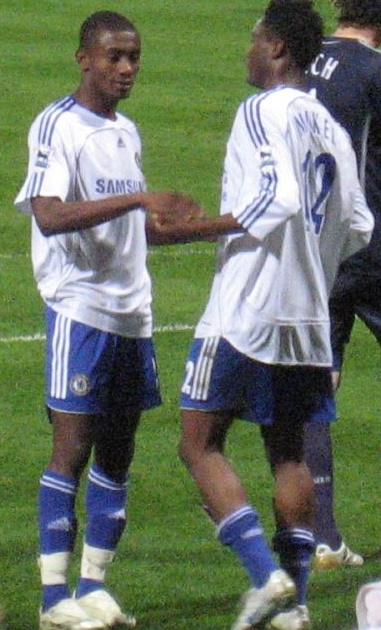
Kalou with Mikel John Obi

Kalou continued his good form into the season that followed, scoring his first goal of the campaign against Manchester City in Chelsea's 6–0 victory at Stamford Bridge and the opening goal against Derby County in a 2–0 win.

His last minute cross into the penalty area led to John Arne Riise scoring the own goal in the UEFA Champions League semi-final first leg at Anfield, which gave Chelsea a vital away goal over Liverpool. Kalou also scored with Chelsea's sixth penalty in the Champions League final in Moscow, where Chelsea lost to Manchester United.

==== 2008–09 season ====
Kalou did not feature much under Avram Grant's successor, Luiz Felipe Scolari, except during pre-season, because of his participation in the 2008 Beijing Olympics as part of the Ivory Coast national under-23 football team. However, he came off the bench against Manchester United on 21 September and scored a header after 80 minutes from a Mikel John Obi free kick. The goal ensured that Chelsea secured a point and kept their unbeaten home record. Kalou then scored two goals and assisted a Frank Lampard header on 18 October in Chelsea's 5–0 win at Middlesbrough.

On 14 January 2009, Kalou scored a tap in against Southend United in the third round of the FA Cup as Chelsea ran out 4–1 winners in the replay. Again he scored two goals against Middlesbrough, this time at Stamford Bridge on 28 January, a 2–0 Chelsea win, becoming a favourite under interim manager Guus Hiddink. These strikes proved to be his first goal in 15 Premier League games. He celebrated the goals by making a "handcuff" gesture, but denied he was supporting an Ivorian convictionist. On 25 April 2009, he scored the winner against London rivals West Ham. Kalou was an unused substitute in Chelsea's 2–1 win over Everton as the Blues won the FA Cup on 30 May.

==== 2009–10 season ====
Chelsea beat Manchester United to lift the 2009 FA Community Shield, with Kalou scoring the winning penalty. He scored his first goal of the 2009–10 season against Queens Park Rangers at Stamford Bridge in the third round of the League Cup, earning his team a 1–0 victory. On 12 October 2009, Kalou signed a three-year contract extension with Chelsea, keeping him at the club until the summer of 2012. He celebrated his new contract with an brace against Atlético Madrid in the Champions League, helping Chelsea maintain their perfect record in the competition.

On 24 February 2010, he scored a goal against Internazionale in the Champions League round of 16 first leg. His shot from outside the box was tame but an error from Inter goalkeeper Júlio César allowed the ball to find the back of the net in a 2–1 loss. In Chelsea's 7–0 win over Stoke City on 25 April, Kalou netted a hat-trick, though his second goal of the day had been the source of controversy, as it was very close to being a two-footed tackle. Kalou scored Chelsea's third of eight goals on the last day of the season against Wigan, as the Blues were crowned champions.

==== 2010–11 season ====
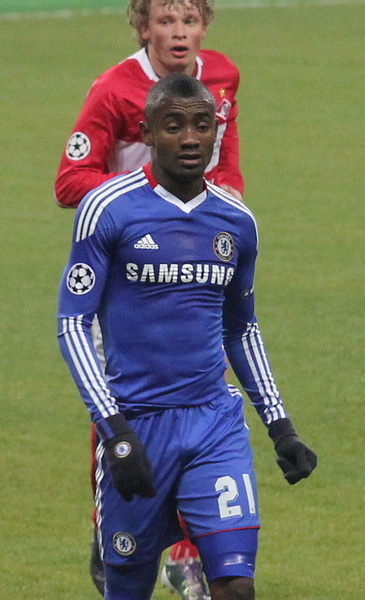
Kalou playing against Spartak Moscow in 2010.

Kalou started the season well with scoring the only goal in the 3–1 defeat at Wembley Stadium against Manchester United. He appeared as a substitute in the 6–0 drubbing of Wigan at the DW Stadium to score two goals, both assisted by fellow Ivorian Didier Drogba.

Through 31 appearances, Kalou had scored 14 goals in all competitions. Despite his form, however, he found it hard to gain a regular first team place since the addition of Fernando Torres from Liverpool in January. Nonetheless, he was included in the starting lineup for their next game against West Bromwich Albion, scoring a goal in Chelsea's 3–1 win on 16 April. Kalou started the next game as well, and scored again as Chelsea defeated Birmingham City 3–1. For Chelsea's crucial game against Tottenham Hotspur, Kalou was not included in the starting lineup, as Carlo Ancelotti preferred a striking partnership of Drogba and Torres. However, Kalou replaced Torres in the 63rd minute, scoring a goal in the 89th minute to lead Chelsea to a 2–1 win and within three points of league leaders Manchester United. This brought him up to ten Premier League goals on the year, the first time he has hit double digit league goals for Chelsea.

==== 2011–12 season ====
Kalou started the season with Chelsea playing in the club's second league game, against West Brom; he was substituted off, however, after only 34 minutes. He was an unused substitute against Sunderland and Bayer Leverkusen, but he started in Chelsea's first League Cup match of the season against Fulham. Chelsea won 4–3 on penalties, with him converting the second-last penalty. On 28 September 2011, Kalou came on for Frank Lampard in the 83rd minute. He then was booked for handball in the 85th minute which led to Roberto Soldado scoring a penalty; the score ended level at 1–1. Kalou's first goal of the new season came in a 5–0 rout of Belgian side Racing Genk on 19 October 2011. He scored in a 2–1 win at Goodison Park against Everton in the League Cup, then scored his first goal in the Premier League season in a 3–0 away win against Newcastle.

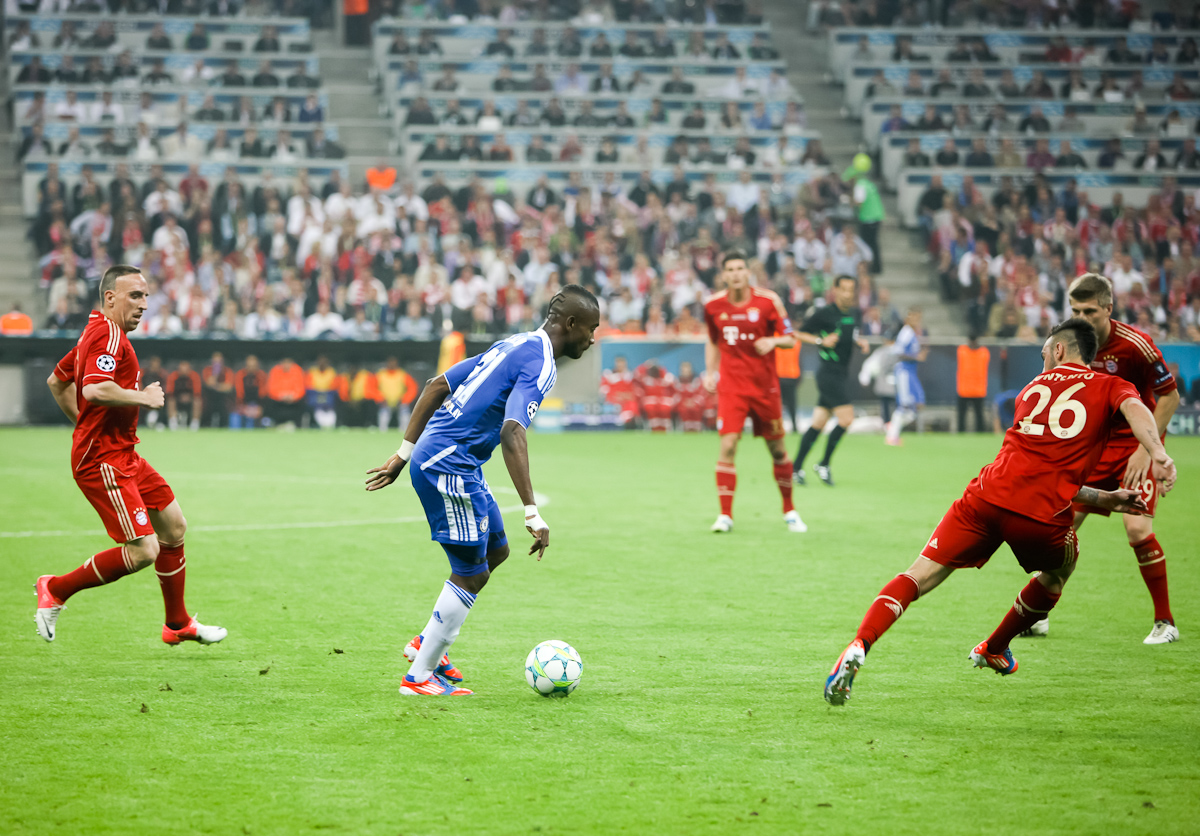
Kalou on the ball in the 2012 UEFA Champions League Final

Following the appointment of Roberto Di Matteo as interim manager, Kalou fought his way back into the first-team squad; under André Villas-Boas, he was frozen out, only making four starts in over seven months. Kalou scored his first goal in the season's edition of the FA Cup when Chelsea defeated Leicester City 5–2 at Stamford Bridge. This goal put him alongside Sergio Agüero as the only players to score in the Premier League, League Cup, FA Cup and Champions League in the season. Kalou then netted a vital away goal in the first leg of their Champions League quarter-final clash with Benfica after some great work from strike partner Fernando Torres. Chelsea won the game 1–0. Kalou's goal against Benfica was his 58th for the club. On 29 March 2012, he claimed he had been frozen out by former Chelsea manager André Villas-Boas. On 21 April, Kalou made his 250th appearance for Chelsea in a 0–0 draw away to rivals Arsenal. He started both the 2012 FA Cup Final and Champions League final, both of which were Chelsea victories.

On 1 July 2012, Chelsea officially announced that Kalou's contract had come to an end along with José Bosingwa, after spending six years at the London side. He had made 254 appearances for the club, including 147 starts, and scored 60 goals. After his release, Kalou was linked with numerous clubs across Europe, including the likes of Schalke 04, Liverpool, Galatasaray, Newcastle United and Arsenal.

=== Lille ===
On 7 July 2012, it was confirmed that Kalou would sign for Lille on a free transfer after being released by Chelsea at the end of his contract. He was given the number 8 jersey. New manager Rudi Garcia was pleased to see Kalou join Lille, but admitted that it was not easy to convince him to join the French side. Kalou scored his first competitive goal for Lille in his second appearance, a header to equalize the scoreline against Nancy. His first Champions League goal for the club came in their 6–1 defeat to Bayern Munich on 7 November.

In 2013–14, Kalou played all of Lille's games, starting all but two. He scored 16 goals, making him one of five runners-up to Zlatan Ibrahimović for top scorer. This included a hat-trick on 2 March with two penalties, as the Dogues won 3–2 at Ajaccio.

=== Hertha BSC ===
On 31 August 2014, Kalou joined Bundesliga side Hertha BSC on a three-year contract. The transfer fee paid to Lille was reported as €3 million.

In his first full season at the Berlin-based club, he played 27 times in the league, scoring six goals and helping Hertha avoid relegation.

At the beginning of the 2015–16 Bundesliga season, Kalou swapped number 11 for the vacant 8 shirt after the departure of Marcel Ndjeng to SC Paderborn. This was the same number he wore during his stint at Lille as well as with the Ivorian national side.

He started the season in good goal scoring form, scoring the winner from the penalty spot in an opening 1–0 win away to FC Augsburg. He scored his second of the season coming on as a substitute against an in-form Borussia Dortmund side in a 3–1 loss. On 3 October, Kalou scored his third goal of the season, the opener in a 3–0 win over Hamburger SV. He scored a brace on 27 October against 2. Bundesliga side FSV Frankfurt in the DFB-Pokal second round in a 2–1 win, scoring the winner from the spot in extra time. His goal-scoring form continued on 6 November when he recorded his first hat-trick for Hertha in a 3–1 win against Hannover 96. Kalou scored the final goal in a convincing 4–0 win over Darmstadt 98 on 12 December, lifting Hertha up to third in the Bundesliga. Kalou scored again the next weekend against Mainz 05, bringing his season tally to nine heading into the Christmas break, explaining that having "time to set up with the team" was important to his success in the first half while setting a goal of reaching the Champions League for his club. With his goal on 30 January 2016 at Werder Bremen, Kalou curiously became the first player to have double-digit goal-scoring seasons in the Premier League, Ligue 1, and the Bundesliga. Maintaining their third place until April, Hertha gained only one point from their final five matches, falling all the way to seventh place. Kalou scored 14 goals in the Bundesliga that year, finishing as Hertha's top scorer.

Kalou played in Hertha's brief Europa League stay against Brøndby IF, as well as their first round Pokal match against Jahn Regensburg, but did not feature in the Bundesliga initially for Pál Dárdai. An injury to Vladimír Darida vacated a spot initially for Valentin Stocker, but when Stocker picked up a three-match ban for a straight red card at Borussia Dortmund, it was Kalou who filled the hole in the attacking midfield, making his season debut on 22 October against FC Köln. On 4 November, Kalou emphatically ended his scoreless start to the season, picking up a hat trick against Borussia Mönchengladbach in a 3–0 victory, moving his side temporarily into third place. On 15 March 2017, Kalou signed a contract extension at Hertha, keeping him at the Olympiastadion until 2019, with Kalou adding "I'm really happy in Berlin and still have a lot to achieve with Hertha. I want to help build on the progress the team has made in recent years."

On 4 May 2020, he streamed live from the Hertha cabin via Facebook. Kalou greeted players and coaches, who were unaware of the live broadcast, with a handshake, disregarded social distancing regulations and filmed a conversation about the Hertha professionals' salary cuts. He was then released from training and playing duties.

=== Botafogo ===
On 9 July 2020, Kalou joined Botafogo in the Campeonato Brasileiro Série A on an 18-month contract. He made his debut on 2 September, starting in a goalless home draw against Coritiba. Three days later, he scored in a 2–2 draw at Corinthians. It was his only goal in 27 games across all competitions for the Rio de Janeiro team, who ended the season in last place, 14 points from safety. He left by mutual consent at the start of April 2021.

=== Arta/Solar7 ===
On 14 June 2022, Kalou joined Arta/Solar7 in the Djibouti Premier League on a short-term contract. On 3 April 2023, Kalou captained the team for the first time in a 1–1 draw with CF Gendarmerie due to the absence of Alex Song.

== International career ==
=== Failure to acquire Dutch citizenship ===
While at Feyenoord, Kalou sought fast-track naturalisation to become a Dutch citizen and play on the Netherlands national football team. His application was supported by national team manager Marco van Basten, and Dutch football icon Johan Cruyff. The process drew attention as the Dutch were scheduled to play the Ivory Coast at the 2006 FIFA World Cup, and he would likely play against his brother.

His application was rejected in August 2005 by Minister of Immigration Rita Verdonk, who believed that he would soon move to a bigger foreign club. In February 2006 the Council of State ordered that the decision be revised. Verdonk released the same verdict in May, saying that Kalou was ineligible for fast-track naturalisation and would have to go through the same tests as other applicants, thereby ruling Kalou out of the World Cup.

During the process, Dutch insurance company Centraal Beheer made a television advertisement in which Kalou represents the Netherlands' rivals Germany against them. He took legal action for use of his image and name in the film.

=== Ivory Coast ===
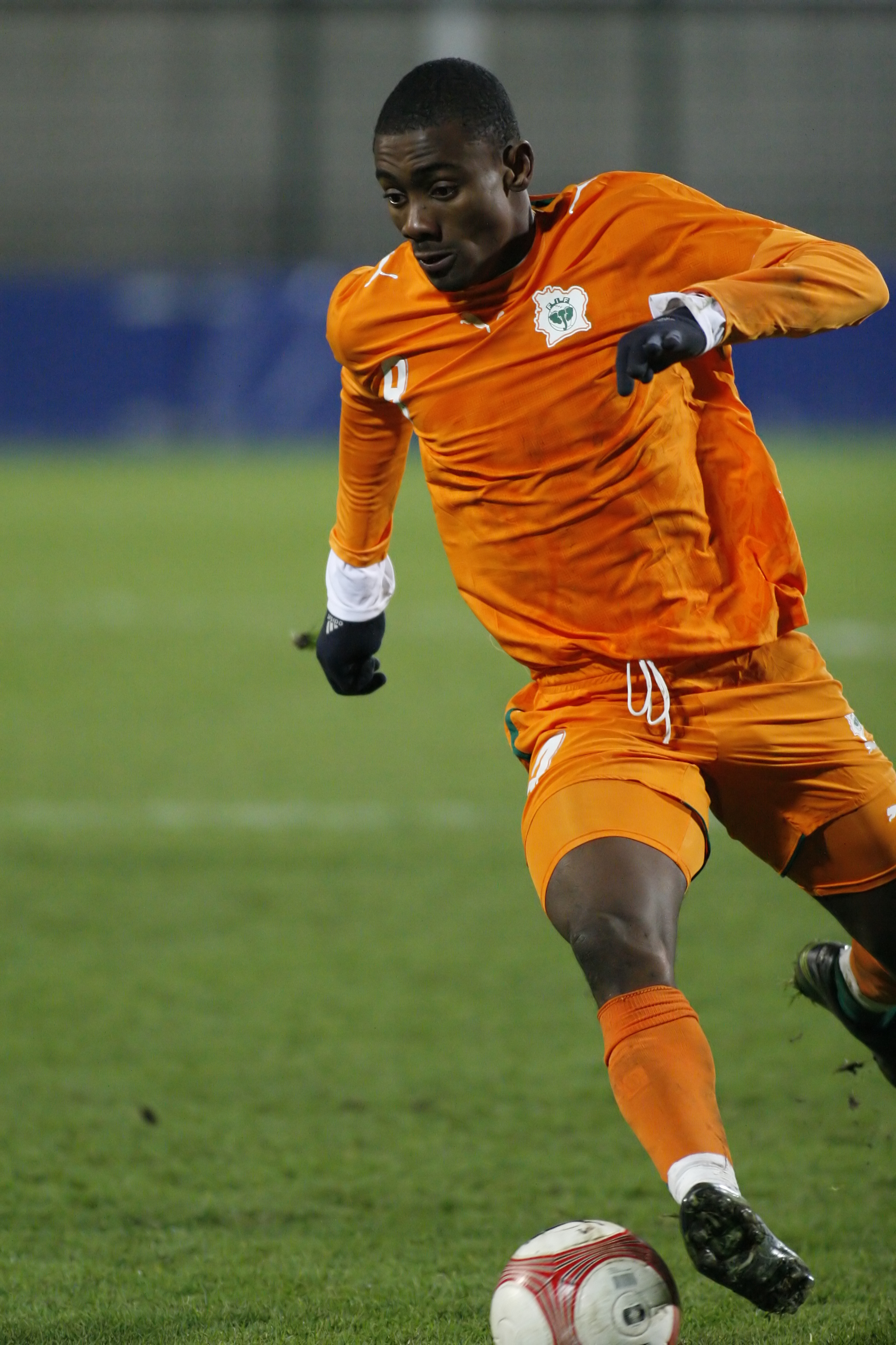
Kalou playing for the Ivory Coast in 2007

Kalou's failure to acquire Dutch citizenship was a factor in his decision to leave Feyenoord for Chelsea. He was called up for the Ivory Coast several times in 2006 but rejected them all. His debut game in a 1–0 friendly win over Guinea on 6 February 2007, and on 21 March he scored his first goal in a 3–0 friendly victory against Mauritius.

Kalou was called up for the 2008 Africa Cup of Nations in Ghana. He scored the only goal against Nigeria in the opening game, and added two more in a 5–0 win over Guinea in the quarter-finals as the Elephants came fourth.

At the 2010 Africa Cup of Nations in Angola, Kalou scored the opening goal of a 3–2 extra-time elimination by Algeria in the semi-finals. That June, he went to the 2010 FIFA World Cup in South Africa and scored as a substitute in a 3–0 win over North Korea in the final group game, though the Elephants were eliminated.

On 26 January 2012, Kalou scored a goal in Ivory Coast's 2–0 win over Burkina Faso, helping his side progress into the quarterfinals of the Africa Cup of Nations. In the final, he was substituted after 64 minutes of a penalty shootout loss to Zambia.

Kalou also played at the 2013 Africa Cup of Nations. Later that year, he scored in each leg of a 4–2 win over Senegal in the play-offs for the 2014 FIFA World Cup. In the 2015 Africa Cup of Nations, he came on as a substitute for Siaka Tiéné for the last four minutes of extra time in the final, and scored in a 9–8 shootout win over Ghana.

== Personal life ==
Kalou has two brothers and eight sisters. His brother, Bonaventure Kalou, also played professional football. Kalou joined Feyenoord during the time his brother Bonaventure was playing for the club.

In 2010, Kalou set up The Kalou Foundation, dedicated to providing facilities for social welfare and recreation of those who have need of such facilities by reason of youth, age, infirmity or disability, financial hardship or social circumstances and also for the relief of sickness worldwide.

== Career statistics ==
=== Club ===
As of 15 January 2023

Appearances and goals by club, season and competition
Club	Season	League			National cup (Note: Includes KNVB Cup, FA Cup, Coupe de France, DFB-Pokal, Copa do Brasil)		League cup (Note: Includes Football League Cup, Coupe de la Ligue)		Continental		Other		Total	
Club	Season	Division	Apps	Goals	Apps	Goals	Apps	Goals	Apps	Goals	Apps	Goals	Apps	Goals
Excelsior (loan)	2003–04	Eerste Divisie	11	4	0	0	—		—		6 (Note: Appearances in Eerste Divisie promotion play-offs)	0	17	4
Feyenoord	2003–04	Eredivisie	2	0	0	0	—		—		—		2	0
Feyenoord	2004–05	Eredivisie	31	20	0	0	—		7 (Note: Appearances in UEFA Cup)	4	—		38	24
Feyenoord	2005–06	Eredivisie	34	15	0	0	—		2	0	2 (Note: Appearances in Eredivisie UEFA Champions League play-offs)	0	38	15
Feyenoord	Total		67	35	0	0	—		9	4	2	0	78	39
Chelsea	2006–07	Premier League	33	7	7	1	6	1	11 (Note: Appearances in UEFA Champions League)	0	1 (Note: Appearance in FA Community Shield)	0	58	9
Chelsea	2007–08	Premier League	30	7	3	1	4	2	11	1	—		48	11
Chelsea	2008–09	Premier League	27	6	6	2	2	1	8	1	—		43	10
Chelsea	2009–10	Premier League	23	5	4	1	3	3	6	3	1	0	37	12
Chelsea	2010–11	Premier League	31	10	3	2	1	0	6	0	1	1	42	13
Chelsea	2011–12	Premier League	12	1	5	1	2	1	7	2	—		26	5
Chelsea	Total		156	36	28	8	18	8	49	7	3	1	254	60
Lille	2012–13	Ligue 1	28	14	1	1	1	0	7	1	—		37	16
Lille	2013–14	Ligue 1	38	16	2	2	0	0	—		—		40	18
Lille	2014–15	Ligue 1	1	0	0	0	0	0	2	0	—		3	0
Lille	Total		67	30	3	3	1	0	9	1	—		80	34
Hertha BSC	2014–15	Bundesliga	27	6	1	0	—		—		—		28	6
Hertha BSC	2015–16	Bundesliga	32	14	5	3	—		—		—		37	17
Hertha BSC	2016–17	Bundesliga	26	7	3	1	—		2 (Note: Appearances in UEFA Europa League)	0	—		31	8
Hertha BSC	2017–18	Bundesliga	31	12	2	0	—		3	0	—		36	12
Hertha BSC	2018–19	Bundesliga	30	8	3	0	—		—		—		33	8
Hertha BSC	2019–20	Bundesliga	5	1	2	1	—		—		—		7	2
Hertha BSC	Total		151	48	16	5	—		5	0	—		172	53
Botafogo	2020	Série A	25	1	2	0	—		—		—		27	1
Career total			477	155	49	16	19	8	72	12	11	1	628	191

=== International ===
As of match played 11 November 2017

Appearances and goals by national team and year
National team	Year	Apps	Goals
Ivory Coast	2007	7	3
Ivory Coast	2008	9	4
Ivory Coast	2009	7	1
Ivory Coast	2010	10	3
Ivory Coast	2011	5	1
Ivory Coast	2012	11	6
Ivory Coast	2013	11	3
Ivory Coast	2014	9	4
Ivory Coast	2015	11	2
Ivory Coast	2016	5	0
Ivory Coast	2017	8	0
Total		93	27

Scores and results list Ivory Coast's goal tally first.

List of international goals scored by Salomon Kalou
No.	Date	Venue	Opponent	Score	Result	Competition
1.	21 March 2007	Stade Anjalay, Belle Vue, Mauritius	Mauritius	1–0	3–0	Friendly
2.	3 June 2007	Stade Félix Houphouët-Boigny, Abidjan, Ivory Coast	Madagascar	1–0	5–0	2008 Africa Cup of Nations qualification
3.	21 November 2007	Jassim bin Hamad Stadium, Doha, Qatar	Qatar	5–0	6–1	Friendly
–	12 January 2008	Mohammed Al-Hamad Stadium, Hawally, Kuwait	Kuwait	2–0	2–0	Friendly (Note: This game isn't considered as FIFA valid by the website National-Football-Teams because Ivory Coast's number of substitutions exceeds six.)
4.	21 January 2008	Sekondi-Takoradi Stadium, Sekondi-Takoradi, Ghana	Nigeria	1–0	1–0	2008 Africa Cup of Nations
5.	3 February 2008	Sekondi-Takoradi Stadium, Sekondi-Takoradi, Ghana	Guinea	3–0	5–0	2008 Africa Cup of Nations
6.	3 February 2008	Sekondi-Takoradi Stadium, Sekondi-Takoradi, Ghana	Guinea	4–0	5–0	2008 Africa Cup of Nations
7.	11 October 2008	Stade Robert Champroux, Abidjan, Ivory Coast	Madagascar	3–0	3–0	2010 FIFA World Cup qualification
8.	29 March 2009	Stade Félix Houphouët-Boigny, Abidjan, Ivory Coast	Malawi	4–0	5–0	2010 FIFA World Cup qualification
9.	24 January 2010	Estádio Nacional do Chiazi, Cabinda, Angola	Algeria	1–0	2–3	2010 Africa Cup of Nations
10.	25 June 2010	Mbombela Stadium, Mbombela, South Africa	North Korea	3–0	3–0	2010 FIFA World Cup
11.	4 September 2010	Stade Félix Houphouët-Boigny, Abidjan, Ivory Coast	Rwanda	3–0	3–0	2012 Africa Cup of Nations qualification
12.	3 September 2011	Amahoro Stadium, Kigali, Rwanda	Rwanda	1–0	5–0	2012 Africa Cup of Nations qualification
13.	13 January 2012	Zayed Sports City Stadium, Abu Dhabi, United Arab Emirates	Tunisia	1–0	2–0	Friendly
14.	16 January 2012	Al Nahyan Stadium, Abu Dhabi, United Arab Emirates	Libya	1–0	1–0	Friendly
15.	26 January 2012	Estadio de Malabo, Malabo, Equatorial Guinea	Burkina Faso	1–0	2–0	2012 Africa Cup of Nations
16.	2 June 2012	Stade Félix Houphouët-Boigny, Abidjan, Ivory Coast	Tanzania	1–0	2–0	2014 FIFA World Cup qualification
17.	9 June 2012	Stade de Marrakech, Marrakesh, Morocco	Morocco	1–0	2–2	2014 FIFA World Cup qualification
18.	8 September 2012	Stade Félix Houphouët-Boigny, Abidjan, Ivory Coast	Senegal	1–1	4–2	2013 Africa Cup of Nations qualification
19.	23 March 2013	Stade Félix Houphouët-Boigny, Abidjan, Ivory Coast	Gambia	3–0	3–0	2014 FIFA World Cup qualification
20.	12 October 2013	Stade Félix Houphouët-Boigny, Abidjan, Ivory Coast	Senegal	3–0	3–1	2014 FIFA World Cup qualification
21.	16 November 2013	Stade Mohammed V, Casablanca, Morocco	Senegal	1–1	1–1	2014 FIFA World Cup qualification
22.	15 October 2014	Stade Félix Houphouët-Boigny, Abidjan, Ivory Coast	DR Congo	2–3	3–4	2015 Africa Cup of Nations qualification
23.	15 October 2014	Stade Félix Houphouët-Boigny, Abidjan, Ivory Coast	DR Congo	3–3	3–4	2015 Africa Cup of Nations qualification
24.	14 November 2014	Stade Félix Houphouët-Boigny, Abidjan, Ivory Coast	Sierra Leone	2–1	5–1	2015 Africa Cup of Nations qualification
25.	14 November 2014	Stade Félix Houphouët-Boigny, Abidjan, Ivory Coast	Sierra Leone	5–1	5–1	2015 Africa Cup of Nations qualification
26.	11 January 2015	Zayed Sports City Stadium, Abu Dhabi, United Arab Emirates	Nigeria	1–0	1–0	Friendly
27.	26 March 2015	Stade Félix Houphouët-Boigny, Abidjan, Ivory Coast	Angola	2–0	2–0	Friendly

== Honours ==
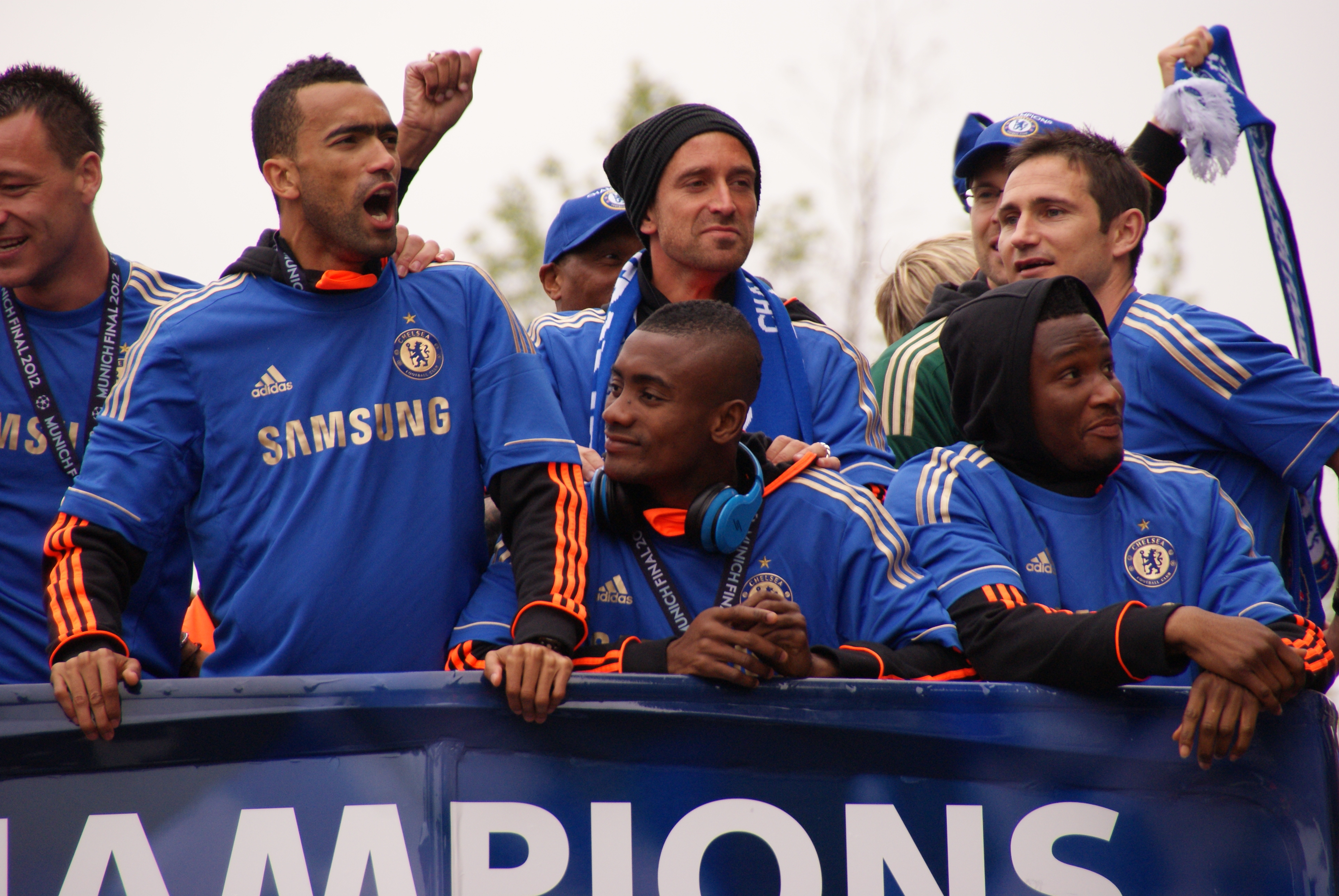
Kalou (front centre) on Chelsea's victory parade after winning the Champions League in 2012

Chelsea

- Premier League: 2009–10
- FA Cup: 2006–07, 2008–09, 2009–10, 2011–12
- Football League Cup: 2006–07; runner-up: 2007–08
- FA Community Shield: 2009
- UEFA Champions League: 2011–12

Ivory Coast

- Africa Cup of Nations: 2015

Individual

- Johan Cruyff Trophy: 2005
- CAF Young Player of the Year: 2008
