= Diégonéfla =

- Town, sub-prefecture, and commune
- Location in Ivory Coast
- Coordinates: 6°17′N 5°35′W
- Country: Ivory Coast
- District: Gôh-Djiboua
- Region: Gôh
- Department: Oumé

Area
  - Total: 441 km^{2} (170 sq mi)

Population (2021 census)
  - Total: 74,076
  - Density: 168/km^{2} (435/sq mi)
  - Town: 33,523
- (2014 census)
- Time zone: UTC+0 (GMT)

Diégonéfla is a town in south-central Ivory Coast. It is a sub-prefecture and commune of Oumé Department in Gôh Region, Gôh-Djiboua District.

In 2021, the population of the sub-prefecture of Diégonéfla was 74,076.

== Villages ==
The 14 villages of the sub-prefecture of Diégonéfla and their population in 2014 are :

1. Diégonéfla (33 523)
2. Gnandi-Boménéda (1 976)
3. Goudi-Boboda (5 918)
4. Scierie Jacob (10 564)
5. Sodefor Cité (1 106)
6. Tiama (1 054)
7. Badié (1 003)
8. Bidié (3 776)
9. Bronda (1 840)
10. Dédi (738)
11. Gouéda (3 947)
12. Lahouda (5 454)
13. Niéboda (1 002)
14. Tiégba (3 266)
