= Fromager =

Coordinates: 6°15′N 5°55′W

Fromager Region Région du Fromager
- Defunct region of Ivory Coast
- 2000–2011
- Location of Fromager Region in Ivory Coast
- Capital: Gagnoa
- Area
- 6,903 km^{2} (2,665 sq mi)
- History
  - Established as a first-level subdivision via division of Marahoué and Haut-Sassandra Regions: 2000
  - Disestablished: 2011
- Today part of: Gôh Region

Fromager Region is a defunct region of Ivory Coast. From 2000 to 2011, it was a first-level subdivision region. The region's capital was Gagnoa and its area was 6,903 km^{2}. Since 2011, the area formerly encompassed by the region is the second-level Gôh Region in Gôh-Djiboua District.

== Creation ==
Fromager Region was created in 2000 by combining Gagnoa Department from Haut-Sassandra Region and Oumé Department from Marahoué Region.

== Administrative divisions ==
For its entire existence, Fromager was divided into two departments: Gagnoa and Oumé.

== Abolition ==
Fromager Region was abolished as part of the 2011 administrative reorganisation of the subdivisions of Ivory Coast. The area formerly encompassed by the region is now Gôh Region. Gôh is one of two regions in the first-level Gôh-Djiboua District.
