= Gagnoa Airport =

Airport in Ivory Coast

- IATA: GGN; ICAO: DIGA

Summary
- Airport type: Public
- Serves: Gagnoa
- Elevation AMSL: 732 ft / 223 m
- Coordinates: 6°06′12″N 5°59′13″W

Map

Runways
Direction	Length		Surface
Direction	ft	m	Surface
16/34	3,937	1,200	Unpaved
- Source: Google Maps

Gagnoa Airport (IATA: GGN, ICAO: DIGA) is an airport serving Gagnoa, Côte d'Ivoire.

== See also ==
- Transport in Côte d'Ivoire
