= 2011 African U-20 Championship qualification =

This page details the process of the 2011 African Youth Championship qualification phase. The qualifiers consisted of three rounds of two-legged matches. Some countries had to say bye to the First Round. The winners of the Second Round matches qualified for the finals. South Africa entered the qualifiers as they were originally not the hosts.

== Preliminary round ==
The first leg was played on either 16, 17 or 18 April 2010. The second leg was held on either 30 April, 1 or 2 May 2010. The winners advanced to the First Round.

Ghana, Cameroon, South Africa, Nigeria, Egypt, Rwanda, Mali, Ivory Coast, Benin, Gambia, Sudan, Zambia, Congo, Burkina Faso, Angola and Morocco all received byes to the First Round.

Team 1	Agg.	Team 2	1st leg	2nd leg
Central African Republic	7–1	(Democratic Republic of the Congo) Congo DR	3–0	4–1
Togo	2–2(a)	Guinea	2–1	0–1
Mauritius	walkover	Comoros	W/O	W/O
Uganda	walkover	Ethiopia	W/O	W/O
Senegal	1–0	Tunisia	0–0	1–0
Lesotho	7–2	Mozambique	6–1	1–1
Eritrea	walkover	Kenya	W/O	W/O
Malawi	3–5	Tanzania	2–2	1–3
Sierra Leone	2–1	Algeria	2–0	0–1
Namibia	walkover	Zimbabwe	W/O	W/O
Equatorial Guinea	1–4	Gabon	0–3	1–1
Chad	7–4	Burundi	5–0	2–4

== First round ==
The First Round first leg matches were held on 23, 24 and 25 July 2010. The second leg matches were held on 6, 7 and 8 August 2010. The winners qualified for the Second Round.

Team 1	Agg.	Team 2	1st leg	2nd leg
Cameroon	5–1	Central African Republic	4–0	1–1
Congo (Republic of the Congo)	3–2	Rwanda	2–0	1–2
Nigeria	2–1	Guinea	2–0	0–1
Zambia	2–3	Mauritius	1–0	1–3
Egypt	2–1	Uganda	2–0	0–1
Morocco	0–2	Senegal	0–2	0–0
South Africa	2–3	Lesotho	0–2	2–1
Sudan	0–3	Kenya	0–2	0–1
Ivory Coast	2–1	Tanzania	1–0	1–1
Gambia (The Gambia)	4–1	Sierra Leone	4–1	0–0
Ghana	5–1	Namibia	4–0	1–1
Benin	4–2	Burkina Faso	0–0	4–2
Angola	2–3	Gabon	2–0	0–3
Mali	4–0	Chad	2–0	2–0

== Second round ==
The Second Round first leg matches were played on 24 to 26 September 2010. The second leg matches were played on 22 to 24 October 2010. The winners of the aggregate of the two legs qualified for the Finals.

Team 1	Agg.	Team 2	1st leg	2nd leg
Senegal	1–3	Egypt	1–0	0–3
Benin	1–6	Ghana	0–2	1–4
Gambia (The Gambia)	2–0	Ivory Coast	1–0	1–0
Mauritius	1–4	Nigeria	0–2	1–2
Cameroon	3–0	(Republic of the Congo) Congo	1–0	2–0
Kenya	0–1	Lesotho	0–1	0–0
Mali	3–2	Gabon	3–1	0–1
