= Oumé =

- Town, sub-prefecture, and commune
- Location in Ivory Coast
- Coordinates: 6°23′N 5°25′W
- Country: Ivory Coast
- District: Gôh-Djiboua
- Region: Gôh
- Department: Oumé

Area
  - Total: 1,290 km^{2} (500 sq mi)

Population (2021 census)
  - Total: 127,153
  - Density: 98.6/km^{2} (255/sq mi)
  - Town: 45,210
- (2014 census)
- Time zone: UTC+0 (GMT)

Oumé is a town in south-central Ivory Coast. It is a sub-prefecture of and the seat of Oumé Department in Gôh Region, Gôh-Djiboua District. Oumé is also a commune.

== Notable people ==
- Salomon Kalou (born 5 August 1985), footballer, who notably played for Chelsea (2006–2012) and the Ivory Coast national football team (2007–2017).
- Bonaventure Kalou (born 12 January 1978), footballer who notably played for Paris Saint-Germain (2005–2007) and the Ivory Coast national football team (1998–2006). He is the older brother of Solomon.
