= Gagnoa =

- City, sub-prefecture, and commune
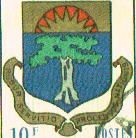
- Coat of arms

- Location in Ivory Coast
- Coordinates: 6°8′N 5°56′W
- Country: Ivory Coast
- District: Gôh-Djiboua District
- Region: Gôh
- Department: Gagnoa

Area
  - Total: 890 km^{2} (340 sq mi)

Population (2021 census)
  - Total: 277,044
  - Density: 310/km^{2} (810/sq mi)
  - City: 160,465
- (2014 census)
- Time zone: UTC+0 (GMT)

Gagnoa is a city in south-central Ivory Coast. It is the seat of both Gôh-Djiboua District and Gôh Region. It is also the seat of and a sub-prefecture of Gagnoa Department. Gagnoa is also a commune. In the 2014 census, the city had a population of 160,465, making it the seventh-largest city in the country.

Gagnoa is the seat of the Roman Catholic Archdiocese of Gagnoa, and contains its cathedral.

== Villages ==
The 37 villages of the sub-prefecture of Gagnoa and their population in 2014 are:

1. Ahizabré (5,014)
2. Atonihio (510)
3. Bobia (1,177)
4. Bognoa (1,338)
5. Bogrégnoa (1,274)
6. Dagodio (528)
7. Dahopa-Ourepa (1,579)
8. Daliguépa (206)
9. Digbeugnoa (1,199)
10. Dobé (1,217)
11. Gagnoa (160,465)
12. Gnahio-Dégoué (621)
13. Godiabré (674)
14. Grébré (989)
15. Guéménédou (2,930)
16. Guessihio (3,620)
17. Kabia (503)
18. Kakrédou (1,260)
19. Kripahio (1,476)
20. Lélébrékoua (1,276)
21. Logobia (3,022)
22. Maguiahio (2,453)
23. Mahidio (717)
24. Mahinadopa (1,362)
25. Ménékré (1,213)
26. Moko (712)
27. Obodroupa (2,065)
28. Ony-Babré (747)
29. Ony-Tabré (797)
30. Payopa (2,546)
31. Sogrobognoa (1,071)
32. Tchédjélet (1,583)
33. Tiétiékou (1,214)
34. Tipadipa (2,108)
35. Todiognoa (296)
36. Toutoubré (2,957)
37. Zigopa(1,199)

== Climate ==
Gagnoa has a tropical savanna climate (Köppen Aw) with a lengthy although not particularly intense wet season from February/March to November, and a short dry season centred upon December and January.

Climate data for Gagnoa
Month	Jan	Feb	Mar	Apr	May	Jun	Jul	Aug	Sep	Oct	Nov	Dec	Year
Mean daily maximum °C (°F)	32.3 (90.1)	33.6 (92.5)	33.0 (91.4)	32.5 (90.5)	31.6 (88.9)	29.8 (85.6)	28.6 (83.5)	28.6 (83.5)	29.8 (85.6)	30.9 (87.6)	31.1 (88.0)	30.7 (87.3)	31.0 (87.8)
Daily mean °C (°F)	26.1 (79.0)	26.8 (80.2)	27.5 (81.5)	27.3 (81.1)	26.8 (80.2)	25.7 (78.3)	24.9 (76.8)	24.7 (76.5)	25.5 (77.9)	26.2 (79.2)	26.5 (79.7)	25.7 (78.3)	26.1 (79.0)
Mean daily minimum °C (°F)	20.1 (68.2)	21.8 (71.2)	22.2 (72.0)	22.3 (72.1)	22.3 (72.1)	21.9 (71.4)	21.4 (70.5)	21.4 (70.5)	21.7 (71.1)	22.0 (71.6)	22.0 (71.6)	20.9 (69.6)	21.7 (71.1)
Average rainfall mm (inches)	23.5 (0.93)	63.4 (2.50)	123.1 (4.85)	162.8 (6.41)	177.5 (6.99)	205.8 (8.10)	89.4 (3.52)	95.4 (3.76)	172.0 (6.77)	159.2 (6.27)	96.4 (3.80)	37.5 (1.48)	1,406 (55.38)
Mean monthly sunshine hours	195.7	184.5	189.0	204.9	210.4	122.0	120.8	97.5	127.1	176.4	180.2	166.0	1,974.5
Source: NOAA

== Notable people ==
French rapper Vegedream's father as well as fellow performer and uncle Ziké are from Gagnoa, and Vegedream, famously the artist in the song Ramenez la coupe à la maison, says the French phrase Et ça c'est Vegedream de Gagnoa, meaning "And that is Vegedream of Gagnoa", in each song. He got that phrase when he visited Gagnoa as a child. He is therefore also named Vegedream de Gagnoa.
