= Oumé Department =

Coordinates: 6°23′N 5°25′W

Oumé Department Département d'Oumé
- Department
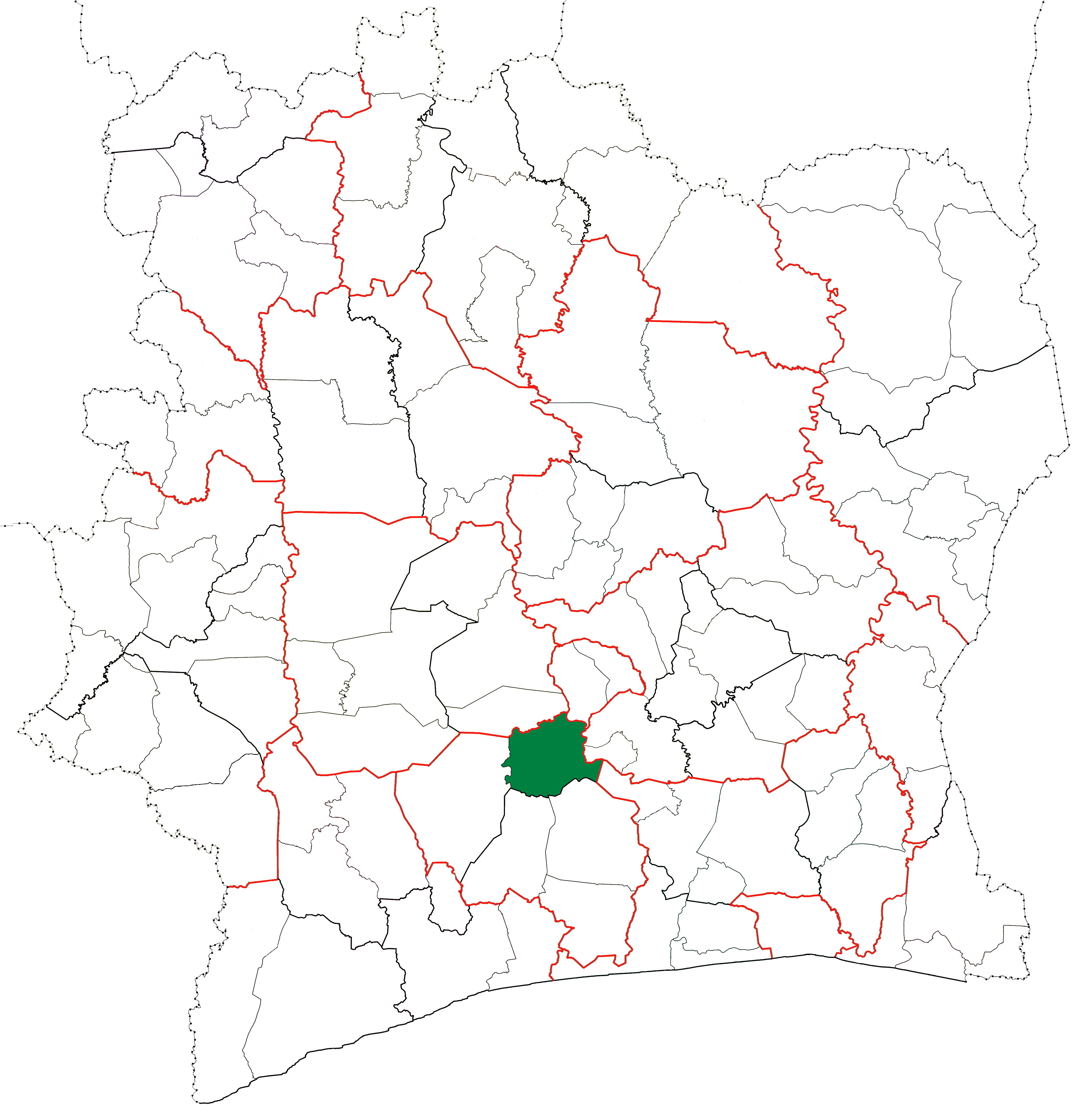
- Location in Ivory Coast. Oumé Department has retained the same boundaries since its creation in 1980.
- Country: Ivory Coast
- District: Gôh-Djiboua
- Region: Gôh
- 1980: Established as a first-level subdivision via a division of Gagnoa Dept
- 1997: Converted to a second-level subdivision
- 2000: Transferred to the new Fromager Region
- 2011: Converted to a third-level subdivision
- Departmental seat: Oumé

Government
  - Prefect: François Dogbo Labé

Area
  - Total: 2,220 km^{2} (860 sq mi)

Population (2021 census)
  - Total: 260,786
  - Density: 117/km^{2} (304/sq mi)
- Time zone: UTC+0 (GMT)

Oumé Department is a department of Gôh Region in Gôh-Djiboua District, Ivory Coast. In 2021, its population was 260,786 and its seat is the settlement of Oumé. The sub-prefectures of the department are Diégonéfla, Guépahouo, Oumé, and Tonla.

== History ==
Oumé Department was created in 1980 as a split-off from Gagnoa Department.

In 1997, regions were introduced as new first-level subdivisions of Ivory Coast; as a result, all departments were converted into second-level subdivisions. Oumé Department was initially included in Marahoué Region, but in 2000 Oumé Department was combined with Haut-Sassandra's Gagnoa Department to create Fromager Region.

In 2011, districts were introduced as new first-level subdivisions of Ivory Coast. At the same time, regions were reorganised and became second-level subdivisions and all departments were converted into third-level subdivisions. At this time, Oumé Department became part of Gôh Region in Gôh-Djiboua District.
