= Gagnoa Department =

Coordinates: 6°8′N 5°56′W

Gagnoa Department Département de Gagnoa
- Department
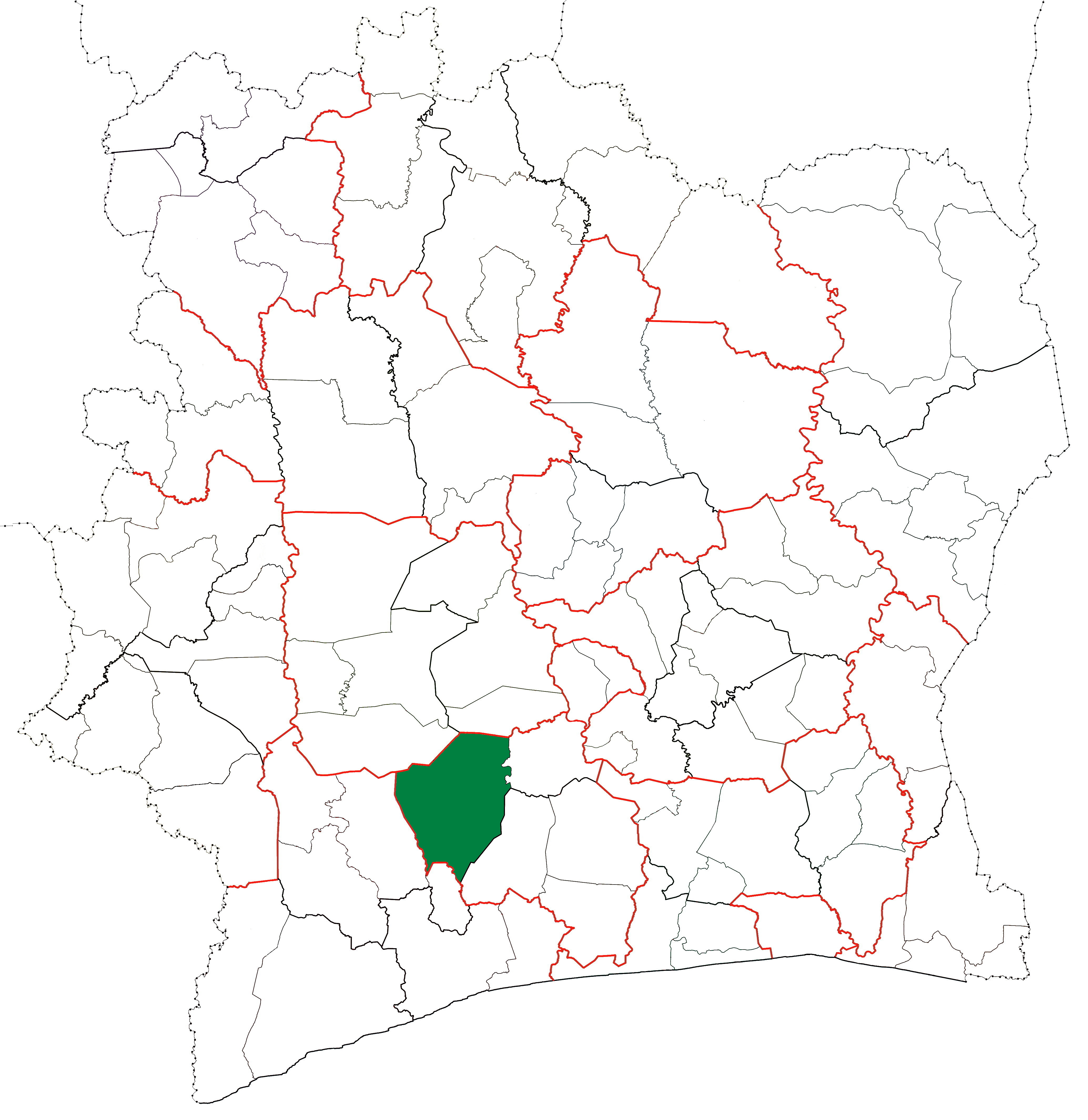
- Location in Ivory Coast. Gagnoa Department has had these boundaries since 1980.
- Country: Ivory Coast
- District: Gôh-Djiboua
- Region: Gôh
- 1969: Established as a first-level subdivision
- 1980: Divided to create Oumé Dept
- 1997: Converted to a second-level subdivision
- 2000: Transferred to the new Fromager Region
- 2011: Converted to a third-level subdivision
- Departmental seat: Gagnoa

Government
  - Prefect: Rémi N'Zi Kanga

Area
  - Total: 4,680 km^{2} (1,810 sq mi)

Population (2021 census)
  - Total: 724,496
  - Density: 155/km^{2} (401/sq mi)
- Time zone: UTC+0 (GMT)

Gagnoa Department is a department of Gôh Region in Gôh-Djiboua District, Ivory Coast. In 2021, its population was 724,496 and its seat is the settlement of Gagnoa. The sub-prefectures of the department are Bayota, Dahiépa-Kéhi, Dignago, Dougroupalégnaoa, Doukouyo, Gagnoa, Galebre-Galébouo, Gnagbodougnoa, Guibéroua, Ouragahio, Sérihio, and Yopohué.

== History ==
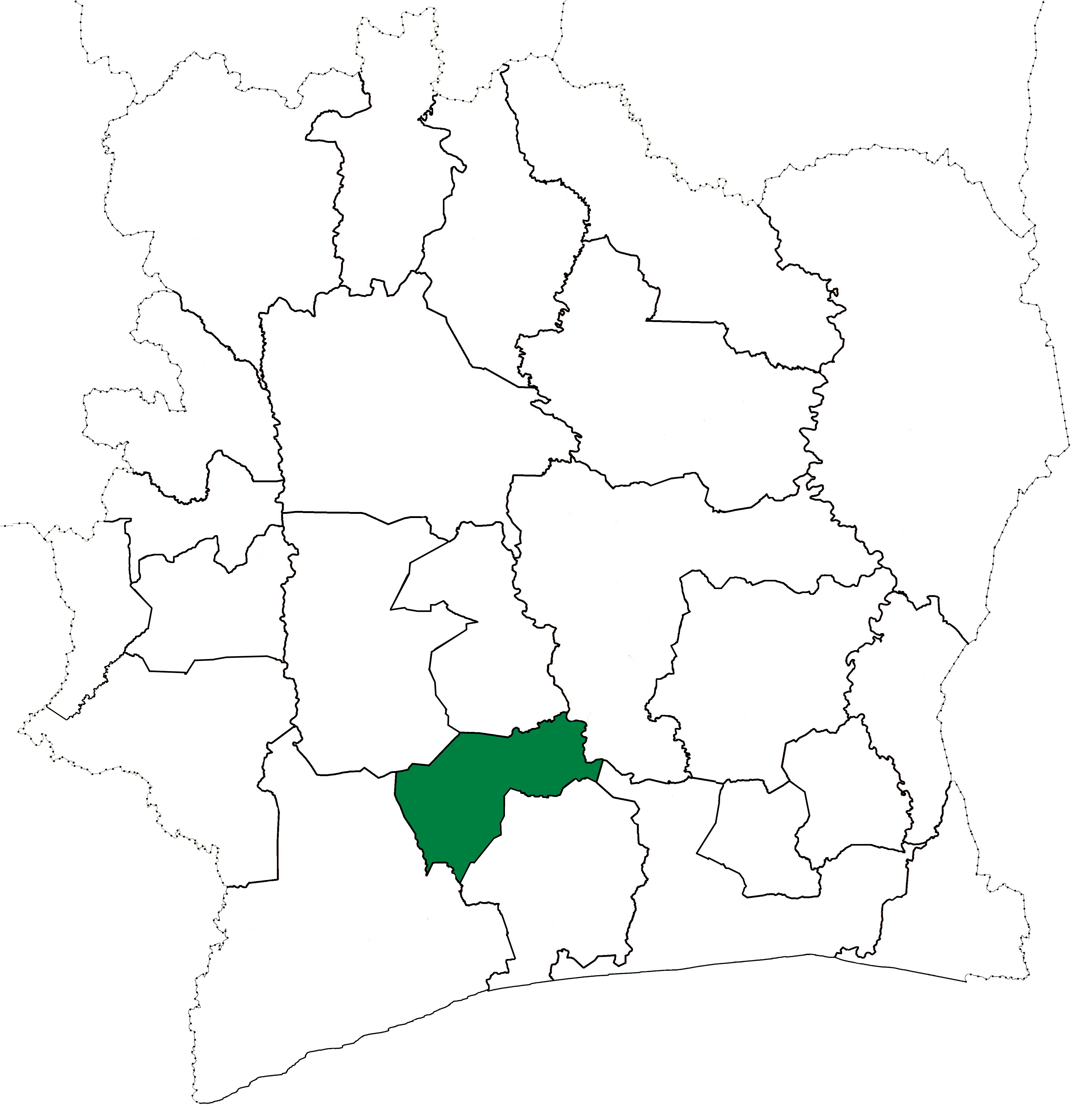
Gagnoa Department upon its creation in 1969. It kept these boundaries until 1980, but other departments began to be divided in 1974.

Gagnoa Department was created in 1969 as one of the 24 new departments that were created to take the place of the six departments that were being abolished. It was created from territory that was formerly part of Centre-Ouest Department. Using current boundaries as a reference, from 1969 to 1980 the department occupied the same territory as Gôh Region.

In 1980, Gagnoa Department was divided to create Oumé Department. In 1997, regions were introduced as new first-level subdivisions of Ivory Coast; as a result, all departments were converted into second-level subdivisions. Gagnoa Department was initially included in Haut-Sassandra Region, but in 2000 it was combined with Oumé Department to form the new Fromager Region.

In October 2005, Gagnoa Department was the base of Bangladeshi UNOCI troops aiming to secure the proposed presidential elections in the country.

In 2011, districts were introduced as new first-level subdivisions of Ivory Coast. At the same time, regions were reorganised and became second-level subdivisions and all departments were converted into third-level subdivisions. At this time, Gagnoa Department became part of Gôh Region in Gôh-Djiboua District.

== Demographics ==
The population of the department is predominantly from the Bété and Gagu ethnic groups.

== Transport ==
The department is served by Gagnoa Airport.
