= Gôh-Djiboua District =

District of Ivory Coast

Coordinates: 6°8′N 5°56′W

Gôh-Djiboua District District du Gôh-Djiboua
- District
- Country: Ivory Coast
- Established: 2011
- Capital: Gagnoa

Area
  - Total: 15,700 km^{2} (6,100 sq mi)

Population (2021)
  - Total: 2,088,440
  - Density: 133/km^{2} (345/sq mi)
- ISO 3166 code: CI-GD
- HDI (2022): 0.551 medium · 6th of 14

Gôh-Djiboua District (French: District du Gôh-Djiboua) is one of fourteen administrative districts of Ivory Coast. The district is located in the southwest corner of the country. The capital of the district is Gagnoa.

== Creation ==
Gôh-Djiboua District was created in a 2011 administrative reorganisation of the subdivisions of Ivory Coast. The territory of the district was composed by merging the former regions of Sud-Bandama (except the department of Fresco) and Fromager.

== Administrative divisions ==
Gôh-Djiboua District is currently subdivided into two regions and the following departments:

- Gôh Region (formerly Fromager Region) (region seat also in Gagnoa)
  - Gagnoa Department
  - Oumé Department
- Lôh-Djiboua Region (formerly Sud-Bandama Region) (region seat in Divo)
  - Divo Department
  - Lakota Department
  - Guitry Department

== Population ==
According to the 2021 census, Gôh-Djiboua District has a population of 2,088,440.

=== Religion ===
Religion in Gôh-Djiboua (2021 census)
Religion	Percent
Christianity	45.1%
Islam	43.9%
None	7.6%
Traditional	0.8%
Other	2.6%

Gôh-Djiboua has a religiously diverse population. According to the 2021 census, Christianity is the plurality religion in the district (45.1%), followed closely by Islam (43.9%) and those with no religion (7.6%). A smaller share of residents adhere to traditional religions or other faiths.
