= Gôh =

Coordinates: 6°8′N 5°56′W

Gôh Region Région du Gôh
- Region
- Location of Gôh Region in Ivory Coast
- Country: Ivory Coast
- District: Gôh-Djiboua
- Established: 2011
- Regional seat: Gagnoa

Government
  - Prefect: Rémi N'Zi Kanga
  - Council President: Joachim Djédjé Bagnon

Area
  - Total: 6,890 km^{2} (2,660 sq mi)

Population (2021 census)
  - Total: 985,282
  - Density: 143/km^{2} (370/sq mi)
- Time zone: UTC+0 (GMT)

Gôh Region is one of the 31 regions of Ivory Coast. Since its establishment in 2011, it has been one of two regions in Gôh-Djiboua District. The region's seat is Gagnoa and its area is 7327 km². At the 2021 census, the region had a population of 985,282.

== History ==
From 2000 until the 2011 administrative reorganisation of the subdivisions of Ivory Coast, the territory that is now Gôh constituted the first-level division Fromager Region. At the reorganisation, the territory was renamed Gôh and combined with Lôh-Djiboua to form the new first-level division Gôh-Djiboua District.

== Departments ==
Gôh Region is currently divided into two departments: Gagnoa and Oumé.
