= Achi I government =

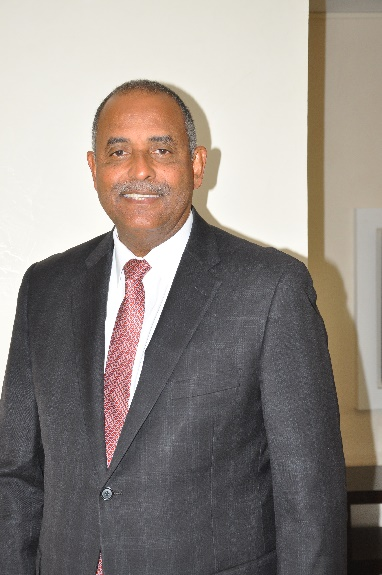

The Achi I government governed the Ivory Coast between 2021 and 2022. It was dissolved in 2022 and replaced with the Achi II government.

In March 2021, Patrick Achi, part of Ivorian President Alassane Ouattara's close circle, was appointed by the president as interim Prime Minister of the Ivory Coast, previously Chief of Staff, following the death of his predecessor Hamed Bakayoko from cancer.

== Ministers ==
- Patrick Achi
- Kandia Camara
- Téné Birahima Ouattara
- Kaba Nialé
- Amadou Koné

== See also ==
- Politics of Ivory Coast
