= Minister of Foreign Affairs (Ivory Coast) =

Minister of Foreign Affairs of the Ivory Coast
- National coat of arms

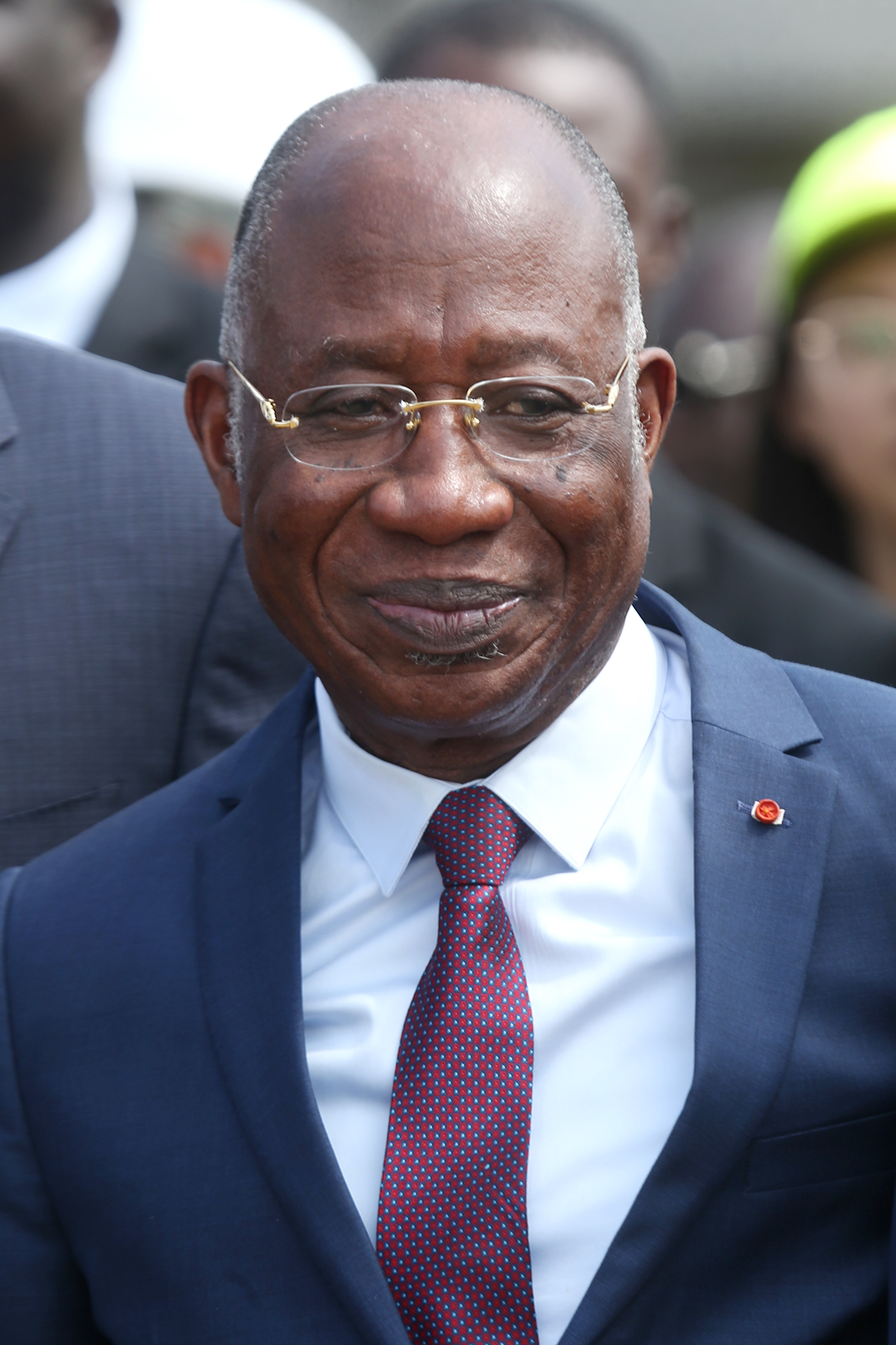
- Incumbent; Kacou Houadja Léon Adom since 18 October 2023
- Inaugural holder: Félix Houphouët-Boigny
- Formation: 3 November 1960

Minister of Foreign Affairs of the Republic of Ivory Coast is a government minister in charge of the Ministry of Foreign Affairs of Ivory Coast, responsible for conducting foreign relations of the country.

The following is a list of foreign ministers of Ivory Coast since its founding in 1960:

| No. | Name (Birth–Death) | Portrait | Tenure |
|---|---|---|---|
| 1 | Félix Houphouët-Boigny (1905–1993) | | 1960–1963 |
| 2 | Camille Alliali (b. 1926) | | 1963–1966 |
| 3 | Arsène Assouan Usher (1930–2007) | | 1966–1977 |
| 4 | Simeon Aké (1932–2003) | | 1977–1990 |
| 5 | Amara Essy (1944–2025) | | 1990–2000 |
| 6 | Christophe M'Boua (1942–2013) | | 2000 |
| 7 | Charles Gomis (1941–2021) | | 2000 |
| 8 | Aboudramane Sangaré (1946–2018) | | 2000–2003 |
| 9 | Bamba Mamadou (1952–2012) | | 2003–2006 |
| 10 | Youssouf Bakayoko (1943–2023) | | 2006–2010 |
| 11 | Jean-Marie Kacou Gervais (b. 1938) (Note: From 5 December 2010 under President Alassane Ouattara) | | 2010–2011 |
| 12 | Alcide Djédjé (b. 1956) (Note: Under President Laurent Gbagbo) | | 2010–2011 |
| 13 | Daniel Kablan Duncan (b. 1943) | | 2011–2012 |
| 14 | Charles Koffi Diby (1957–2019) | | 2012–2016 |
| 15 | Albert Toikeusse Mabri (b. 1962) | | 2016 |
| 16 | Marcel Amon-Tanoh (b. 1951) (Note: Acting to 2017) | | 2016–2020 |
| 17 | Ally Coulibaly (b. 1951) | | 2020–2021 |
| 18 | Kandia Camara (b. 1959) | | 2021–2023 |
| 19 | Kacou Houadja Léon Adom (b. 1950) | | 2023–2026 |
| 20 | Kaba Nialé (b. 1962) | | 2026–present |

== Sources ==
- Rulers.org – Foreign ministers A–D
