= Aimée Zebeyoux =

Ivorian politician and activist (born 1959)

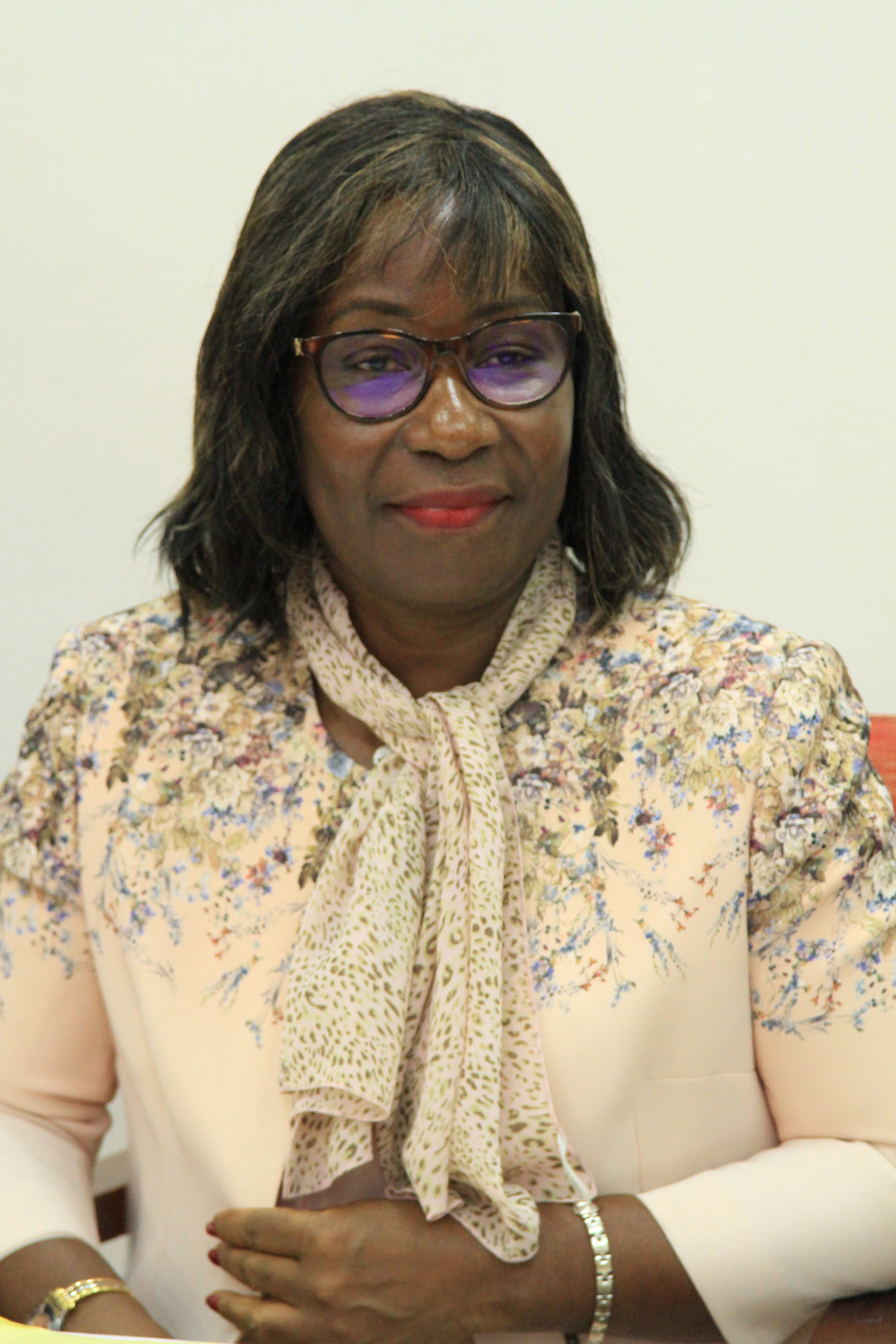
- Aimée Zébéyoux in 2018

Advisor to the Constitutional Council of the Republic of Côte d'Ivoire
- Incumbent
- Assumed office 6 June 2023

Minister of Justice and Human Rights
- In office 2018–2021

Personal details
- Born: 30 May 1959 (age 67) Abidjan, Ivory Coast
- Education: University of Abidjan

Aimée Gbakrehonon Zébéyoux (born 30 May 1959) is an Ivorian judge and human rights activist. She has been an advisor to the Constitutional Council of the Republic of Côte d'Ivoire since 2023. She was Secretary of State to the Keeper of the Seals, Minister of Justice and Human Rights. She is also a Senior Magistrate. She is the youngest of eight children. Her academic background is traditional, based on law and accounting. She obtained a Baccalaureate (Bac B) from the Technical High School of Abidjan, then a master's degree in law, which she continued at the University of Abidjan. She then entered the National School of Administration (ENA), Judicial Section.

== Biography ==
Originally from Gagnoa, Aimée Zébéyoux was born 30 May 1959 in Abidjan, in southern Ivory Coast. The second of eight children and mother of one daughter, Aimée followed a standard school and university path, focusing on law and accounting. In 1980, she obtained her baccalaureate from the Abidjan Technical High School. Five years later, in 1985, she earned a master's degree in law from the Université Félix Houphouët-Boigny, specializing in judicial careers. Subsequently, she was admitted to the advanced program at the National School of Administration in Abidjan, in the judiciary section. In 1988, she graduated with a degree in the judiciary. Upon graduation, she was appointed a deputy public prosecutor at the Plateau Court of First Instance.

== Career ==
=== Lawyer ===
After the National School of Administration, Aimée Zébéyoux was appointed, in 1988, deputy public prosecutor at the Plateau Court of First Instance. She held this position until 1991. She then climbed several rungs, occupying various positions in the Ivorian legal system.

For two years, from 1991 to 1993, she was a children's judge. From 1993, she became a judge in charge of civil and commercial affairs at the court of first instance of the Plateau commune and a supervising judge responsible for liquidations and judicial reorganizations as well as company liquidation.

From 1996 to 2001, she was an advisor to the Court of Appeal, President of the Civil, Commercial and Administrative Chamber, President of the Correctional Chamber and President of the Indictment Chamber.

In 2011, Aimée Zébéyoux was promoted to the rank of senior magistrate. Then, from October 2011 to July 2018, she served as Advocate General at the Supreme Court of Côte d'Ivoire. Also in 2011, following the 2010–2011 Ivorian crisis, a post-election crisis in Côte d'Ivoire, she was appointed legal expert to the Dialogue, Truth and Reconciliation Commission (CDVR), headed by Prime Minister Charles Konan Banny. Furthermore, she participated in several election observation missions in Africa on behalf of the African Union and ECOWAS.

=== Government ===
On 10 July 2018, Aimée Zébéyoux joined the government of Amadou Gon Coulibaly as Secretary of State to the Keeper of the Seals, Minister of Justice and Human Rights, with responsibility for human rights. She was retained in her position in the government of Patrick Achi of September 2019, a function which she retained until 2021 before being appointed special advisor to the president on human rights issues.

=== Constitutional Council ===
On 6 June 2023, she was appointed for a six-year term to the Ivorian Constitutional Council by Alassane Ouattara as an advisor.

== Human rights activist ==
Aimée Zébéyoux is also an activist committed to fighting against legal inequalities and discrimination. She works to promote equality, equity, social justice and democratic representation, while upholding fundamental human rights.

Because of her commitment to human rights, she joined the Association of Women Jurists of Côte d'Ivoire (AFJCI) in 2001 and was elected head of the organization on 31 July 2013.

== Legacy ==
Since May 2024, a public primary school in Gagnoa bears her name. The Gagnoa municipal council decided that this primary school would bear her name so that "it would serve as a model for current and future generations".

== Distinctions ==
- 2016: Officer of the Ivorian National Order of Merit for Solidarity.
- 2019: Officer in the Ivorian National Order of Merit.
- 2020: Commander in the Order of Merit of the Civil Service of the Republic of Côte d'Ivoire.
