= Achi II government =

The Achi II government governed the Ivory Coast from 20 April 2022 to 6 October 2023.

In April 2022, Patrick Achi along with his cabinet tabled their resignations as Ivorian President Alassane Ouattara openly announced plans for slimming down the size of the cabinet from 41 ministers to 30 ministers, claiming a smaller cabinet would be more efficient. He was later reappointed PM again by the president just a week after resigning from his post.

A year later in October 2023, President Ouattara dissolved the government, including Prime Minister Patrick Achi and all ministers, expressing gratitude for their service. On October 17, 2023, a new Prime Minister was appointed: Robert Beugré Mambé

== Ministers ==
- Patrick Achi, Prime Minister of Ivory Coast
- Kandia Camara. Minister of Foreign Affairs
- Téné Birahima Ouattara, Minister of Defence
- Kobenan Kouassi Adjoumani, Minister of Agriculture and Rural Development
- Vagondo Diomandé, Minister of Interior
- Kaba Nialé, Minister of Economy and Finance
- Mamadou Sangafowa Coulibaly
- Anne Désirée Ouloto, Minister of Public Service
- Amadou Koné, Minister of Transport

== See also ==
- Politics of Ivory Coast
