= Ivory Coast–Mexico relations =

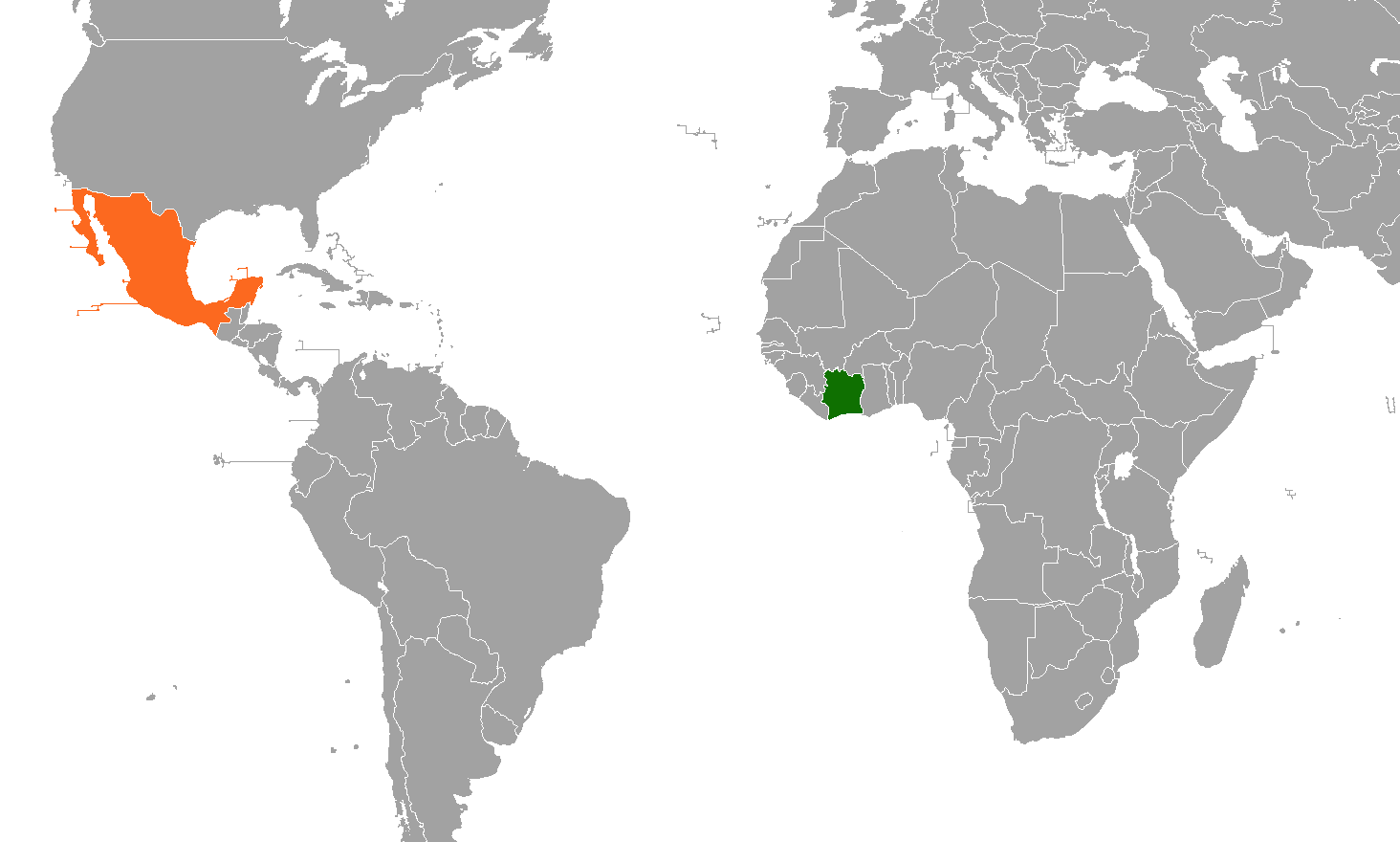

- Ivory Coast: Mexico

The nations of the Ivory Coast (Côte d'Ivoire) and Mexico established diplomatic relations in 1975. Both nations are members of the Group of 24 and the United Nations.

== History ==
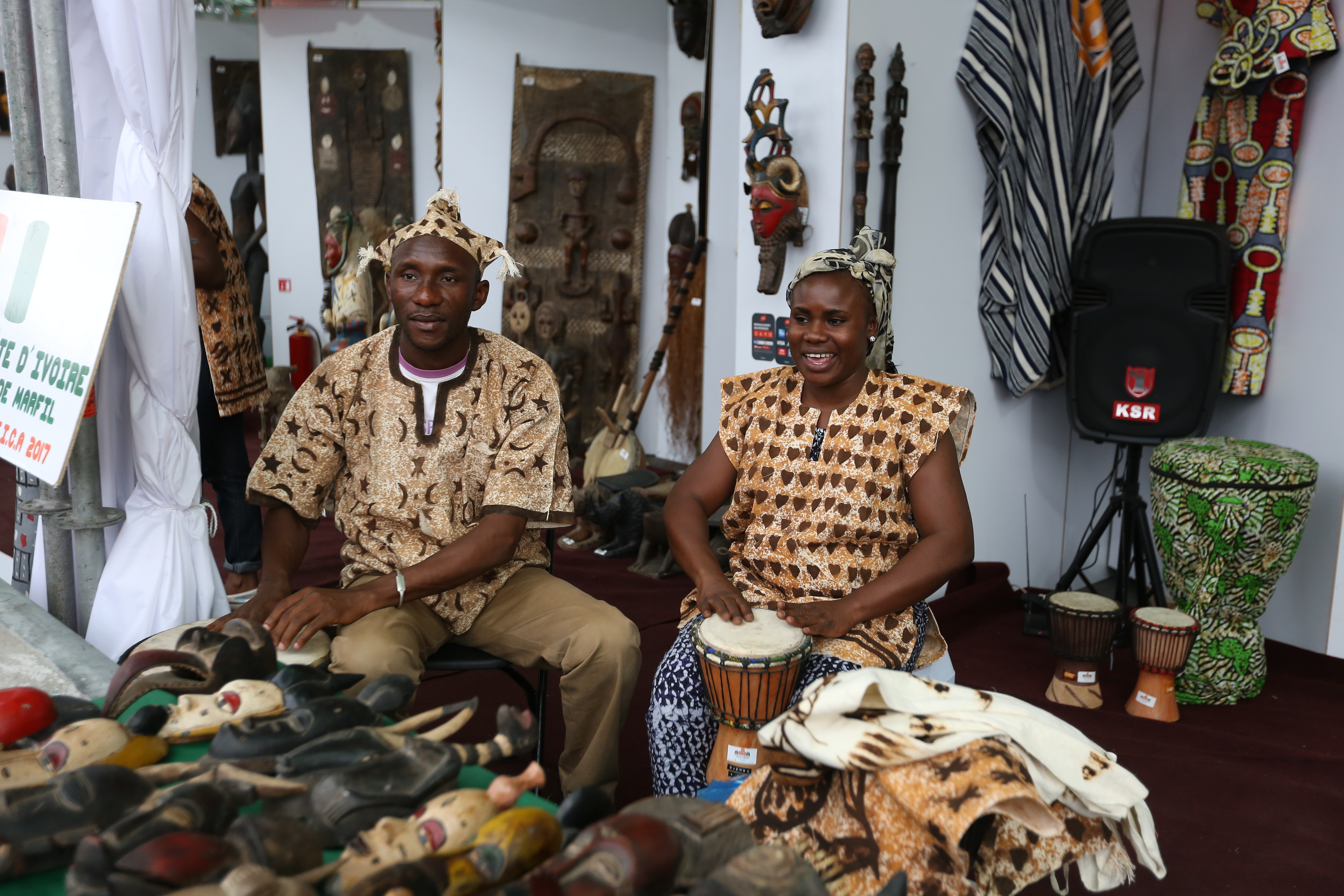
Ivory Coast stall at the 2017 Feria Internacional de las Culturas Amigas in Mexico City.

Diplomatic relations between the Ivory Coast (Côte d'Ivoire) and Mexico were established on 13 November 1975. In 1981, Ivory Coast opened an embassy in Mexico City, however, the embassy was closed in 1990 for financial reasons. In 1981, Ivorian Foreign Minister Simeon Aké paid a visit to Mexico to attend the North-South Summit in Cancún.

In March 2002, Ivorian Foreign Minister Aboudramane Sangaré paid a visit to Mexico to attend the International Conference on Financing for Development Summit in Monterrey. In 2004, Ivory Coast re-opened its embassy in Mexico.

Relations between both nations became limited during the First Ivorian Civil War (2002-2004) and Second Ivorian Civil War (2010-2011). In 2009, Mexico was a non-permanent member of the United Nations Security Council and was responsible for enforcing and maintaining the United Nations Security Council Resolution 1572 on an arms embargo to the Ivory Coast. In May 2008, two Mexican senators paid a visit to the Ivory Coast and met with Ivorian Parliamentarians and with Ivorian President Laurent Gbagbo.

In December 2013, Mexican President Enrique Peña Nieto, while traveling to South Africa to attend the funeral for Nelson Mandela, made a stopover in Ivory Coast. President Peña Nieto was received at the airport by the Ivorian Minister of Petroleum and Energy, Adama Toungara. On his return home to Mexico from South Africa, President Peña Nieto made a second stopover in Ivory Coast and was met by the Secretary General of the Ministry of Foreign Affairs, Claude Dassys Beke.

In February 2016, the National Autonomous University of Mexico bestowed the "UNESCO-UNAM Jaime Torres Bodet International Award" to Ivorian poet and novelist Bernard Binlin Dadié for his modern literature of the African continent. In May 2019, Ivorian Foreign Minister Marcel Amon-Tanoh paid a visit to Mexico and met with Mexican Foreign Minister Marcelo Ebrard. During the visit, both nations stressed the importance of strengthening bilateral political dialogue.

In 2023, both nations celebrated 48 years of diplomatic relations.

== High-level visits ==
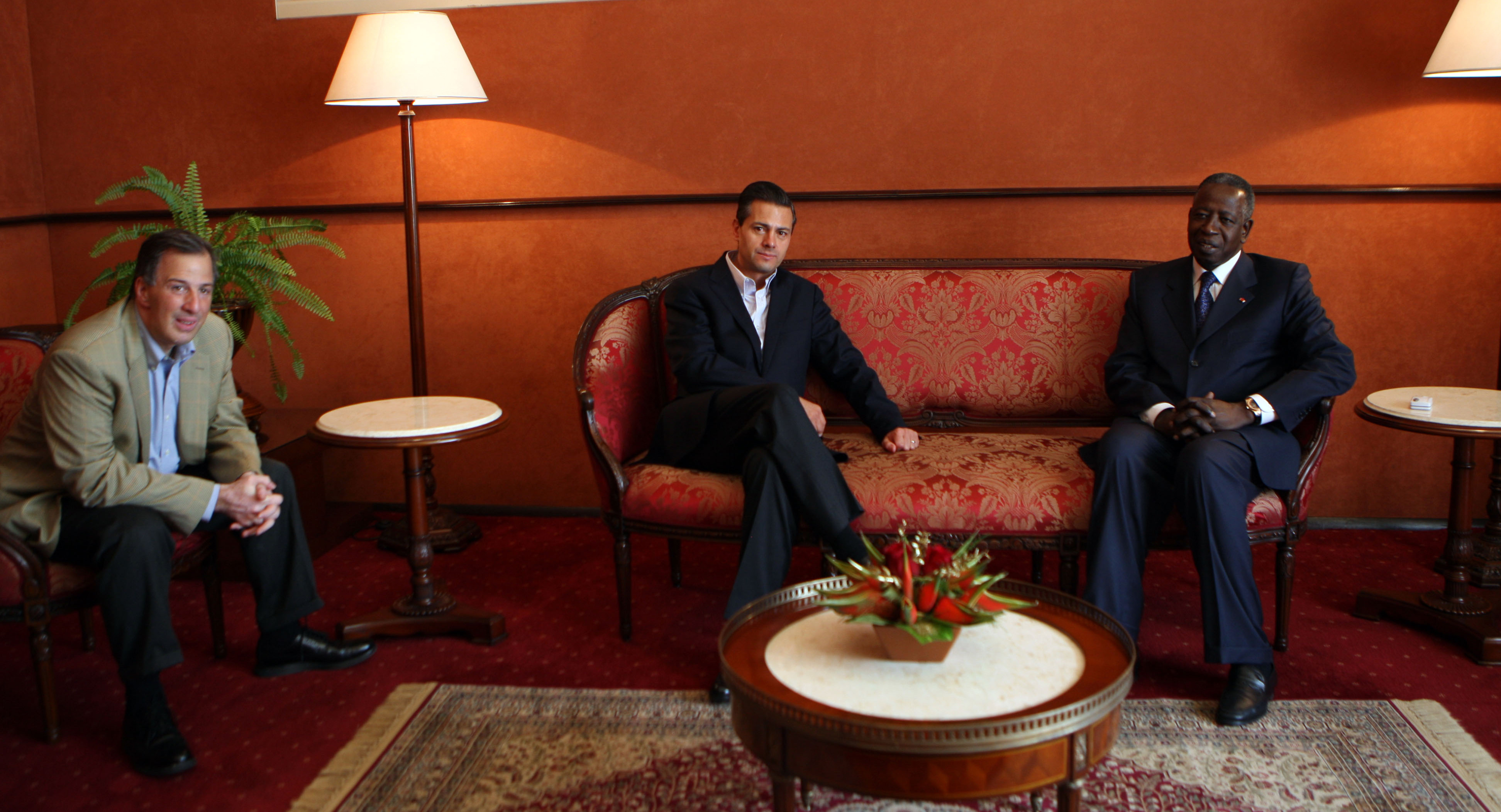
Mexican President Enrique Peña Nieto and Foreign Minister José Antonio Meade meeting with Ivorian Minister of Petroleum and Energy Adama Toungara in Abidjan; December 2013.

High-level visits from Ivory Coast to Mexico

- Foreign Minister Simeon Aké (1981)
- Foreign Minister Aboudramane Sangaré (2002)
- Foreign Secretary General Claude Dassys Beke (2013)
- Minister for Planning and Development Albert Abdallah Mabri Toikeusse (2014)
- Minister of the Environment Rémy Kouadio (2014)
- Foreign Minister Charles Koffi Diby (2015)
- Foreign Minister Marcel Amon-Tanoh (2019)

High-level visits from Mexico to Ivory Coast

- Senator Salomón Jara Cruz (2008)
- Senator José Julián Sacramento (2008)
- President Enrique Peña Nieto (2013)
- Foreign Minister José Antonio Meade (2013)
- Foreign Undersecretary Lourdes Aranda Bezaury (2013)
- Director General of ProMéxico Francisco González Díaz (2016)

== Bilateral agreements ==
Both nations have signed a few bilateral agreements such as a Memorandum of Understanding for the Establishment of a Mechanism of Consultation in Matters of Mutual Interest (1999); Agreement on Educational and Cultural Cooperation (1999); Memorandum of Understanding between ProMéxico and the Center for the Promotion of Côte d'Ivoire investment (2016); and a Memorandum of Understanding in Academic Collaboration between both nations Ministries of Foreign Affairs (2019).

== Trade ==
In 2023, trade between Ivory Coast and Mexico totaled US$167 million. Ivory Coast's main exports to Mexico include: cocoa paste, cocoa beans and powder, butter fat and oil cocoa, rubber, wood, and articles of aluminum. Mexico's main exports to Ivory Coast include: tubes and pipes of iron or steel, malt extract, fish, meat, medicines, discs, tapes and other media for sound recordings; machinery, tractors, motor cars and other vehicles. Mexican multinational company Sukarne operates in Ivory Coast.

== Diplomatic missions ==
- Ivory Coast has an embassy in Mexico City.
- Mexico is accredited to Ivory Coast from its embassy in Rabat, Morocco and maintains an honorary consulate in Abidjan.

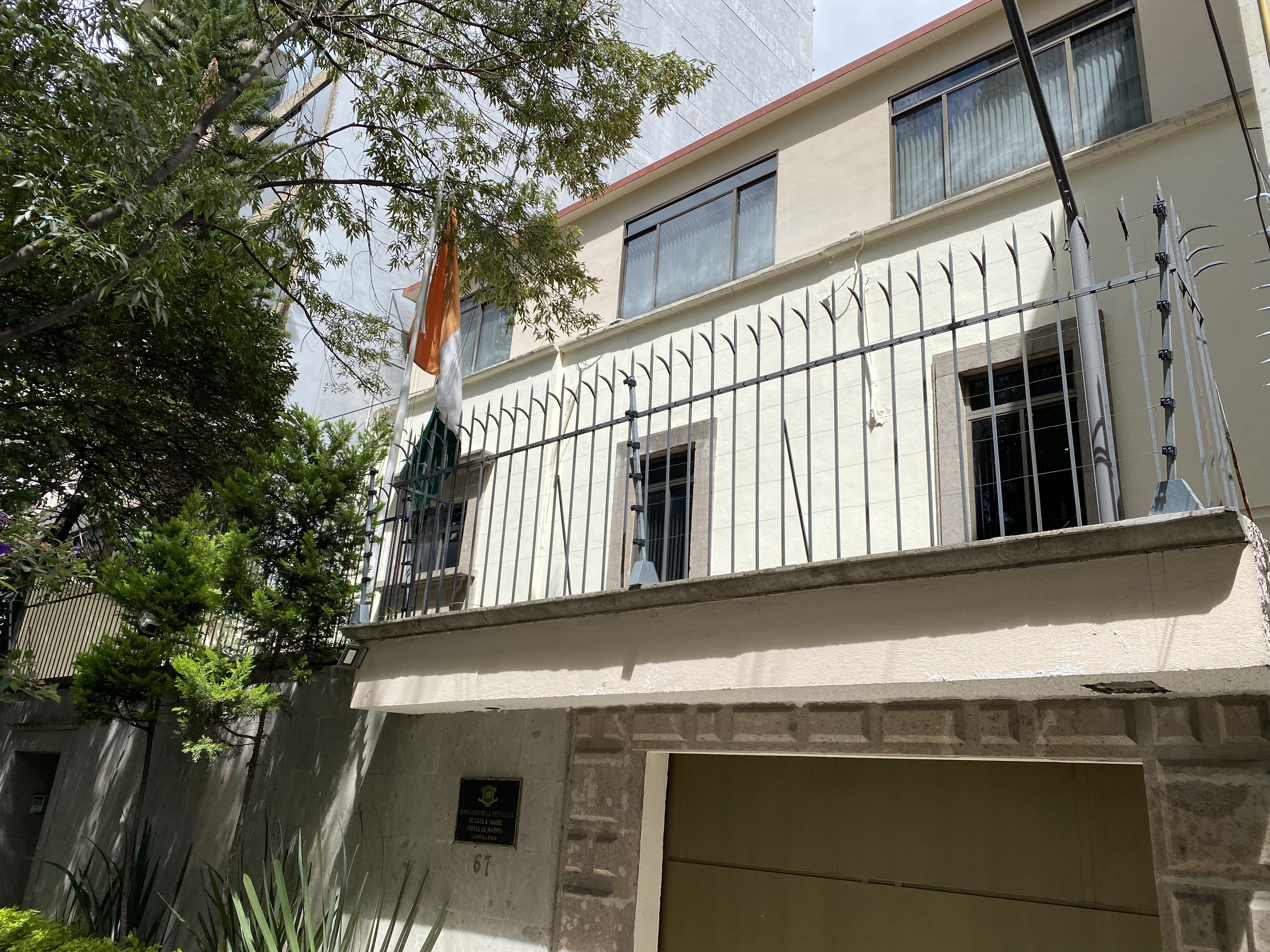
Embassy of Ivory Coast in Mexico City

== Ivorians in Mexico ==
- Aké Arnaud Loba
- Franck Boli
- Koffi Dakoi

== Gallery ==
Exhibition of the culture of Ivory Coast at the National Museum of Anthropology in Mexico City; 2026

Description of the history that unites Ivory Coast and Mexico

Mancala door from Ivory Coast exhibited at the National Museum of Anthropology

Map of the route of enslaved people from Africa to Mexico and the Americas
