= Marcel Amon-Tanoh =

Ivorian politician (born 1951)

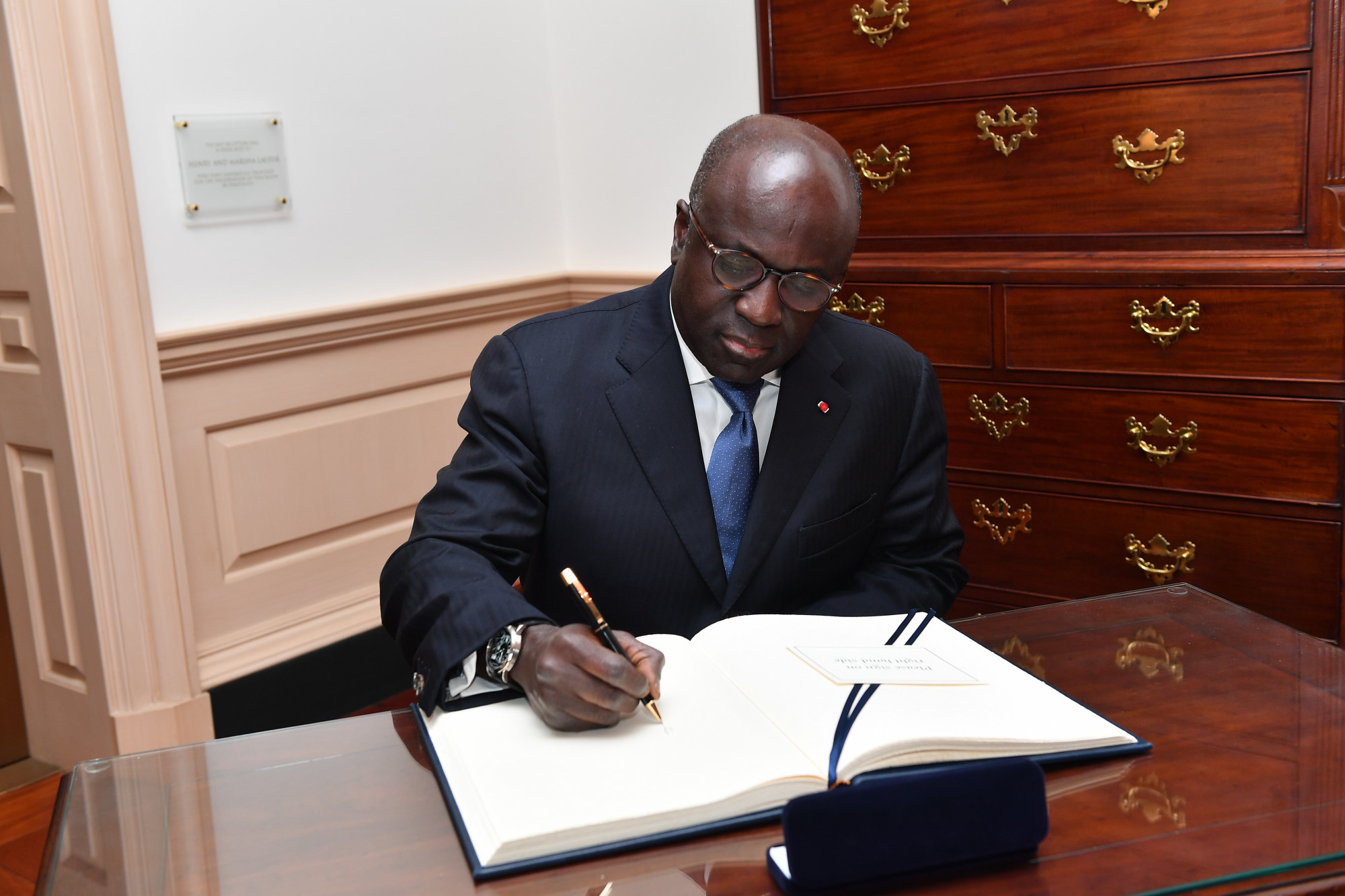

Minister of Foreign Affairs
- In office 26 November 2016 – 19 March 2020
- President: Alassane Ouattara
- Prime Minister: Daniel Kablan Duncan; Amadou Gon Coulibaly
- Preceded by: Albert Toikeusse Mabri
- Succeeded by: Ally Coulibaly

Minister, Director of Cabinet of the President
- In office March 2012 – November 2016
- President: Alassane Ouattara

Director of Cabinet of the President
- In office December 2010 – February 2012
- President: Alassane Ouattara

Minister of Construction, Urbanism and Housing
- In office December 2005 – February 2010
- President: Laurent Gbagbo

Minister of Tourism
- In office March 2003 – December 2005
- President: Laurent Gbagbo

Minister of Transport
- In office August 2002 – March 2003
- President: Laurent Gbagbo

Personal details
- Born: November 25, 1951 (age 74) Abidjan, French Ivory Coast
- Party: Democratic Party of Côte d'Ivoire – African Democratic Rally
- Education: Paris 8 University

Marcel Amon-Tanoh (born November 25, 1951, Abidjan) is an Ivorian politician.

He started working in France as a researcher at the Institute for Scientific, Economic and Commercial Research. After this French experience, he became the Secretary General of the City Hall of Cocody, an elite neighborhood in the Abidjan department, for several months. From 1991 to 1995, he was Secretary General of the Democratic Party of Côte d'Ivoire.

In addition to his political career, Marcel Amon-Tano was also involved in business. He was the managing director of a Parisian clothing company, then of an agricultural import and export company, and director of an agro-industrial company. Since 2001, he has devoted himself fully to his role as a public servant, serving as Minister of Tourism (2003–2005), and Chief of Staff to the President (2010–2012).

He has served as the Minister of Foreign Minister of the Ivory Coast from 25 November 2016 until 19 March 2020, under President Alassane Ouattara.

In November 2016, President Ouattara dismissed then-Foreign Minister Albert Toikeusse Mabri and appointed Amon-Tanoh as interim foreign minister. Two months later, Oattara retained Amon-Tanoh as his permanent foreign minister as part of a January 2017 cabinet reshuffle. Amon-Tanoh resigned on 19 March 2020.

In December 2024, Amon-Tanoh was appointed special advisor to President Ouattara at the RHDP. This appointment is interpreted as Amon-Tanoh's return to the president's inner circle. He is expected to prepare Alassane Ouattara's likely candidacy for a fourth term in the 2025 presidential election.

== See also ==
- Kandia Camara
