= Gnénéma Coulibaly Mamadou =

Ivorian politician (died 2026)

Minister of Justice
- In office 2012–2017
- President: Alassane Ouattara
- Prime Minister: Daniel Kablan Duncan
- Preceded by: Jeannot Ahoussou-Kouadio
- Succeeded by: Sansan Kambile

Personal details
- Born: Korhogo, Ivory Coast
- Died: 22 October 2026

Gnénéma Coulibaly Mamadou (died 22 October 2026) was an Ivorian politician. He served as minister of justice of Ivory Coast from 2012 to 2017.

Mamadou died on 22 October 2026.
