= Amadou Koné =

Amadou Koné may refer to:

- Amadou Koné (writer) (born 1953), Ivorian writer
- Amadou Koné (politician) (born 1966), Ivorian politician
- Amadou Koné (footballer, born May 2005), Ivorian football midfielder
- Amadou Koné (soccer, born January 2005), Canadian soccer forward
