= Kandia Camara =

Ivorian teacher and politician (born 1959)

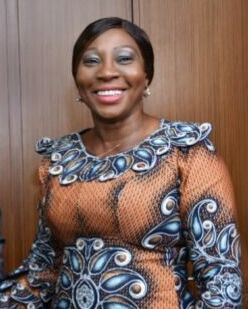
- Camara in 2022

President of the Senate of Ivory Coast
- Incumbent
- Assumed office 12 October 2023
- Preceded by: Jeannot Ahoussou-Kouadio

Minister of Foreign Affairs
- In office 6 April 2021 – 12 October 2023
- President: Alassane Ouattara
- Prime Minister: Patrick Achi
- Preceded by: Ally Coulibaly
- Succeeded by: Mahamat Zene Cherif

Personal details
- Born: Kandia Kamissoko Camara; 17 June 1959 (age 66)
- Education: Lancaster University

Kandia Camara (born 17 June 1959) is an Ivorian teacher and politician who is the mayor of Abobo since 10 October 2021 and president of the senate of Ivory Coast since 12 October 2023. She is the former minister of foreign affairs in the government of President Alassane Ouattara.

She is a professional handball player and was part of the ASC Bouaké team that won African Cup of Champion Clubs in 1981.

== Education and career ==
Camara earned a degree in English from the University of Abidjan and an Advanced Studies Certificate in Education from Lancaster University in England. Camara is a professional high-level handball player and a two-time champion of Côte d'Ivoire in 1974 and 1980 and won the African Cup of Champion Clubs in 1981 with ASC Bouaké. From 1983 to 1986, she taught English at the Modern College, de Cocody and at Treich-la-Plène College. She worked as a specialist English teacher at the Abidjan professional hotel school from 1986 to 2002. She was a member of the national office of the National Union of Secondary Teachers of Côte d'Ivoire (SYNESCI) from 1987 to 1991 and a member of the Association of Women Teachers of Francophone Africa from 1989 to 1991. She was secretary general of the national office of the Union des femmes du PDCI (UFPDCI) and a municipal councillor at the town hall of Cocody between 1990 and 1994. In 1994, she became the Secretary General of the Rassemblement des Femmes Républicaines (RFR) until 1998 when she assumed the office of the national president of the organisation before resigning in May 2006.

Camara became Deputy mayor of the Municipality of Abobo in 2001 and served in this office until 2003, when she was appointed Special Advisor to the Prime Minister of the Government of National Reconciliation and Transition and remained in this position until 2010. In 2014, she was appointed Minister of National Education.

She served as minister of foreign affairs in the Achi I government and Achi II government.
