= Bouabré =

Bouabré is a surname. Notable people with the surname include:

- Frédéric Bruly Bouabré (1923–2014), Ivorian artist
- Paul Antoine Bohoun Bouabré (1957–2012), Ivorian politician and economist
