= Aboudramane Sangaré =

Ivorian politician (1946–2018)

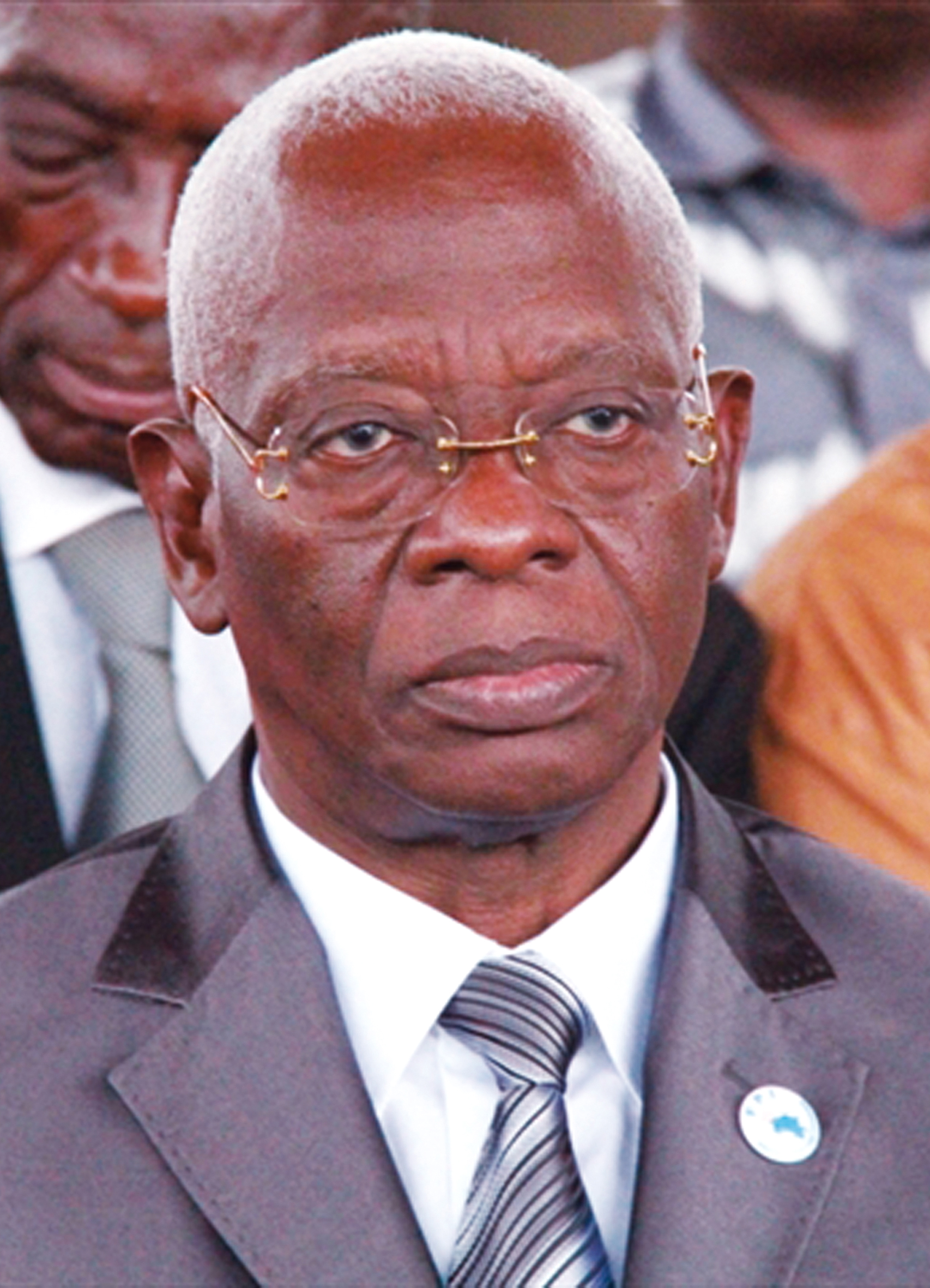

Minister of Foreign Affairs
- In office October 2000 – March 2003
- President: Laurent Gbagbo
- Preceded by: Charles Gomis
- Succeeded by: Bamba Mamadou

Personal details
- Born: March 9, 1946 M'Bahiakro, French Ivory Coast
- Died: 3 November 2018 (aged 72) Abidjan, Ivory Coast
- Political party: Ivorian Popular Front

Aboudramane Sangaré, also spelled Abou Drahamane Sangaré, (March 9, 1946 – November 3, 2018) was an Ivorian politician and co-founder of the Ivorian Popular Front (FPI) political party. He served as Foreign Minister of Ivory Coast from October 2000 to March 2003 under President Laurent Gbagbo, a close political ally. Sangare was president of a dissident, pro-Gbagbo faction of Ivorian Popular Front members at the time of his death in 2018.

== Biography ==
Sangaré first met future President Laurent Gbagbo in 1970 while both were students at the University of Abidjan. In 1971, both were imprisoned by the government of then-President Felix Houphouet-Boigny for their opposition to his government. During the 1980s, Sangare and Gbagbo began to set up their clandestine opposition party. Gbagbo, Sangare, and other allies co-founded the Ivorian Popular Front (FPI) in 1988. The party was legalized in 1990.

The government of then-President Henri Konan Bédié imprisoned Sangare from 1994 to 1995.

Laurent Gbagbo became President of Ivory Coast in 2000. He appointed Sangare Foreign Minister from October 2000 to March 2003. The duo remained close after Sangare left office and became head of the FPI.

Sangare remained a close loyalist of former President Gbagbo, former First Lady Simone Gbagbo, and their family even after the ex-president's arrest and trial by the International Criminal Court (ICC) for war crimes. Sangare denounced the arrest and extradition of Gbagbo to the ICC in The Hague, describing the former president as a "hostage". Sangare also led boycotts of subsequent Ivorian national elections to call for the release of Gbagbo. He and his faction of the FPI condemned the government of President Alassane Ouattara as "undemocratic" at rallies calling for Gbagbo's release. Gbagbo remains on trial for crimes against humanity, as of 2019.

Sangare, who suffered from cancer, was hospitalized at the Hôtel Dieu hospital in Abidjan in October 2018. He died in the same hospital just fifteen days later on November 3, 2018, at the age of 72.

According to Radio France Internationale, Sangare's death dealt a significant blow to the Ivorian Popular Front (FPI) party. The RFI described Sangara as "one of the most respected members" within the FPI and an important ally of the Gbagbos. Sangare was president of a dissident, pro-Gbagbo faction of the FPI at the time of his death.

Sangare's death came just ten days after the unexplained disappearance of another major FPI leader, former director general of the port of Abidjan, Marcel Gossio.
