= Téné Birahima Ouattara =

Ivorian politician

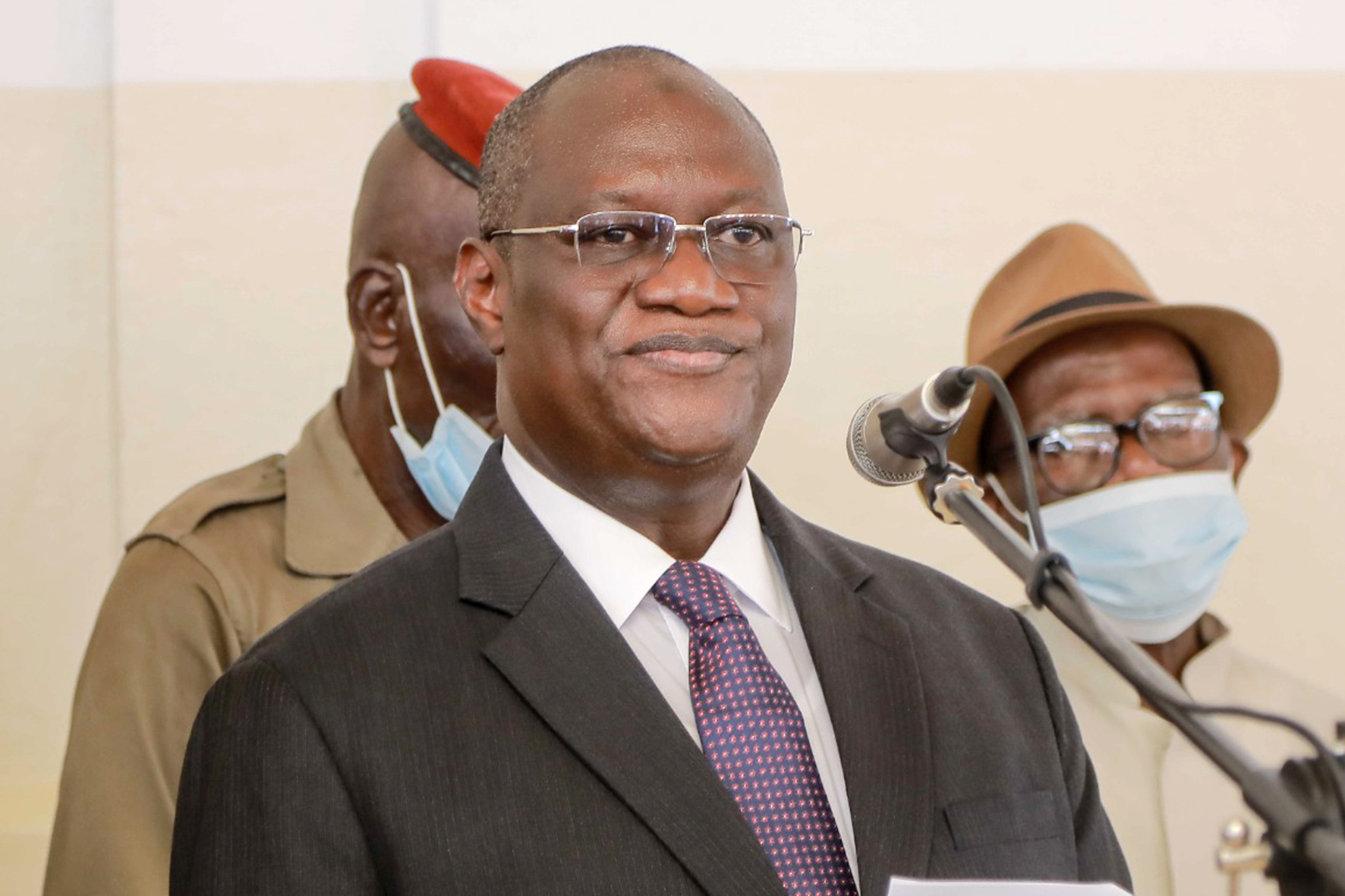

Deputy/Vice-Prime Minister of Ivory Coast
- Incumbent
- Assumed office 24 January 2026
- President: Alassane Ouattara
- Prime Minister: Robert Beugré Mambé
- Preceded by: Office established

Minister of Defense of Ivory Coast
- Incumbent
- Assumed office 8 March 2021 (Note: Acting: 8–26 March 2021)
- President: Alassane Ouattara
- Prime Minister: Patrick Achi; Robert Beugré Mambé
- Preceded by: Hamed Bakayoko

Minister of Presidential Affairs of Ivory Coast
- In office 2012–2019
- President: Alassane Ouattara
- Prime Minister: Jeannot Ahoussou-Kouadio (2012); Daniel Kablan Duncan (2012–2017); Amadou Gon Coulibaly (2017–2019)
- Preceded by: Hamed Bakayoko

Personal details
- Born: 12 February 1956 (age 70)
- Party: Rally of the Republicans
- Relatives: Alassane Ouattara (brother)

Téné Birahima Ouattara (born 12 February 1956) is an Ivorian politician who is currently the Minister of Defense of Ivory Coast. He has previously served as the country's Minister of Presidential Affairs and head of the national intelligence department. He is the brother of Ivorian President Alassane Ouattara.

== Early life ==
Téné Birahima Ouattara has 11 brothers and one sister. He is the younger brother of Ivorian President Alassane Ouattara. Due to similarities in their appearance, Téné Birahima Ouattara has been nicknamed Photocopie (photocopy). He graduated from the University of Abidjan in economics in 1982. He worked for 10 years for Société Générale Ivory Coast, and worked as the bank's director general. He then worked for Atlantic Bank Ivory Coast from 1992 to 1999, and then for SNG.

== Career ==
Ouattara was a founding member of the Rassemblement des Républicains (Rally of the Republicans), and has been the party's treasurer. He has been a member of the Ivory Coast's National Security Council. In 2011, he became a Member of Parliament for Kong. That year, Ouattra also became head of the Ivory Coast Treasury. In the role, he reduced the running cost of the president's office by around 500 million CFA francs, including through the reduction of 900 staff. In 2013, he became leader of Kong town council, succeeding his brother Gaoussou, who had held the role since 1995. At the 2016 Ivorian parliamentary election, Ouattra won 99.76% of the votes in the Kong area. In 2018, he left the role in Kong, and became leader of Tchologo regional council.

In March 2012, Ouattara became the minister of presidential affairs. In the role, he had authority in the Ivorian Republican Guard and the Security Group of the president. Following a cabinet reshuffle in 2019, Ouattra was replaced as minister of presidential affairs, and not given a role in his brother's cabinet. In February 2019, he was appointed head of the national intelligence department (ULGB). He was heavily criticised after a 2020 attack in Kafolo, near to the border with Burkina Faso, killed 13 soldiers.

In March 2021, Ouattra became the acting minister of defense of Ivory Coast, after Hamed Bakayoko was taken ill. After Bakayoko's death, Ouattra continued as the acting minister of defense. On 6 April 2021, Ouattara was confirmed as the new minister of defense.
