= Hamed Bakayoko =

Prime Minister of Ivory Coast (1965–2021)

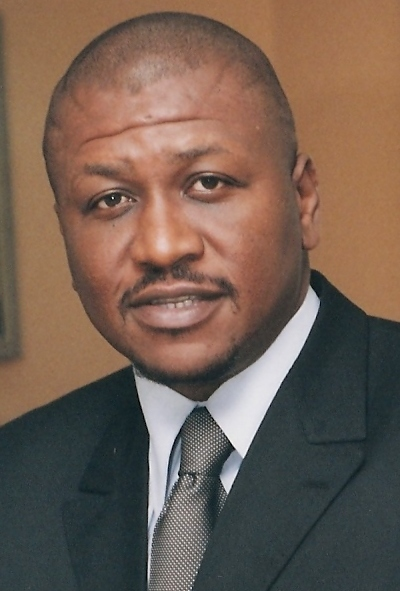
- Bakayoko in 2007

Prime Minister of Ivory Coast
- In office 8 July 2020 – 8 March 2021
- President: Alassane Ouattara
- Preceded by: Amadou Gon Coulibaly
- Succeeded by: Patrick Achi

Minister of Defense of Ivory Coast
- In office 19 July 2017 – 8 March 2021
- President: Alassane Ouattara
- Prime Minister: Amadou Gon Coulibaly (2017–2020); Himself (2020–2021)
- Preceded by: Alassane Ouattara
- Succeeded by: Téné Birahima Ouattara

Personal details
- Born: 8 March 1965 Abidjan, Ivory Coast
- Died: 10 March 2021 (aged 56) Freiburg im Breisgau, Germany
- Party: Rally of the Republicans

Hamed Bakayoko (8 March 1965 – 10 March 2021) was an Ivorian politician who served as Prime Minister of Côte d'Ivoire from 8 July 2020 until his death on 10 March 2021. He had previously served as the country's Minister of New Technologies, Information and Communication, Minister of the Interior and Minister of Defense.

== Career ==
In 1990, Bakayoko started working as a journalist for Radiodiffusion Television Ivoirienne. In 1991, he founded the newspaper Le Patriote, and interviewed Alassane Ouattara at his wedding. He later worked for Radio Nostalgie and Nostalgie Afrique. He worked as the head of the Ivorian branch of Radio Nostalgie. In the 1990s, he was a founder member of the student branch of the Democratic Party of Ivory Coast – African Democratic Rally. Later that decade, he joined the Rassemblement des Républicains. During the First Ivorian Civil War, he worked in mediation.

Between 2007 and 2011, Bakayoko was Minister of New Technologies, Information and Communication in Guillaume Soro's government. In 2011, he became the Ivory Coast's Minister of the Interior in Alassane Ouattara's government. He supported Roch Marc Christian Kaboré in the 2015 Burkinabé general election. In 2016, he remained as Minister of the Interior in Daniel Kablan Duncan's new government. In 2017, he became Ivorian Minister for Defence. at a time when the Army had been facing many mutinies. That year, he worked as a mediator in negotiations with Togo. In 2018, Bakayoko became mayor of Abobo district of Abidjan.

In May 2020, Bakayoko became Acting Prime Minister, when Prime Minister Amadou Gon Coulibaly went to France for a heart exam and rest. Coulibaly returned on 2 July and resumed his duties, but less than a week later, he became unwell during a cabinet meeting and died. Bakayoko took over on an interim basis and was confirmed to the position on 30 July 2020. On 8 March 2021, he was replaced by Patrick Achi as interim prime minister and President Ouattara's younger brother Téné as interim defence minister.

== Personal life ==
Bakayoko was born in Adjamé, Abidjan, Ivory Coast. He studied medicine at the University of Ouagadougou. Bakayoko was a grand-master in the Grand Lodge of Côte d'Ivoire.

=== Health and death ===
Bakayoko announced on 6 April 2020 that he had tested positive for COVID-19, followed on 17 April by an announcement that he had made a full recovery. He subsequently suffered a second coronavirus infection and severe malaria.

He received lengthy treatment in France twice in early 2021. On 6 March 2021, he was transferred to University Medical Center Freiburg for further treatment. He was said to undergo cancer treatment there and was said to be "in critical condition". Ivorian president Alassane Ouattara appointed Patrick Achi as acting prime minister on 8 March. On 10 March 2021, Ouattara announced via Twitter that Bakayoko had died, two days after his 56th birthday.

Political offices
Preceded by Amadou Gon Coulibaly	Prime Minister of the Ivory Coast; 2020–2021	Succeeded by Patrick Achi
