= Anne Désirée Ouloto =

Ivorian politician

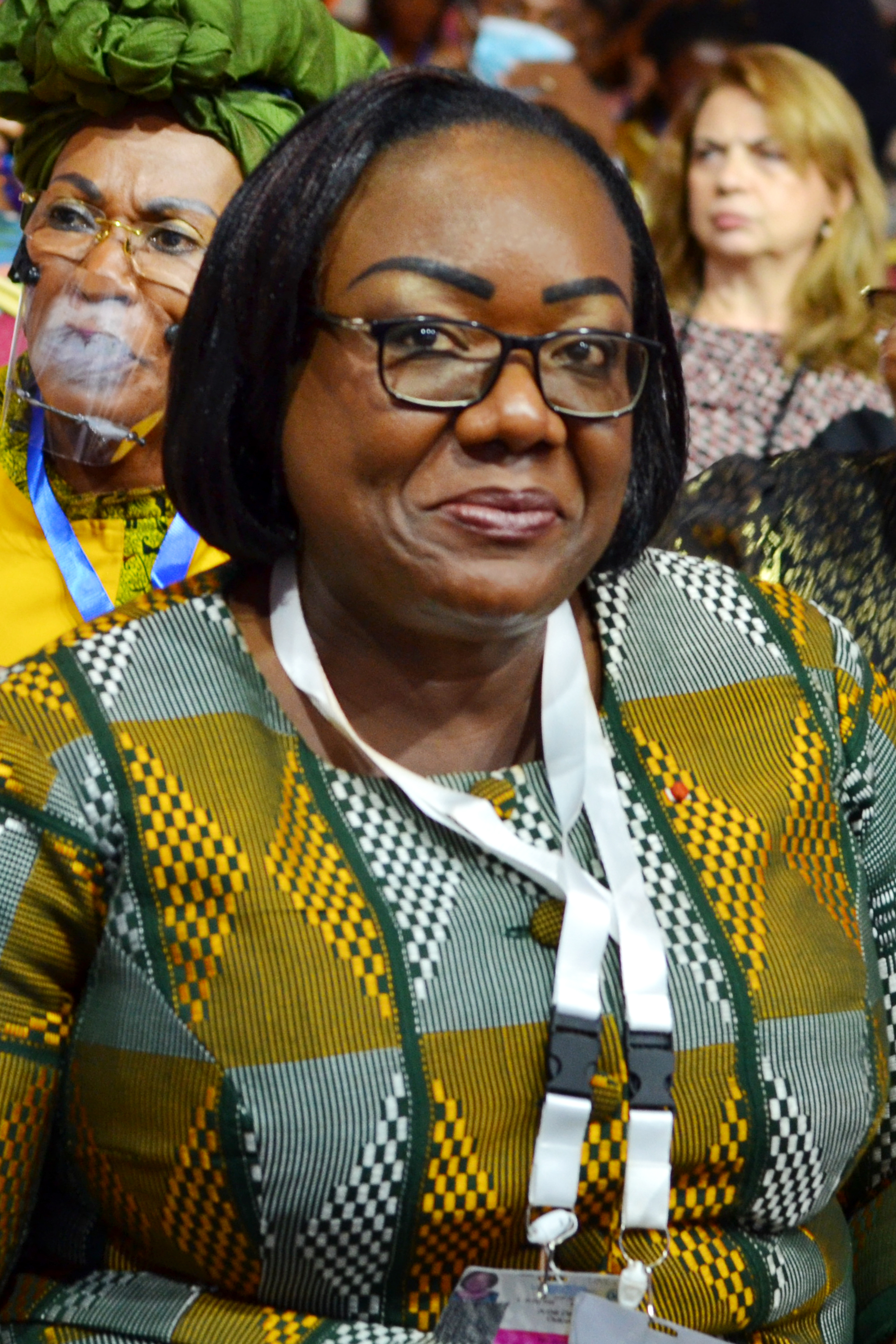
Anne Désirée Ouloto in 2010.

Anne Désirée Ouloto (born 20 April 1966) is an Ivorian politician from Rally of the Republicans who serves as Minister of Public Service in the Achi II government.

Trained as a schoolteacher, she was elected as a member of parliament for the Rassemblement des Républicains (RDR) and has held several ministerial portfolios since 2011. On April 6, 2021, she was appointed Minister of the Civil Service and Modernization of the Administration, and was reappointed to Prime Minister Robert Beugré Mambé's government on October 17, 2023.

== Biography ==
Anne Ouloto hails from the Cavally region of the Toulepleu department.

With a literary baccalaureate, she abandoned the law courses she had started at Félix-Houphouët-Boigny University during the student crisis of 1990, and became a primary school teacher. In 2000, she obtained a position as legal assistant at the Autorité nationale de régulation du secteur de l'électricité (ANARE), where she remained until 2005. In 2006, as a political activist, she became a research officer and then chief of staff at the Ministry of Higher Education. During the Ivorian crisis of 2010-2011, she was spokesperson for candidate Alassane Ouattara. She then became a Member of Parliament and Minister.

In June 2011, Anne Désirée Ouloto was appointed by President Alassane Ouattara as Minister of Urban Hygiene. She held this post until November 2012, before being put in charge of the Ministry of Solidarity, Family, Women and Children.
