= Ministry of Justice (Ivory Coast) =

Government department

The Ministry of Justice and Human Rights of Ivory Coast is a department of the government of Ivory Coast. According to statute, the ministry audits the judicial hierarchy via its Central Administration unit, and executes a rating and appraisal system to determine which judicial officer will advance in rank. The ministry also has other responsibilities such as overseeing the National Chamber of Bailiffs of Ivory Coast.

== List of ministers (Post-1960 upon achieving independence) ==
- Germain Coffi Gadeau (1960–1963)
- Nanlo Bamba (1963-1966)
- Camille Alliali (1966–1983)
- Lanzeni Coulibaly (1984–1986)
- Noel Nemin (1987–1990) [also served as Attorney General]
- Jacqueline Oble (1991–1994) [1st female]
- Faustin Kouame (1994–1996)
- Jean Kouakou Brou (1996–1999)
- Essy N'gatta (2000)
- Siene Oulai (2001–2002)
- Desire Asenyini Tagro (2002–2003)
- Henriette Diabate (2003–2006)
- Mamadou Kone (2006–2010)
- Jeannot Kouadio Ahoussou (2011–2012)
- Gnénéma Coulibaly Mamadou (2012–2017)
- Sansan Kambile (2017–2018)
- Aimée Zebeyoux (2018–2021)

== See also ==
- Justice ministry
- Politics of Ivory Coast
