= Kaba Nialé =

Ivorian politician (born 1962)

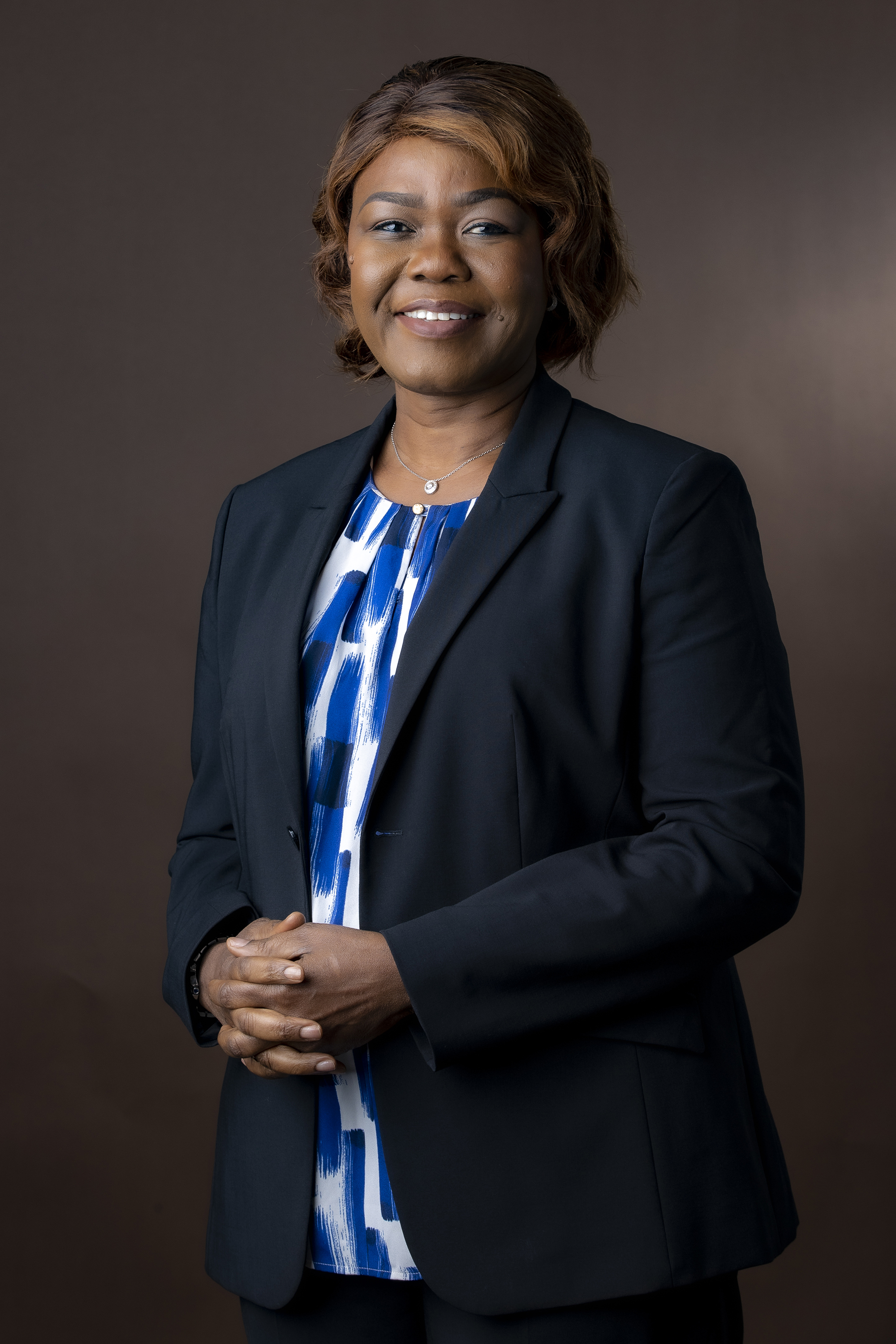
Image of Kaba Nialé

Kaba Nialé (born 1962) is an Ivorian politician who has been serving as Minister of Planning and Development and President of the Board of Governors of African Development Bank (AFDB) since 2019.

Nialé is the first woman to head the Ministry of Economy and Finance in Côte d'Ivoire. She was listed among “Top 50, most powerful women in Africa” by the pan-African weekly Jeune Afrique in 2015.

== Early life and education ==
Nialé was born in Bouko in 1962. She obtained a baccalaureate series C in 1981 and a master's degree in economics with public economy option from the University of Abidjan-Cocody in 1989. She earned an engineering degree from the European Center for the Training of Economic Statisticians in developing countries (CESD) and a Diploma of Advanced Studies in International Economics and Development Economics at the University of Paris 1- Panthéon-Sorbonne. In 1993, Nialé attended the Institute of the International Monetary Fund (IMf) in Economic Policy Management.

== Career ==
Nialé began her career as a researcher and soon after became chief of staff to the Prime Minister from 1991 to 2000 when she was moved to the Ministry of the Economy and Finance as Deputy Chief of Staff at the Ministry of the Economy and Finance. From 2003 to 2005, she served as the Chief of Staff to the Minister of Crafts and Supervision of the Informal Sector before her appointment as General Manager of Côte d'Ivoire Tourisme from 2005 to 2007. She was appointed Minister of Housing Promotion of Côte d'Ivoire in the government of Prime Minister Guillaume Soro, serving from 2011 to 2012.

Nialé emerged the first woman to head the Ministry of Economy and Finance in Côte d'Ivoire when she was appointed on 22 November 2012 by President Alassane Ouattara and served until January 2016 when she was redeployed to the Ministry of Planning and Development. During her tenure as Economy and Finance Minister, Ivorian economy achieved annual growth rate averaging 9% and was rated one of the most dynamic economies in Africa by international agencies such as Moody's and Fitch.

== Other activities ==
- African Development Bank (AfDB), Ex-Officio Member of the Board of Governors (since 2019)
- ECOWAS Bank for Investment and Development (EBID), Ex-Officio Member of the Board of Governors (since 2019)
- Islamic Development Bank (IsDB), Ex-Officio Member of the Board of Governors (since 2019)

== Controversy ==
In 2014, the National Press Council (CNP) announced that publisher Alafe Wakili and Traore Moussa, president of the UNJCI journalists’ union, tried to bribe a colleague to halt articles by popular satirical newspaper L’Eléphant Déchaîné, which accused Nialé of mismanaging government contracts.
