= Minister of the Economy and Finance (Ivory Coast) =

This is a list of individuals who have served as Minister of the Economy and Finance (Ministres de l'Économie et des Finances) of Ivory Coast.

== Ministers ==
- Raphaël Saller, April 1959 - January 1966
- Henri Konan Bedie, January 1966 - July 1977
- Abdoulaye Koné, July 1977 - September 1989
- Moise Koumoue Koffi, October 1989 - November 1990
- Alassane Ouattara, October 1990 - November 1993
- Daniel Kablan Duncan, (minister-delegate) November 1990 - December 1993
- Niamien N'Goran, December 1993 - December 1999
- N'golo Coulibaly, January 2000 – May 2000
- Mamadou Koulibaly, May 2000 - January 2001
- Paul Antoine Bohoun Bouabre, January 2001 – December 2005
- Charles Konan Banny, December 2005 – April 2007
- Charles Koffi Diby, April 2007 – November 2012
- Kaba Nialé, November 2012 - January 2016
- Adama Koné, January 2016 - September 2019
- Adama Coulibaly, September 2019 -

== See also ==
- Economy of Ivory Coast
