= Robert Beugré Mambé =

Ivorian politician

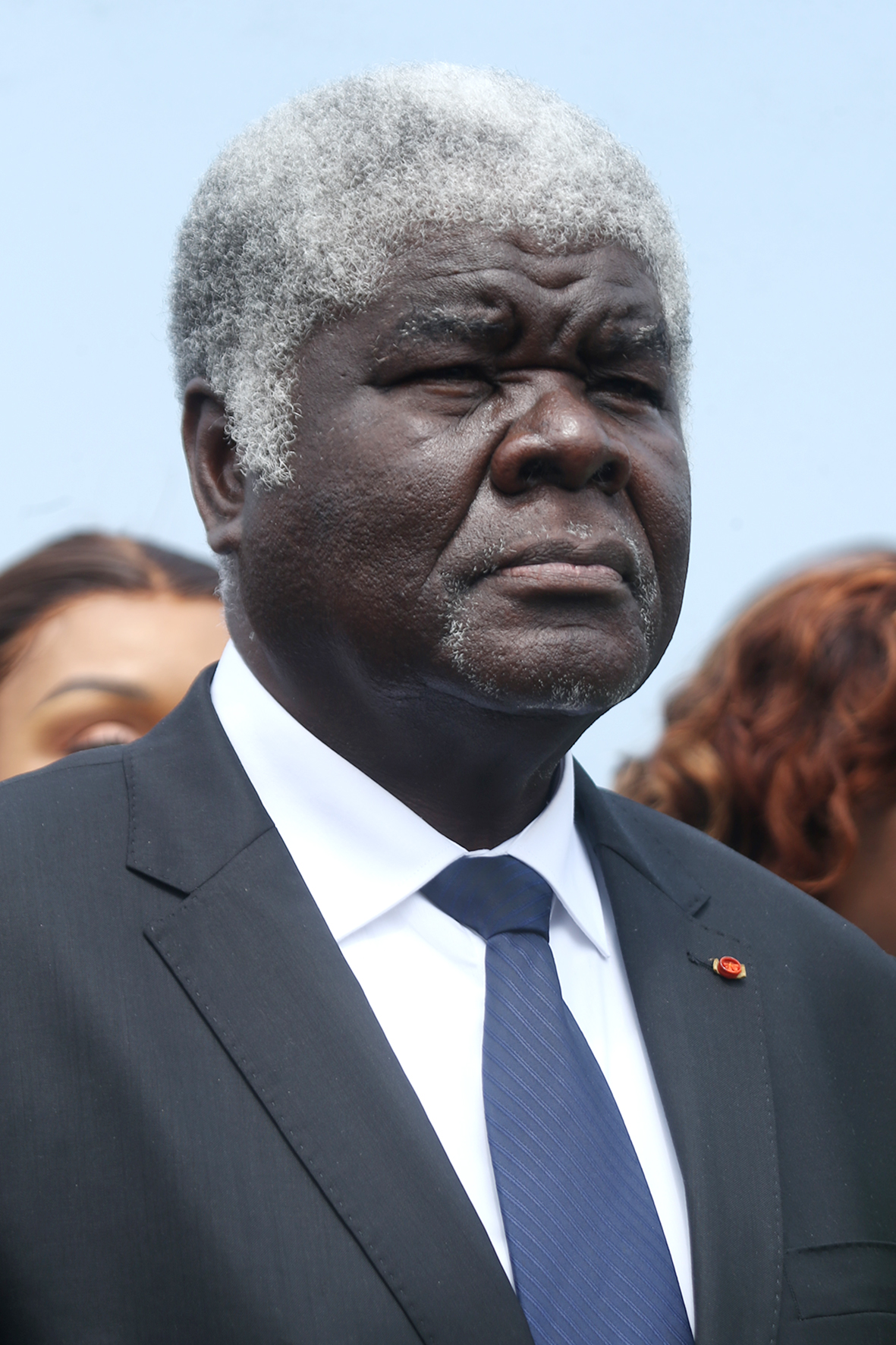
- Beugré Mambé in 2024

Prime Minister of Ivory Coast
- Incumbent
- Assumed office 17 October 2023
- President: Alassane Ouattara
- Deputy: Téné Birahima Ouattara
- Preceded by: Patrick Achi

Personal details
- Born: Abiaté, Ivory Coast
- Party: Democratic Party of Ivory Coast – African Democratic Rally; Rally of Houphouëtists for Democracy and Peace
- Spouse: Marthe Irma Djedji (died 31 October 2021)

Robert Beugré Mambé is an Ivorian civil engineer and politician who has been the Prime Minister of Ivory Coast since 2023. Prior to his tenure as prime minister he was the governor of the Autonomous District of Abidjan and president of the Independent Electoral Commission.

== Early life and education ==
Robert Beugré Mambé was born in Abiaté, Ivory Coast. He graduated from the National School of Public Works in 1976. He continued his education at the Center for Advanced Construction Studies in Paris, France, and the Central Bureau of Technical Studies in Abidjan.

== Career ==
Mambé's civil engineering career saw him involved in projects in Abidjan, Yopougon, Attécoubé, Gagnoa, and other areas of the Ivory Coast.

Mambé was the president of the Independent Electoral Commission from 2005 to 2010, but was removed after the 2010–2011 Ivorian crisis. He was appointed governor Autonomous District of Abidjan by President Alassane Ouattara on 4 May 2011. During his tenure as governor he launched the construction of 25,000 affordable housing units. He was a member of Democratic Party of Ivory Coast – African Democratic Rally before joining the Rally of Houphouëtists for Democracy and Peace.

Ouattara appointed Mambé to succeed Patrick Achi as prime minister on 17 October 2023. Mambé's cabinet mostly consisted of the ministers from Achi's cabinet.

== Personal life ==
Emlyon Business School gave him an honorary degree. He is lay preacher in the United Methodist Church. The Order of Ivory Merit was given to him in 1988. He is married and is the father of four children.

== Works cited ==
=== News ===
- "Ivory Coast: Governor Robert Beugré Mambé appointed Prime Minister". Africanews. 19 October 2023. Archived from the original on 28 June 2025.
- Amellal, Meriem (18 October 2023). "Ivory Coast: Beugré Mambé 1 government unveiled". France 24. Archived from the original on 28 June 2025.
- Diallo, Aïssatou; Richard, Florence (17 October 2023). "Côte d'Ivoire: Robert Beugré Mambé appointed prime minister". The Africa Report. Archived from the original on 28 June 2025.
- Mieu, Baudelaire (7 January 2015). "Robert Beugré Mambé: "Everyone is coming back to Abidjan to do business"". Jeune Afrique. Archived from the original on 28 June 2025.

=== Web ===
- "H.E. Robert Beugre Mambé". Africa CEO Forum. Archived from the original on 28 June 2025.
- "Robert Beugré Mambé". International Observatory of Mayors. Archived from the original on 28 June 2025.
- "ROBERT BEUGRÉ MAMBÉ: Prime Minister, Head of Government". Ivory Coast. Archived from the original on 28 June 2025.

Political offices
Preceded by Patrick Achi	Prime Minister of the Ivory Coast; 2023–present	Incumbent
