= Paul Antoine Bohoun Bouabré =

Ivorian politician

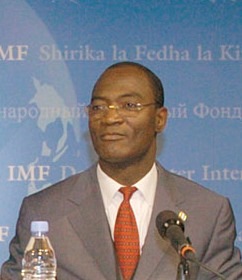
- Bohoun Bouabré in 2004
- Born: February 9, 1957
- Died: January 10, 2012 (aged 54); Jerusalem

Paul Antoine Bohoun Bouabré (February 9, 1957 – January 10, 2012), was an Ivorian politician and economist, and confidant of former President Laurent Gbagbo. An Associate Professor of Economics and economist, he was Minister of Economy and Finance and Minister of Planning and Development in Soro governments, a position he already held in the Banny government.

== Biography ==
Upon arrival at the post of Minister of Economy and Finance, he did not inspire confidence, but is now recognized as the principal architect of the maintenance of the Ivorian economy. While the country was in civil war, he managed to maintain living standards, ensure the payment of officials, the national debt and the return of donors in Côte d'Ivoire. He increased the salaries of law enforcement (to deal with corruption), all without borrowing. In 2005 he "announced a draft fiscal budget of CFAfl,734.97bn, saying the amount would be generated mainly from domestic resources."

In 2004, he and Hubert Oulaye signed Order No. 1437 which stated that all visa applications of contract must be approved by the Minister of Employment. In 2005 he was appointed Minister of Planning and Development, and reappointed in 2007. In 2006, he indicated his intention to take the place of governor of the BCEAO.

Bohoun was to become Governor of the Central Bank of the West African States, to replace Charles Konan Banny, but in January 2008, Laurent Gbagbo and other West African presidents selected Philippe-Henri Dacoury-Tabley. He died in January 2012 in Jerusalem after suffering from kidney problems.
