= Bamba Mamadou =

Ivorian politician

Bamba Mamadou (1952 - 2012) was an Ivorian politician. He served as foreign minister of Côte d'Ivoire from 14 March 2003 to 3 January 2006.
