= Patrick Achi =

Ivorian politician

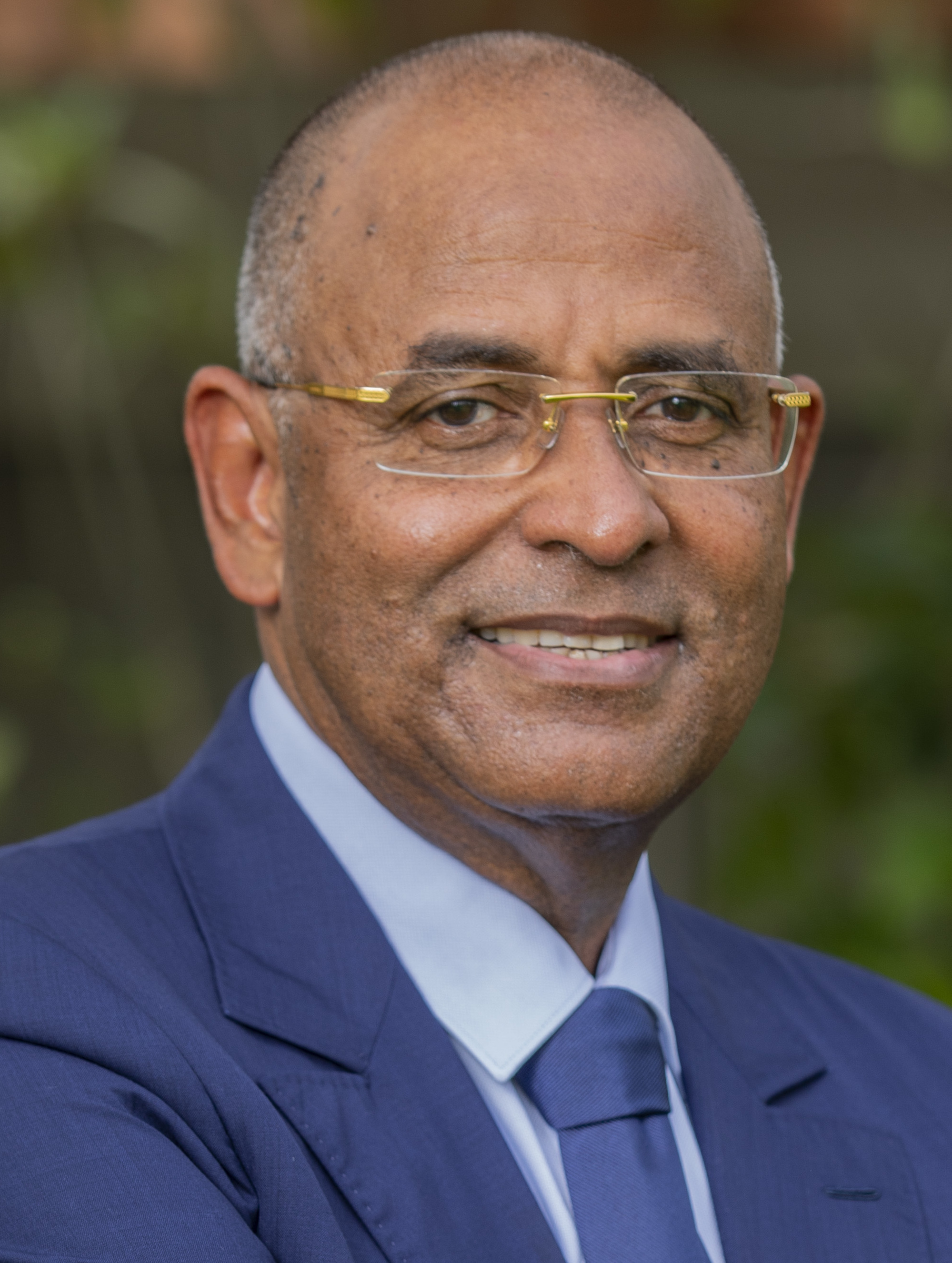
- Achi in 2021

Prime Minister of Côte d'Ivoire
- In office 8 March 2021 – 17 October 2023
- President: Alassane Ouattara
- Preceded by: Hamed Bakayoko
- Succeeded by: Robert Beugré Mambé

Personal details
- Born: 17 November 1955 (age 70) Paris, France
- Party: Rally of the Republicans

Patrick Jérôme Achi (born 17 November 1955) is an Ivorian politician who served as Prime Minister of Côte d'Ivoire from March 2021 to October 2023 in President Alassane Ouattara's government. He is a member of the Rally of the Republicans (RDR). He studied at Supélec and Stanford University and specialises in engineering and infrastructure. He has also worked as the government spokesman for President Alassane Ouattara.

Prior to this he was Secretary General of the Presidency from January 2017, before being promoted to Minister of State, while simultaneously serving as Executive Secretary of the National Council for Economic Policy responsible for the oversight and execution of the 2030 Strategic Plan and the 5-year government program "Côte d'Ivoire Solidaire 2021-2025", a responsibility he retained as prime minister.

On 13 April 2022, PM Achi resigned, along with his government, but was reinstated by President Ouattara before being removed on 6 October 2023 with the dissolution of the Ivorian government. Achi officially resigned for a second time on 18 October 2023.

== Early life and education ==
Achi, born in Paris to an Ivorian father (from the Attié tribe located in the South region) and a French Breton mother. He was educated in France and the United States.

Achi holds a bachelor's degree in physics from the Université de Cocody in Abidjan, a Master of Science degree in Electrical Engineering from École Supérieure d'Électricité de Paris (SUPELEC) and a Master of Science degree in management from Stanford University, California.

== Private sector career ==
In 1983, he began his career as Consultant with Arthur Andersen in their Paris office.

In 1988, he relocated to the Abidjan office as a Director in the Consulting Division for French-speaking West and Central Africa before founding his firm, Strategie & Management Consultants in 1992.

== Political career ==
Between 2010 and 2017, Achi was Minister of Economic Infrastructure for the governments of successive Prime Ministers Guillaume Soro (2010–2012), Jeannot Ahoussou-Kouadio (2012) and Daniel Kablan Duncan (2012–2017).

Achi was appointed acting prime minister on 8 March 2021 to assume the duties of Prime Minister Hamed Bakayoko, who had been hospitalized. Bakayoko died two days later. Achi was appointed as the Prime Minister on 26 March 2021 by President Ouattara. In this capacity, he emerged as a key figure in discussions to resolve a large power generation deficit that had strained electricity supplies in urban areas for several weeks.

On 13 April 2022, he and his government resigned. On 19 April, he was reappointed as prime minister by President Ouattara but with a cabinet reshuffle and the formation of a second government.

Ouattara removed Achi from his position on 6 October 2023 and dissolved his government. Achi officially resigned in 18 October same year.

After leaving government, Achi devoted his time to his role as President of the Regional Council of La Mé. He was appointed President of the Regional Council of La Mé for the first time in 2013.

== International diplomacy and outreach ==
In his capacity as Minister of Economic Infrastructure and later prime minister, Patrick Achi represented Côte d'Ivoire at economic, investment and development focused African and international conferences, round tables and forums. These include:

- Forum Afrique, Paris, France, 10 June 2021: focusing on Côte d'Ivoire's economic resilience during the COVID-19 pandemic and its 2021 economic outlook.
- World Policy Conference, Abu Dhabi, 2–3 October 2021: presented post-COVID challenges for Africa and Côte d'Ivoire and led bi-lateral discussions to strengthen relations with the UAE.
- MEDEF Forum, Paris, France, 19 August 2021: discussions on challenges and opportunities for Côte d'Ivoire.
- Expo 2020, Dubai, UAE, 25 November 2021: presentation of Côte d'Ivoire's successes and opportunities to UAE, Gulf and Asian investors.
- World Economic Forum, Davos, Switzerland, 23–24 May 2022: presented Côte d'Ivoire's National Development Plan 'Vision 2030'.
- 8th TICAD, Tunis, Tunisia, 26–28 August 2022: high-level discussions on Africa's development.
- IMF Annual Meetings, Washington, DC, USA, 10–16 October 2022: Led the Ivorian delegation to the International Monetary Fund (IMF) and World Bank annual meetings. Met with World Bank President David Malpass, who reaffirmed the Bank's support for the country's Vision 2030 development strategy. Mr Achi also had a discussion on global challenges and their impact on Africa with Kristalina Georgieva, managing director of the IMF.
- Accra Initiative Summit, Accra, Ghana, 22 November 2022: African Heads of State summit during which the EU and Gulf of Guinea countries strengthened cooperation in the fight against terrorism and for regional development.
- US-Africa Leaders Summit, Washington, DC, USA, 12–15 December 2022: Hosted by President Joe Biden. Led the country's business roundtable. Met with Meta personnel to discuss digital progress in Côte d'Ivoire.
- Working visit, Paris, France, 21–24 February 2023: Met key political figures including Bruno Le Maire, Minister of the Economy, Finance and Industrial and Digital Sovereignty, to discuss economic cooperation and support for major projects such as the Abidjan Metro and Abidjan airport extension. Met with Prime Minister Elisabeth Borne to discuss Franco-Ivorian friendship and partnerships, youth employment, agriculture, environmental protection and economic investment.
- Africa CEO Forum, Abidjan, Côte d'Ivoire, 5–6 June 2023: opening ceremony speech on the importance of building and identifying African champions.
- Summit for a New Global Financing Pact, Paris, France, 22–23 June 2023: took part in discussions setting the foundations for a new global financing architecture beyond the Bretton Woods system to address climate change, the biodiversity crisis and development challenges.
- Francophonie Games, Kinshasa, RDC, 30 July 2023: supported Côte d'Ivoire's teams and promoted Ivorian culture and sport.

== Other activities ==
- International Monetary Fund (IMF), ex officio Member of the Board of Governors

== Personal life ==
On 16 April 2020, Achi announced that he had tested positive for COVID-19 and was self-isolating until further notice. In May 2021, he was flown to Paris due to "severe fatigue" and for medical checks. He has 5 children. Achi's mother, Marianne Le Du died in France in November 2023.

Political offices
Preceded by Hamed Bakayoko	Prime Minister of the Ivory Coast; 2021–2023	Succeeded by Robert Beugré Mambé
