= List of heads of government of Ivory Coast =

Prime Minister of the Republic of Côte d'Ivoire
- Premier ministre de la République de Côte d'Ivoire (French)
- Coat of arms of Ivory Coast

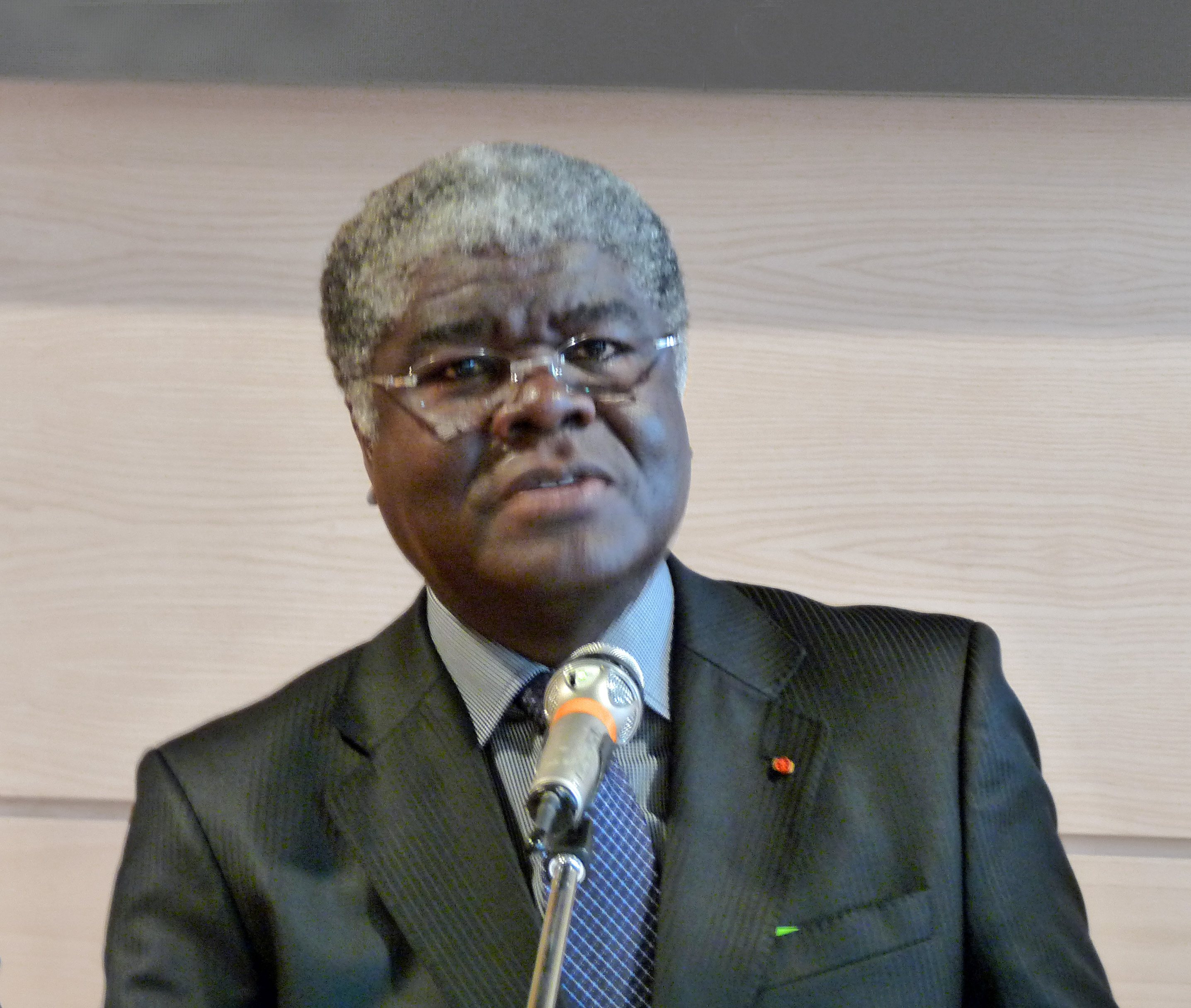
- Incumbent; Robert Beugré Mambé since 17 October 2023
- Type: Head of government
- Member of: Government
- Appointer: President of the Ivory Coast
- Formation: 7 August 1960; 66 years ago
- First holder: Félix Houphouët-Boigny
- Deputy: Deputy/Vice-Prime Minister of Ivory Coast
- Website: www.premierministre.ci (in French)

This article lists the heads of government of Ivory Coast, officially the Republic of Côte d'Ivoire, since the country gained independence from France in 1960. The current prime minister is Robert Beugré Mambé since 17 October 2023. He assumed office after former Prime Minister Patrick Achi was removed from his position on 6 October 2023 when President Alassane Ouattara called for a government reshuffle.

== List of officeholders ==
Political parties

Democratic Party of Ivory Coast – African Democratic Rally (PDCI–RDA)
Ivorian Popular Front (FPI)
Patriotic Movement of Ivory Coast (MPCI)
Rally of the Republicans (RDR)

Coalition

Rally of Houphouëtists for Democracy and Peace (RHDP)

Other factions

Independent

No.	Portrait	Name (Birth–Death)	Term of office			Political party (Coalition)	Elected	Cabinet(s)	President	Ref.
No.	Portrait	Name (Birth–Death)	Took office	Left office	Time in office	Political party (Coalition)	Elected	Cabinet(s)	President	Ref.
1		Félix Houphouët-Boigny (1905–1993)	7 August 1960	27 November 1960	112 days	PDCI–RDA	1960	Houphouët-Boigny	Himself	
Post abolished (27 November 1960 – 7 November 1990)
2		Alassane Ouattara (born 1942)	7 November 1990	11 December 1993	3 years, 34 days	PDCI–RDA	1990	Ouattara	Félix Houphouët-Boigny	
3		Daniel Kablan Duncan (born 1943)	11 December 1993	24 December 1999 (Deposed in a coup)	6 years, 13 days	PDCI–RDA	–	Duncan I	Henri Konan Bédié	
3		Daniel Kablan Duncan (born 1943)	11 December 1993	24 December 1999 (Deposed in a coup)	6 years, 13 days	PDCI–RDA	–	Duncan II	Henri Konan Bédié	
3		Daniel Kablan Duncan (born 1943)	11 December 1993	24 December 1999 (Deposed in a coup)	6 years, 13 days	PDCI–RDA	1995	Duncan II	Henri Konan Bédié	
3		Daniel Kablan Duncan (born 1943)	11 December 1993	24 December 1999 (Deposed in a coup)	6 years, 13 days	PDCI–RDA	–	Duncan III	Henri Konan Bédié	
Vacant (24 December 1999 – 18 May 2000)
4		Seydou Diarra (1933–2020)	18 May 2000	27 October 2000	162 days	Independent	–	Diarra I	Robert Guéï	
5		Pascal Affi N'Guessan (born 1953)	27 October 2000	10 February 2003	2 years, 106 days	FPI	–	Duncan I	Laurent Gbagbo	
5		Pascal Affi N'Guessan (born 1953)	27 October 2000	10 February 2003	2 years, 106 days	FPI	2000–2001	Duncan II	Laurent Gbagbo	
5		Pascal Affi N'Guessan (born 1953)	27 October 2000	10 February 2003	2 years, 106 days	FPI	–	Duncan III	Laurent Gbagbo	
5		Pascal Affi N'Guessan (born 1953)	27 October 2000	10 February 2003	2 years, 106 days	FPI	–	Duncan IV	Laurent Gbagbo	
(4)		Seydou Diarra (1933–2020)	10 February 2003	7 December 2005	2 years, 300 days	Independent	–	Diarra II	Laurent Gbagbo	
6		Charles Konan Banny (1942–2021)	7 December 2005	4 April 2007	1 year, 116 days	Independent	–	Banny I	Laurent Gbagbo	
6		Charles Konan Banny (1942–2021)	7 December 2005	4 April 2007	1 year, 116 days	Independent	–	Banny II	Laurent Gbagbo	
7		Guillaume Soro (born 1972) (Note: Co-claimant under Ouattara from 6 December 2010 to 11 April 2011.)	4 April 2007	13 March 2012	4 years, 346 days	MPCI (FNCI)	–	Soro I	Alassane Ouattara	
7		Guillaume Soro (born 1972)	4 April 2007	13 March 2012	4 years, 346 days	MPCI (FNCI)	–	Soro II	Alassane Ouattara	
8		Gilbert Aké (born 1956) (Note: Co-claimant under Gbagbo.)	6 December 2010	11 April 2011 (Deposed in a civil war)	126 days	FPI	–	Aké	Laurent Gbagbo	
9		Jeannot Ahoussou-Kouadio (born 1951)	13 March 2012	21 November 2012	253 days	PDCI–RDA	2011	Ahoussou-Kouadio	Alassane Ouattara	
(3)		Daniel Kablan Duncan (born 1943)	21 November 2012	10 January 2017	4 years, 50 days	PDCI–RDA	–	Duncan IV	Alassane Ouattara	
10		Amadou Gon Coulibaly (1959–2020)	10 January 2017	8 July 2020 #	3 years, 180 days	RDR (RHDP)	2016	Coulibaly I	Alassane Ouattara	
10		Amadou Gon Coulibaly (1959–2020)	10 January 2017	8 July 2020 #	3 years, 180 days	RDR (RHDP)	–	Coulibaly II	Alassane Ouattara	
10		Amadou Gon Coulibaly (1959–2020)	10 January 2017	8 July 2020 #	3 years, 180 days	RDR (RHDP)	–	Coulibaly III	Alassane Ouattara	
11		Hamed Bakayoko (1965–2021)	8 July 2020	8 March 2021 #	243 days	RDR (RHDP)	–	Coulibaly III	Alassane Ouattara	
12		Patrick Achi (born 1955)	8 March 2021	17 October 2023	2 years, 223 days	RDR (RHDP)	2021	Achi I	Alassane Ouattara	
12		Patrick Achi (born 1955)	8 March 2021	17 October 2023	2 years, 223 days	RDR (RHDP)	–	Achi II	Alassane Ouattara	
13		Robert Beugré Mambé (born 1952)	17 October 2023	Incumbent	2 years, 325 days	RDR (RHDP)	–	Mambé I	Alassane Ouattara	
13		Robert Beugré Mambé (born 1952)	17 October 2023	Incumbent	2 years, 325 days	RDR (RHDP)	2025	Mambé II	Alassane Ouattara	

== See also ==
- Politics of Ivory Coast
- List of heads of state of Ivory Coast
- List of colonial governors of Ivory Coast

== Sources ==
- Guinness Book of Kings Rulers & Statesmen, Clive Carpenter, Guinness Superlatives Ltd.
