= Amadou Koné (politician) =

Ivorian politician

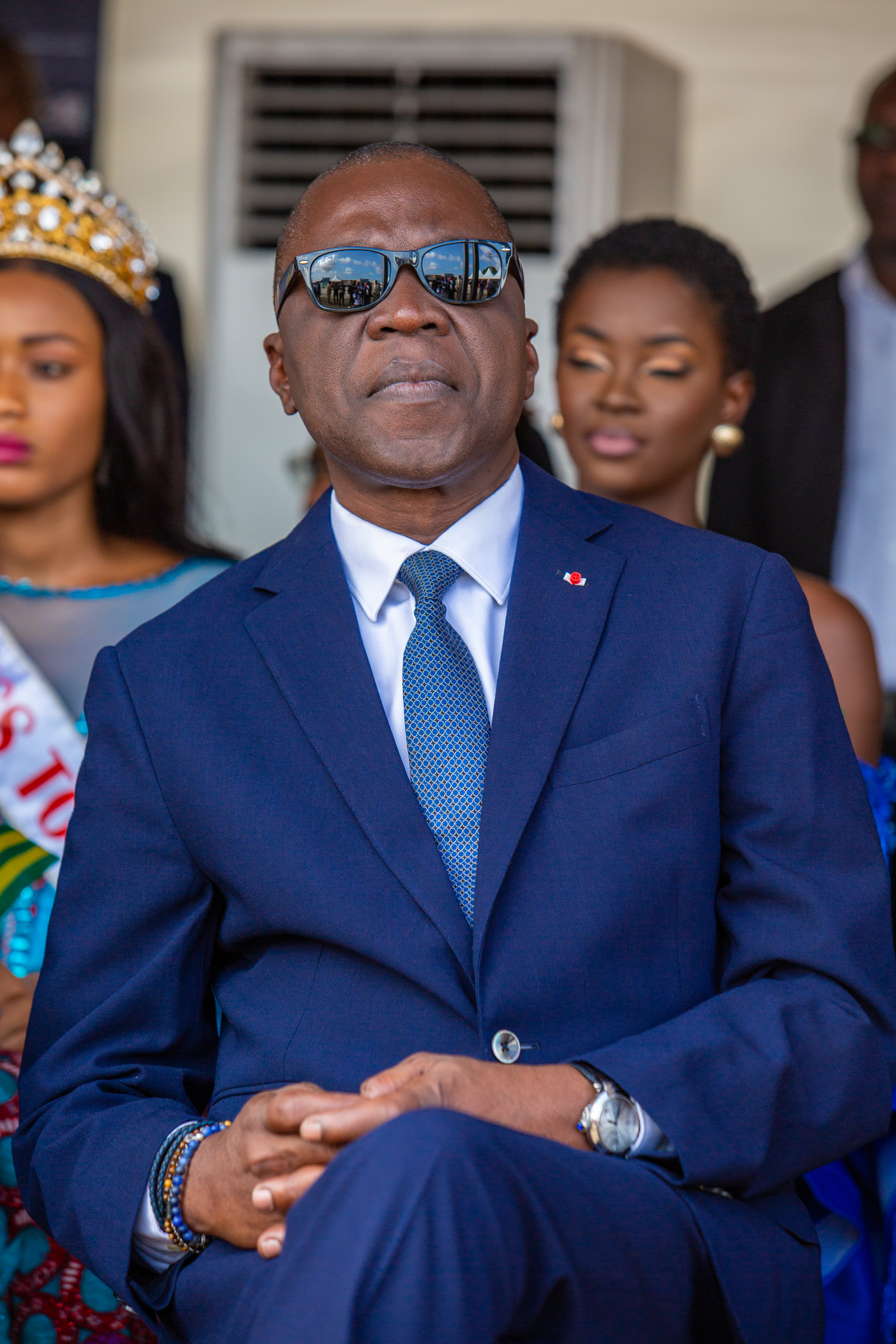
Amadou Koné

Amadou Koné (born 24 August 1966) is an Ivorian politician from Rally of the Republicans who served as Minister of Transport in the Achi II government.
