= Simeon Aké =

Ivorian politician (1932–2003)

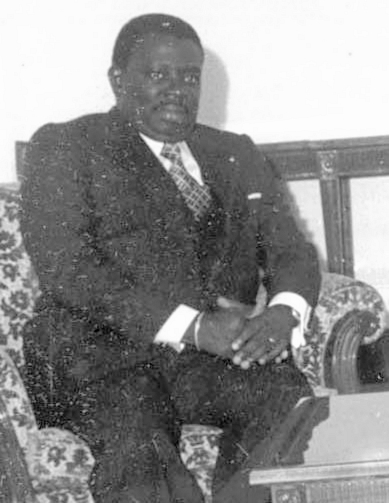
Simeon Aké in 1978

Simeon Aké (4 January 1932 in Bingerville – 8 January 2003 in Abidjan) was an Ivorian politician.

Simeon Aké studied law in the University of Dakar in Senegal, and gained his certificate in 1957. Aké began his political career as Director of Protocol of State in from 1959 until 1960, when Côte d'Ivoire gained independence. He served as a diplomat in its embassy in New York City in 1961–63, and then as ambassador in London, 1964–66, with responsibility for Great Britain and Northern Ireland, Denmark, Sweden and Norway. In 1966 he was appointed ambassador of Côte d'Ivoire to the United Nations. He headed, in this capacity, the UN visiting mission to Spanish Sahara in 1975. From 1977 to 1990, he served as Foreign Minister of Côte d'Ivoire, under President Félix Houphouët-Boigny. He was a member of the Directing Committee and Political Bureau of the Parti Démocratique de Côte d'Ivoire (PDCI).

== Honors and awards ==
- Grand Officer of the Order of the Legion of Honour
- Commander of the National Order of the Ivory Coast
