= Amadou Gon Coulibaly =

Prime Minister of the Ivory Coast (2017–2020)

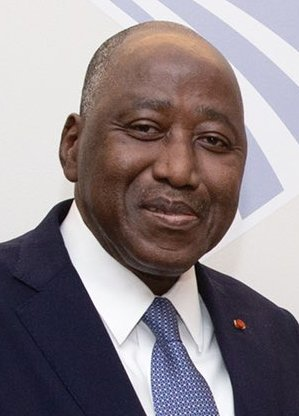
- Coulibaly in 2019

10th Prime Minister of the Ivory Coast
- In office 10 January 2017 – 8 July 2020
- President: Alassane Ouattara
- Preceded by: Daniel Kablan Duncan
- Succeeded by: Hamed Bakayoko

Personal details
- Born: 10 February 1959; Abidjan, French West Africa (now Ivory Coast)
- Died: 8 July 2020 (aged 61); Abidjan, Ivory Coast
- Political party: Rally of the Republicans

Amadou Gon Coulibaly (10 February 1959 – 8 July 2020) was an Ivorian politician who served as Prime Minister of Côte d'Ivoire from January 2017 until his death in July 2020. He was the ruling party's candidate in the 2020 Ivorian presidential election and had been among the favourites to win. He had earlier served as the presidency's secretary general under President Alassane Ouattara from 2011 to 2017.

== Career ==
In the early 1990s, Amadou Gon Coulibaly worked as a technical adviser to Prime Minister Alassane Ouattara. Coulibaly was a member of the National Assembly from 1995 to 1999, and then from 2011 until his death. He also served as Mayor of Korhogo.

Coulibaly was minister of agriculture from October 2002 to February 2010. After Alassane Ouattara became president, Coulibaly served as secretary general of the presidency from 2011 to January 2017.

President Ouattara appointed Coulibaly as prime minister on 10 January 2017. The composition of his new government was announced on 11 January. It was considered broadly similar to the previous government under Daniel Kablan Duncan, with most of the key ministers retaining their posts. With 28 ministers, it was smaller than the previous government, which had 35. Coulibaly was additionally assigned responsibility for the ministerial portfolio of the budget on 19 July 2017.

At the RDR's Third Ordinary Congress in September 2017, Coulibaly was designated as First Vice-President of the Rally of the Republicans (RDR), the ruling party. When Ouattara dissolved the government amid tensions within the governing coalition in July 2018, Coulibaly was re-appointed to form a new government.

== Health and death ==
Coulibaly underwent heart surgery in 2012. He went to France on 2 May 2020, for a heart exam and rest, then returned to Ivory Coast on 2 July. On 8 July, he became unwell during a weekly cabinet meeting and was taken to a hospital where he died. He was 61 years old.

== Other activities ==
From 2017, Coulibaly was an ex officio member of the board of governors of the International Monetary Fund, the Multilateral Investment Guarantee Agency, part of the World Bank Group, and the World Bank.

Political offices
Preceded by Daniel Kablan Duncan	Prime Minister of the Ivory Coast; 2017–2020	Succeeded by Hamed Bakayoko
