= Charles Koffi Diby =

Ivorian politician (1957–2019)

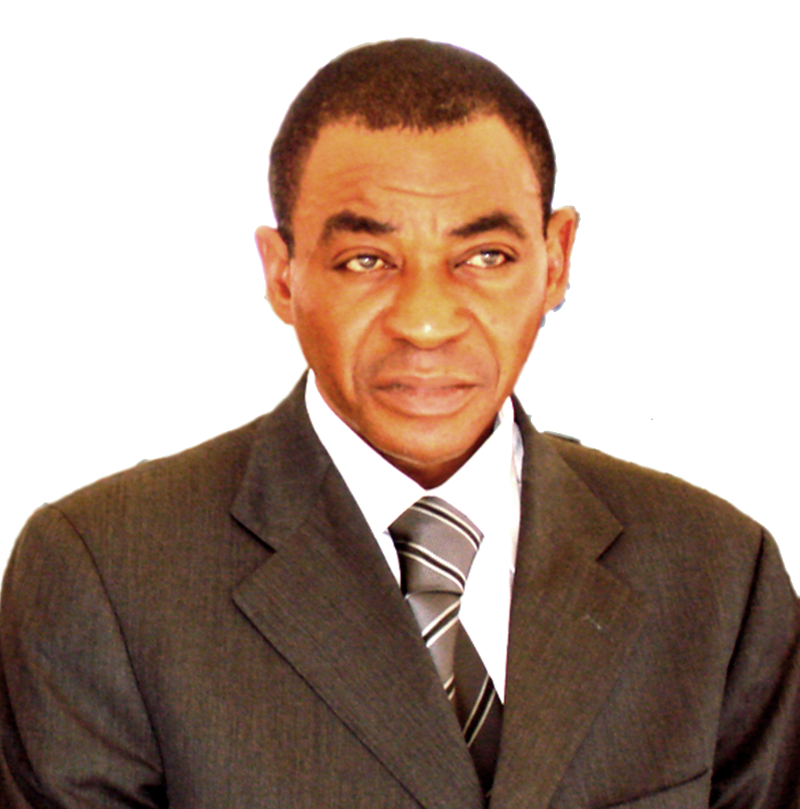
- Born: September 7, 1957; Bouake, Côte d'Ivoire
- Died: December 7, 2019 (aged 62); Abidjan, Côte d'Ivoire

Charles Koffi Diby (7 September 1957 – 7 December 2019) was a politician from Ivory Coast. He was the Minister of Economy and Finance from April 2007 to November 2012. Then he served as the Minister of Foreign Affairs of the Ivory Coast from 2012 to 2016. He died on 7 December 2019, aged 62.

== Sources ==
- article on Diby's visit to Brazil
