= Daniel Kablan Duncan =

1st Vice President of Ivory Coast and 3rd Prime Minister of Ivory Coast

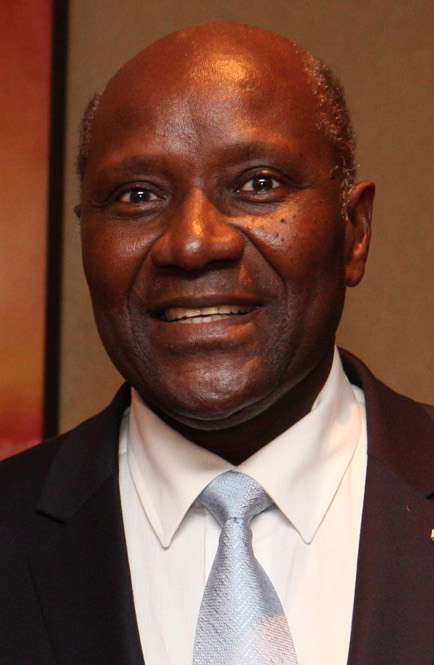

1st Vice President of Ivory Coast
- In office 16 January 2017 – 13 July 2020
- President: Alassane Ouattara
- Preceded by: Position established
- Succeeded by: Tiémoko Meyliet Koné

3rd Prime Minister of Ivory Coast
- In office 21 November 2012 – 9 January 2017
- President: Alassane Ouattara
- Preceded by: Jeannot Ahoussou-Kouadio
- Succeeded by: Amadou Gon Coulibaly
- In office 11 December 1993 – 24 December 1999
- President: Henri Konan Bédié
- Preceded by: Alassane Ouattara
- Succeeded by: Seydou Diarra

Personal details
- Born: 30 June 1943 (age 83) Ouellé, French West Africa (now Ouellé, Ivory Coast)
- Party: Democratic

Daniel Kablan Duncan (born 30 June 1943) is an Ivorian politician. He previously served as Prime Minister of Ivory Coast from 11 December 1993 to 24 December 1999 and again from November 2012 to January 2017. He was Minister of Foreign Affairs from June 2011 to November 2012. He was also the first Vice President of Ivory Coast, after the recreation of this office, from January 2017 until 13 July 2020.

== Life and career ==
Duncan was born at Ouelle on 30 June 1943. He completed his secondary and tertiary studies in France. He went to Lycée Montaigne in Bordeaux. He studied at the École des Hautes Etudes Commerciales in Lille and the École Supérieure de Commerce back in Bordeaux. He got a degree in business engineering from the Commercial Institute of Nancy.

In 1970 Duncan returned to Ivory Coast and began work as a civil servant in the Ivorian Ministry of Economy and Finance. a few years later he worked for a time with the International Monetary Fund and then the Central Bank of West African States. He remained in this position until 1990 when he entered politics.

Duncan served as Minister of Economy and Finance under Prime Minister Alassane Ouattara from November 1990 to December 1993. Following the death of President Félix Houphouët-Boigny on 7 December 1993, Ouattara lost a power struggle with Henri Konan Bédié for the presidency; Ouattara resigned and Duncan was appointed to succeed him as prime minister. He remained in charge of finance when he became prime minister. He said that he would continue Ouattara's economic policies of austerity and privatization.

Duncan served as prime minister for six years, until President Henri Konan Bédié was ousted in a military coup on 24 December 1999. At the time of the coup he fled to France but returned to Ivory Coast about a year later.

Duncan was named Minister of Foreign Affairs by President Alassane Ouattara on 1 June 2011. After more than a year in that post, he was appointed to replace Jeannot Ahoussou-Kouadio as prime minister on 21 November 2012. Like Ahoussou-Kouadio, Duncan is a member of the Democratic Party of Côte d'Ivoire (PDCI), a party headed by Bédié and allied with President Ouattara's party, the Rally of the Republicans (RDR). The composition of his government was announced on 22 November 2012. Duncan, in addition to serving as prime minister, was also assigned the ministerial portfolio for finance and the economy. Meanwhile, Charles Koffi Diby, who had been Minister of Finance in the previous government, replaced Duncan as Minister of Foreign Affairs.

After Alassane Ouattara won re-election in October 2015, Duncan and his government resigned on 6 January 2016, but Ouattara immediately reappointed Duncan as prime minister.

In the December 2016 parliamentary election, Duncan was elected to the National Assembly as a candidate of the RHDP ruling coalition in Grand-Bassam, receiving 87.46% of the vote. Following the election, Duncan submitted his pro forma resignation as prime minister on 9 January 2017.

== Vice President of Ivory Coast ==
Ouattara then appointed Duncan as the Vice-President of Ivory Coast, a post created by the 2016 constitution, on 10 January; he also appointed Amadou Gon Coulibaly to succeed Duncan as prime minister on the same day. Duncan was officially sworn in on 16 January 2017.

On July 13, 2020, his resignation was submitted to the Presiden of the Republic on February 27, 2020, and took effect on july 8.

Political offices
Preceded by Alassane Ouattara	Prime Minister of the Ivory Coast; 1993–1999	Succeeded by Seydou Diarra
Preceded by Jeannot Ahoussou-Kouadio	Prime Minister of the Ivory Coast; 2012–2017	Succeeded by Amadou Gon Coulibaly
New office	Vice President of Ivory Coast; Interim; 2017–2020	Vacant
