= Alassane Ouattara =

President of Ivory Coast since 2010

Alassane Ouattara GColIH
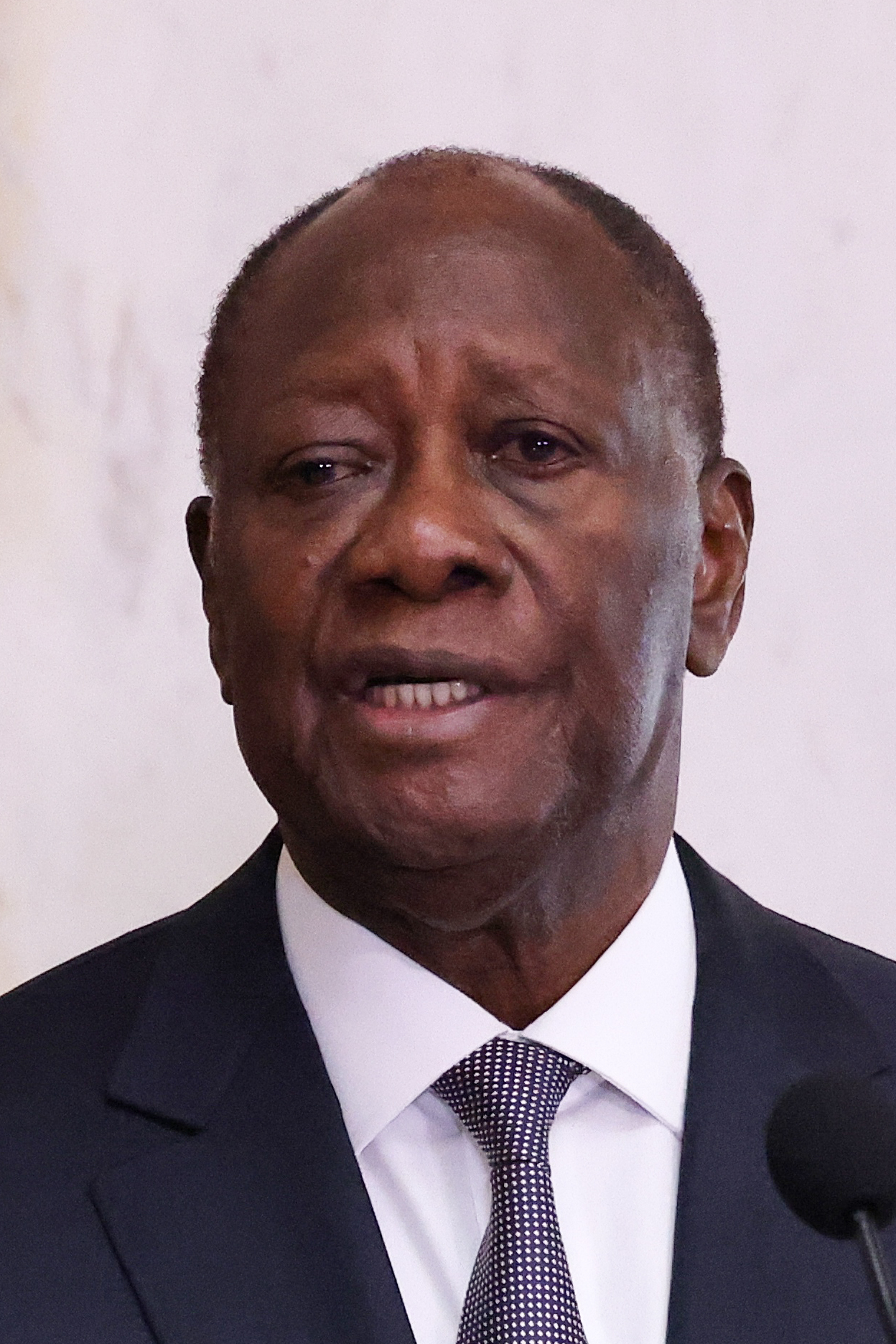
- Ouattara in 2024

5th President of Ivory Coast
- Incumbent
- Assumed office 11 April 2011 (Note: Disputed with Laurent Gbagbo from 4 December 2010 to 11 April 2011.)
- Prime Minister: Guillaume Soro; Jeannot Ahoussou-Kouadio; Daniel Kablan Duncan; Amadou Gon Coulibaly; Hamed Bakayoko; Patrick Achi; Robert Beugré Mambé
- Vice President: Daniel Kablan Duncan; Tiémoko Meyliet Koné
- Vice PM: Téné Birahima Ouattara
- Preceded by: Laurent Gbagbo

2nd Prime Minister of the Ivory Coast
- In office 7 November 1990 – 9 December 1993
- President: Félix Houphouët-Boigny
- Preceded by: Félix Houphouët-Boigny
- Succeeded by: Daniel Kablan Duncan

24th Minister of the Economy and Finance
- In office October 1990 – November 1993

30th Deputy Director General of the International Monetary Fund
- In office 1994–1999

25th Governor of the Central Bank of West African States
- In office December 1988 – November 1990
- Preceded by: Abdoulaye Fadiga
- Succeeded by: Charles Konan Banny

Personal details
- Born: 1 January 1942 (age 84) Dimbokro, Ivory Coast
- Party: Democratic Party (Before 1994); Rally of the Republicans (1994–present)
- Spouses: Barbara Jean Davis (m. 1966, divorced) Dominique Nouvian (m. 1991)
- Children: 2
- Relatives: Téné Birahima Ouattara (brother)
- Education: Drexel University (BS); University of Pennsylvania (MA, PhD)
- Website: Official presidential website

Alassane Dramane Ouattara (US; French pronunciation: [alasan wataʁa]; born 1 January 1942) is an Ivorian politician and economist who has been President of Ivory Coast (Côte d'Ivoire) since 2010. An economist by profession, he worked for the International Monetary Fund (IMF) and the Central Bank of West African States (French: Banque Centrale des Etats de l'Afrique de l'Ouest, BCEAO), and was the Prime Minister of Côte d'Ivoire from November 1990 to December 1993, appointed to that post by then-President Félix Houphouët-Boigny. Ouattara became the president of the Rally of the Republicans (RDR), an Ivorian political party, in 1999.

== Early and personal life ==
Ouattara was born on 1 January 1942, in Dimbokro in Cote d’Ivoire He is a descendant on his father's side from Sekou Ouattara and the Muslim rulers of the Kong Empire—also known as the Wattara (Ouattarra) Empire. Ouattara is Muslim and is a member of the Dyula people. He received a B.Sc. in Business Administration in 1965 from the Drexel Institute of Technology (now Drexel University), in Philadelphia, Pennsylvania. Ouattara then obtained both his M.A. in economics in 1967 and a Ph.D. in economics in 1972 from the University of Pennsylvania.

Ouattara has two children, David Dramane Ouattara and Fanta Catherine Ouattara, from his first marriage to American Barbara Jean Davis. In 1991, Ouattara married Dominique Nouvian, a French Algerian-born Catholic businesswoman of maternal Jewish descent. Their wedding was held in the town hall of the 16th arrondissement of Paris.

== Career at financial institutions ==
Ouattara was an economist for the International Monetary Fund in Washington, D.C. from 1968 to 1973, and afterwards he was the Chargé de Mission in Paris of the Banque Centrale des Etats de l’Afrique de l’Ouest (West African Central Bank) from 1973 to 1975. With the BCEAO, he was then Special Advisor to the Governor and Director of Research from February 1975 to December 1982 and Vice Governor from January 1983 to October 1984. From November 1984 to October 1988 he was Director of the African Department at the IMF, and in May 1987 he additionally became Counsellor to the Managing Director at the IMF. On 28 October 1988 he was appointed as Governor of the BCEAO, and he was sworn in on 22 December 1988. Ouattara has a reputation as a hard worker, keen on transparency and good governance.

== Political career ==
=== Prime minister ===
In April 1990, the IMF under the Structural Adjustment Program forced the Ivorian president, Félix Houphouët-Boigny, to accept Ouattara as Chairman of the Inter-ministerial Committee for Coordination of the Stabilization and Economic Recovery Programme of Côte d'Ivoire. While holding that position, Ouattara also remained in his post as BCEAO Governor. He subsequently became Prime Minister of Côte d'Ivoire on 7 November 1990, still under the IMF imposition, after which Charles Konan Banny replaced him as Interim BCEAO Governor. He also held the position of Minister of Economy and Finance from October 1990 to November 1993.

While serving as prime minister, Ouattara also tried, illegally and against the constitution, to carry out presidential duties for a total of 18 months, including the period from March to December 1993, when Houphouët-Boigny was ill. Houphouët-Boigny died on 7 December 1993, and Ouattara announced his death to the nation, saying that "Côte d'Ivoire is orphaned". A brief power struggle ensued between Ouattara and Henri Konan Bédié, the president of the National Assembly, over the presidential succession in total disregard for the constitution that clearly gave Bedié the legal right to lead the country if Houphouet became unfit. Bédié prevailed and Ouattara resigned as prime minister on 9 December. Ouattara then returned to the IMF as Deputy Managing Director, holding that post from 1 July 1994 to 31 July 1999.

=== 1995 election ===
Prior to the October 1995 presidential election, the National Assembly of Côte d'Ivoire approved an electoral code that barred candidates if either of their parents were of a foreign nationality and if they had not lived in Côte d'Ivoire for the preceding five years. It was widely thought these provisions were aimed at Ouattara. Owing to his duties with the IMF, he had not resided in the country since 1990. Also, his father was born in Burkina Faso. The Rally of the Republicans (RDR), an opposition party formed as a split from the ruling Democratic Party of Côte d'Ivoire (PDCI) in 1994, sought for Ouattara to be its presidential candidate. In late June 1995, RDR Secretary-General Djéni Kobina met with Ouattara, at which time, according to Kobina, Ouattara said: "I'm ready to join you." The party nominated Ouattara as its presidential candidate on 3 July 1995 at its first ordinary congress. The government would not change the electoral code, however, and Ouattara declined the nomination. The RDR boycotted the election, along with the Ivorian Popular Front (FPI) of Laurent Gbagbo, leaving the PDCI's candidate, incumbent president Henri Konan Bédié, to win an easy victory.

=== President of the RDR ===
While serving as Deputy Managing Director at the IMF, in March 1998, Ouattara expressed his intention to return to Côte d'Ivoire and take part in politics again. After leaving the IMF in July 1999, he was elected President of the RDR on 1 August 1999 at an extraordinary congress of the party, as well as being chosen as its candidate for the next presidential election. He said he was eligible to stand in the election, pointing to documents he said demonstrated that he and his parents were of Ivorian birth.

He was accused of forging these papers, prompting investigations. President Bédié described Ouattara as a Burkinabé and said that Houphouët-Boigny "wanted Alassane Ouattara to concern himself only with the economy". Ouattara's nationality certificate, issued in late September 1999, was annulled by a court on 27 October. An arrest warrant for Ouattara was issued on 29 November, although he was out of the country at the time; he nevertheless said that he would return by late December.

On 24 December, the military seized power, ousting Bédié. Ouattara returned to Côte d'Ivoire after three months in France on 29 December, hailing Bédié's ouster as "not a coup d'état", but "a revolution supported by all the Ivorian people".

A new constitution, approved by referendum in July 2000, controversially barred presidential candidates unless both of their parents were Ivorians, and Ouattara was disqualified from the 2000 presidential election. The issues surrounding this were major factors in the First Ivorian Civil War, which broke out in 2002.

When asked in an interview about Ouattara's nationality, Burkinabé President Blaise Compaoré responded, "For us, things are simple: he does not come from Burkina Faso, neither by birth, marriage, or naturalization. This man has been Prime Minister of Côte d'Ivoire."

President Gbagbo affirmed on 6 August 2007 that Ouattara could stand in the next Ivorian presidential election. Ouattara was designated as the RDR's presidential candidate at its Second Ordinary Congress on 1–3 February 2008; he was also re-elected as President of the RDR for another five years. At the congress, he invited the former rebel New Forces, from whom he had previously distanced himself, to team up with the RDR for the election.

At the time, Ouattara said publicly that he did not believe Gbagbo would organize transparent and fair elections.

The RDR and the PDCI are both members of the Rally of Houphouëtistes, and while Ouattara and Bédié ran separately in the first round, each agreed to support the other if only one of them made it into a potential second round.

=== Presidency ===
==== 2010 presidential election and aftermath ====
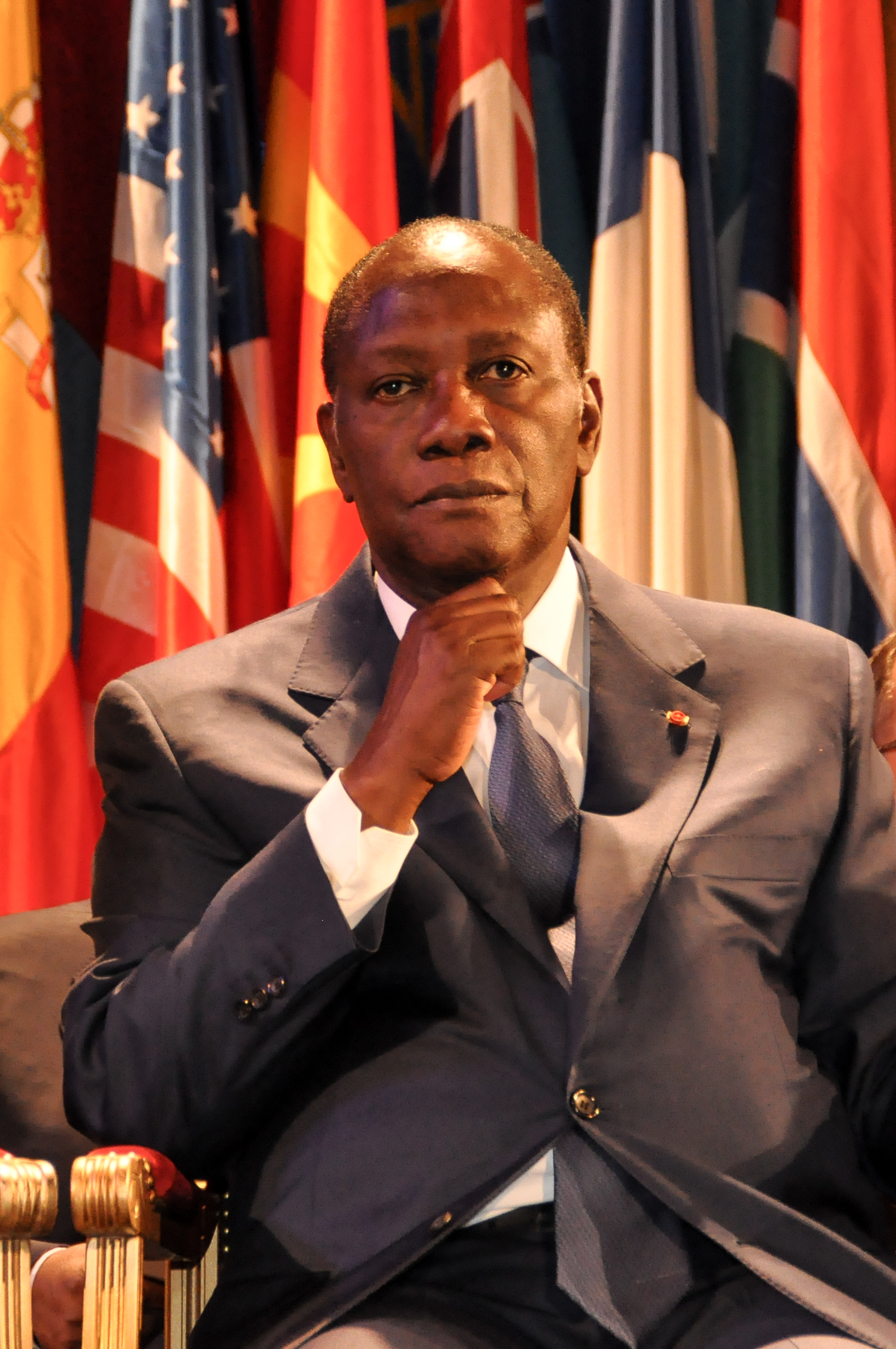
Ouattara at UNESCO in September 2011

The presidential elections that should have been organized in 2005 were postponed until November 2010. The preliminary results announced independently by the president of the Electoral Commission from the headquarters of Ouattara due to concern about fraud in that commission. They showed a loss for Gbagbo in favour of former prime minister Alassane Ouattara.

The ruling FPI contested the results before the Constitutional Council, charging massive fraud in the northern departments controlled by the rebels of the New Forces. These charges were contradicted by United Nations observers (unlike African Union observers). The report of the results led to severe tension and violent incidents. The Constitutional Council, which consisted of Gbagbo supporters, declared the results of seven northern departments unlawful and that Gbagbo had won the elections with 51% of the vote – instead of Ouattara winning with 54%, as reported by the Electoral Commission. After the inauguration of Gbagbo, Ouattara—who was recognized as the winner by most countries and the United Nations—organized an alternative inauguration. These events raised fears of a resurgence of the civil war; thousands of refugees fled the country.

The African Union sent Thabo Mbeki, former president of South Africa, to mediate the conflict. The United Nations Security Council adopted a resolution recognising Alassane Ouattara as winner of the elections, based on the position of the Economic Community of West African States, which suspended Ivory Coast from all its decision-making bodies while the African Union also suspended the country's membership.

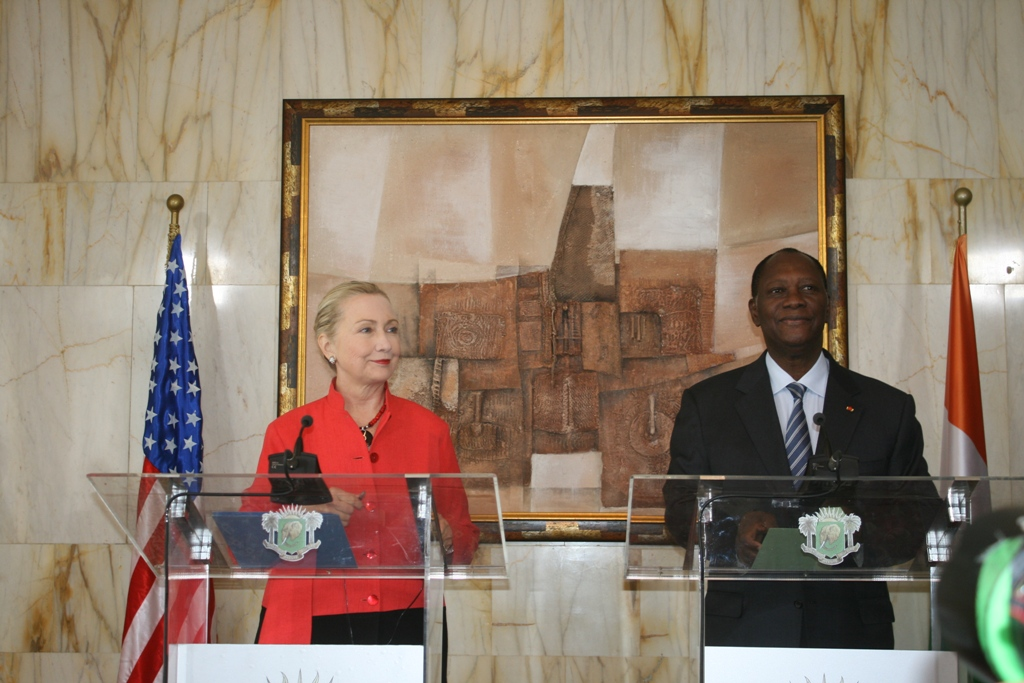
Hillary Clinton and Ouattara respond to questions from reporters during their joint press conference at the Presidential Palace in Abidjan, 2012

In 2010, a colonel of the Ivory Coast armed forces, Nguessan Yao, was arrested in New York in a year-long U.S. Immigration and Customs Enforcement operation charged with procuring and illegal export of weapons and munitions: 4,000 9 mm handguns, 200,000 rounds of ammunition, and 50,000 tear-gas grenades, in violation of a UN embargo. Several other Ivory Coast officers were released because they had diplomatic passports. His accomplice, Michael Barry Shor, an international trader, was located in Virginia.

The 2010 presidential election led to the 2010–2011 Ivorian crisis and the Second Ivorian Civil War. International organizations reported numerous human-rights violations by both sides. In the city of Duékoué, hundreds of people were killed. In nearby Bloléquin, dozens were killed. UN and French forces took military action against Gbagbo. Gbagbo was taken into custody after a raid into his residence on 11 April 2011. The country was severely damaged by the war, and observers say it will be a challenge for Ouattara to rebuild the economy and reunite Ivorians.

The developments in the country were welcomed by world leaders. U.S. President Barack Obama applauded news of the developments in Côte d'Ivoire, and CNN quoted U.S. Secretary of State Hillary Clinton as saying Gbagbo's capture "sends a strong signal to dictators and tyrants.... They may not disregard the voice of their own people".

===== 2012 marriage law row =====
In a controversial move in November 2012, President Ouattara sacked his government in a row over a new marriage law that would make wives joint heads of the household. His own party supported the changes, but the elements of the ruling coalition resisted, with the strongest opposition coming from the Democratic Party of Côte d'Ivoire.

=== Second and third term, 2015–2020 ===
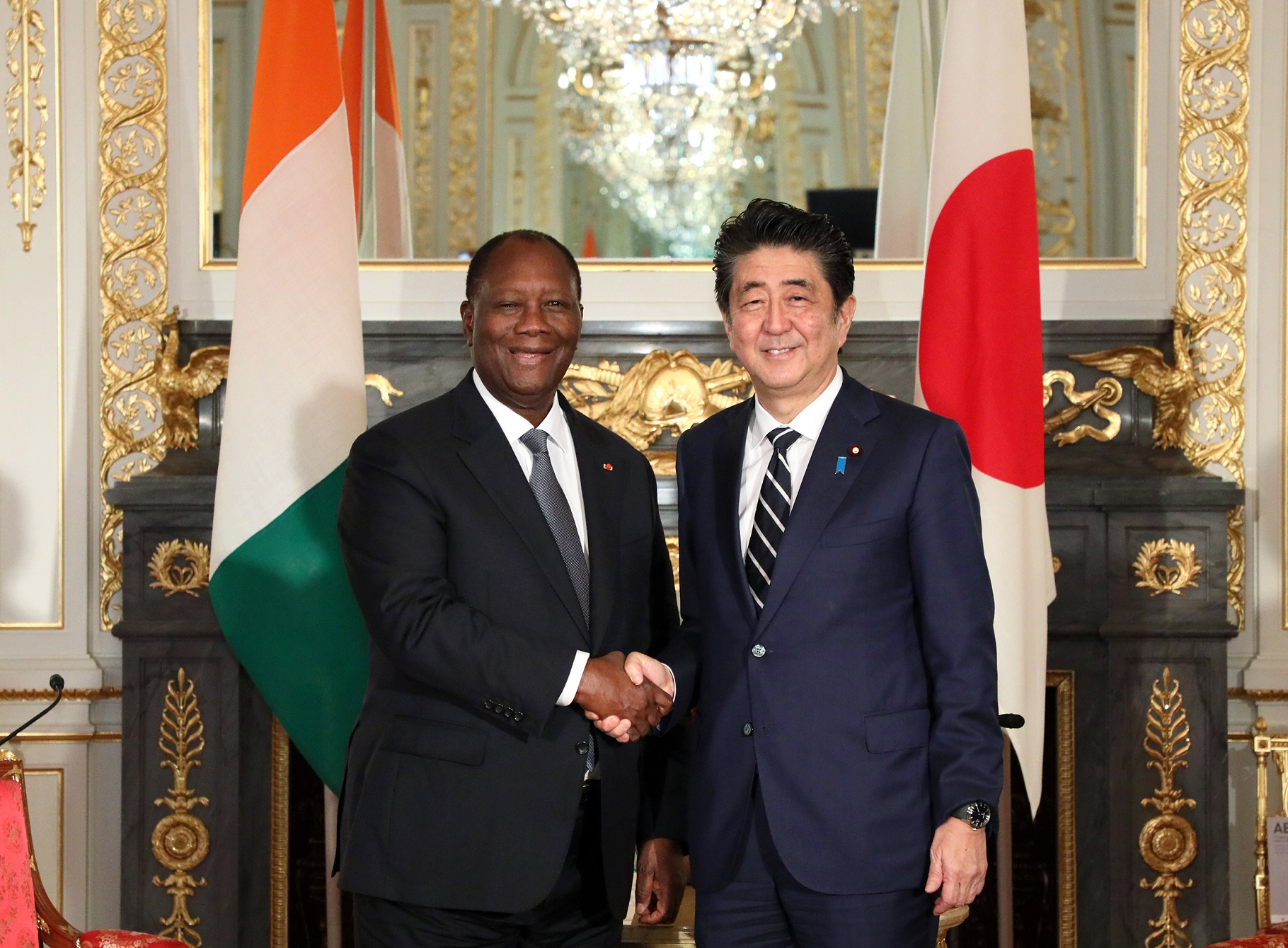
Shinzo Abe with Alassane Ouattara at the Guest House Akasaka Palace in 2019

Ouattara won a second five-year term in 2015 with almost 84% of the vote. With 2,118,229 votes, or 83.66% of votes cast, and a 54.63% turnout, his victory was a landslide compared to the 50% required to avoid a run-off and the 9% of his closest rival, FPI leader Pascal Affi N'Guessan.

At the RDR's Third Ordinary Congress on 9–10 September 2017, it was expected that Ouattara would be elected as President of the RDR, but he instead proposed Henriette Diabaté for the post, and she was duly elected by acclamation.

In March 2020, Ouattara announced he would not run again in the presidential elections of 31 October 2020, and supported Prime Minister Amadou Gon Coulibaly as the presidential candidate of the RDR. After the sudden death of Coulibaly on 8 July 2020, Ouattara considered putting forward Defense Minister Hamed Bakayoko, before changing his mind due to alleged links to drug trafficking. In July, he announced a run for a third term in office. His candidacy was controversial, for the Ivorian constitution permits only two presidential terms. The Constitutional Court ruled that the first term under a different constitution did not count for the purposes of the two-term rule of the current constitution, thus allowing Ouattara's candidacy; this led to violent protests in Abidjan and throughout the country. The election of October 2020 was thus boycotted by a large part of the opposition, and saw the reelection of Ouattara with 95.31% of the votes under a 53.90% turnout.

=== Fourth term, 2025-present ===
In June 2025, Ouattara was again nominated by his party to run for reelection in the 2025 Ivorian presidential election. He confirmed his candidacy on 29 July. He was reelected on 25 October with 89.77% of the vote and was inaugurated on 8 December.

== Honours ==
=== National ===
- Grand Collar of the National Order of the Ivory Coast (4 December 2010)

=== Foreign honours ===
- Benin:
  - Grand Cross of the National Order of Benin (9 March 2013)
- Burkina Faso:
  - Grand Cross of the Ordre de l'Étalon, formerly National Order of Burkina Faso (31 July 2019)
- Ghana:
  - Companion of the Order of the Star of Ghana (16 October 2017)
- Mali:
  - Grand Cross of the National Order of Mali (3 September 2013)
- Niger:
  - Grand Cross of the National Order of Niger
- Lebanon:
  - Member Extraordinary Grade of the Order of Merit of Lebanon (14 March 2013)
- Liberia:
  - Grand Cordon of the Order of the Pioneers of Liberia
- Portugal:
  - Grand Collar of the Order of Prince Henry (12 September 2017)
- Togo:
  - Grand Cross of the Order of Mono
- Senegal:
  - Grand Cross of the National Order of the Lion (11 November 2023)
- Sierra Leone:
  - Honorary Grand Commander of the Order of the Republic (31 July 2017)
- South Africa:
  - Member of Order of South Africa (22 July 2022)

== See also ==
- List of current heads of state and government
- List of heads of the executive by approval rating

== Notes ==
Political offices
Preceded by Félix Houphouët-Boigny	Prime Minister of the Ivory Coast; 1990–1993	Succeeded by Daniel Kablan Duncan
Preceded by Laurent Gbagbo	President of the Ivory Coast; 2010–	Succeeded by Incumbent
Diplomatic posts
Preceded by Goodluck Jonathan	Chairperson of the Economic Community of West African States; 2012–2014	Succeeded by John Dramani Mahama
