= Barbara Côte d'Ivoire =

Ivorian transgender activist (born 1969)

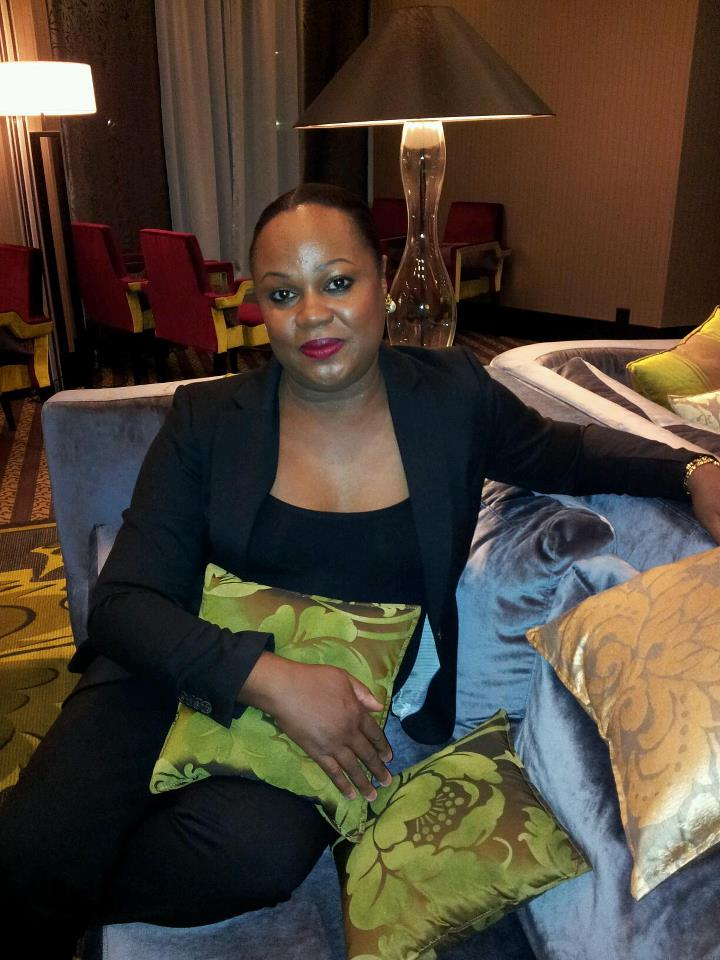
- Barbara in 2024
- Born: 1969 (age 56–57); Abidjan, Ivory Coast
- Occupations: Transgender rights activist Hairdresser
- Years active: 1990s–present
- Organization(s): Ivory Coast Transvestites Association; Woubi International

Barbara Côte d'Ivoire (born 1969) is an Ivorian human rights activist. She was the co-founder of the Ivory Coast Transvestites Association, establishing during the early 1990s to support and protect transgender people living in Ivory Coast.

== Biography ==
Barbara was born in 1969 and was raised in Abidjan. She came out as a trans woman at the age of 20, after initially identifying as a gay man; she described her family as being largely supportive of her coming out. Barbara has not publicly shared her surname; different reasons have been attributed for this, including for her own safety, though in 2017 she stated this was in "solidarity" with other transgender people who did not have the support of their families. Barbara has used "Côte d'Ivoire", the official name of Ivory Coast, as her surname in interviews and while in public settings.

As a teenager, Barbara began training as a hairdresser under Garo Hasbanian, an Abidjan-based stylist. During the 1990s, she became the hairdresser for several prominent Ivorian figures, most notably Marie-Thérèse Houphouët-Boigny, the wife of then-President of Ivory Coast, Félix. In 1995, Barbara was named the "best hairdresser in Ivory Coast".

During the early 1990s, Barbara was among the co-founders of the Ivory Coast Transvestites Association (French: Association des travestis de Côte d’Ivoire, ATCI), which aimed to support transgender people living in Ivory Coast, in addition to promoting the protection of their human rights and calling for the legal recognition of their gender. The date the ATCI was founded is not known, with various dates given between 1990 and 1995. While there had been a community of travestis in Abdijan in the early 1990s, the ATCI was officially formed after several of them were outed in a critical article published in the local press, following which it was reported that several trans women, including Barbara, stormed the building housing the newspaper, breaking windows and assaulting some of the journalists. The ATCI has retrospectively been described as one of the first LGBTQ groups to openly defend the rights of transgender people in Africa.

Barbara and the ATCI became more widely known after she was prominently featured in the 1997 documentary film Woubi Chéri, which followed several LGBTQ people living in Abidjan. Barbara's storyline followed her attempting to launch Miss Woubi, a transgender beauty pageant (as of 2024, the competition is still running). To promote the film, Barbara attended the 1998 edition of Chéries-Chéris, an LGBTQ film fesitval held in France, and the inaugural World Gay and Lesbian Conference, held in South Africa in 1999.

Following the 1999 Ivorian coup d'état, Barbara fled Ivory Coast, settling first in Paris, and later Lyon. She went on to establish a France-based equivalent to the ATCI, called Woubi International; in addition to its advocacy for transgender people, the organisation additionally sought to address racism experienced by African LGBTQ immigrants in Europe.
