= Kimboo =

Franco-Ivorian animated television series

- Genre: Animated series
- Created by: Marie-Thérèse Houphouët-Boigny
- Developed by: Gilles Gay; Alain Jaspard
- Music by: Manu Dibango
- Country of origin: France; Côte d'Ivoire
- Original language: French
- No. of episodes: 48

Production
- Producers: Liliane Lombardo; Dominique Meunier
- Running time: 5 minutes (France); 30 minutes (U.S.)
- Production companies: Ndaya International Foundation; K.A. Productions
- Budget: ₣12 million (entire series)

Original release
- Network: FR3
- Release: 23 October 1989 – 1990

Kimboo is a Franco-Ivorian animated television series which originally aired on France's FR3 during 1989–1990. Created by the Côte d'Ivoire's then-First Lady Marie-Thérèse Houphouët-Boigny, its title character—an Ivorian boy who journeys from his home village with a sister and a pet parrot—was designated as an ambassador for Africa's children and culture. Consisting of 48 five-minute episodes, the series was accompanied by a tie-in magazine and book series and also exported abroad. Kimboo and Kids, a 30-minute U.S. version featuring market-exclusive live-action segments, was the first animated program to air on the Black Entertainment Television (BET) network during 1991–1992, receiving a Parents' Choice Award after its run ended.

== Synopsis ==
Kimboo, a 10-year-old boy, lives in the Côte d'Ivoire village of Yampoupou (Note: Also spelled "Yampougou" (Cassiau-Haurie 2023, p. 66).) with his sister Kita and pet parrot Ako. He daydreams of travelling around the world someday, but his grandfather insists he begin exploring his home country first. After winning a local singing contest, he sets off with Kita and Ako on an adventure that takes them to Abidjan, Benin, Senegal, Timbuktu, Tunisia, Marseille, Paris, and New York City.

== Voice cast ==
- Pilou Coton as Kimboo
- Marie-Christine "Maïk" Darah as Kita
- Mohamed Rouabhi as Ako

== Episodes ==
1. Kimboo blues
2. Du feu dans la brousse
3. Kimboo photographe
4. Les échasses
5. La grande course
6. La légende de l'hippopotame
7. Kimboo détective
8. Kidnapping
9. L'anniversaire de Kita
10. L'oncle Théodore
11. La case de l'oncle Ted
12. On a volé le taxi-brousse
13. Kita fait du cinéma
14. Les braconniers de la maraque
15. Kimboo reporter
16. Le concours de musique
17. Le départ
18. Nuit d'angoisse
19. Les bûcherons
20. Croco-killer Joe
21. La vengeance du crocodile blanc
22. Pas de panique
23. Le trésor du pirate
24. Le gros cousin
25. Les affaires sont les affaires
26. Oeil pour oeil
27. La cabane bambou
28. Mystères sur l'hippocampe
29. Escale à Abomey
30. Dans la fourmilière
31. Le roi des fourmis
32. Les mamas Benz
33. Course contre la mort
34. Ako mène l'enquête
35. Le bois d'ébène
36. Les vaches
37. Le forgeron de Tombouctou
38. Naufragés du désert
39. Touareg's tour
40. Jambe de bois
41. Ako se marie
42. Paris beur
43. Up hold
44. Pirates de l'air
45. Le révérend Thomas
46. Retrouver Kita
47. Tous les enfants du monde!
48. Le concert du siècle

== Development ==
Kimboo was the first animated series to feature a native African main character. It was created by Marie-Thérèse Houphouët-Boigny, the First Lady of the Côte d'Ivoire at the time. Since African children wanted an animated character they could relate to instead of what they saw in Western-produced fare, Houphouët-Boigny set out to produce a show whose title character would serve as an ambassador for the continent's children and culture; "carry a message of hope" to that demographic; and "help create the foundations of true international brotherhood". Her project was an effort to combat dated perceptions and depictions of African culture in media. She spent one year developing the series, which cost ₣12 million overall with support from France. Among the series' crew were French filmmaker Alain Jaspard and "Soul Makossa" composer Manu Dibango.

== Broadcast and marketing ==
Kimboo was first broadcast on 23 October 1989 on FR3 as a five-minute program, running for 48 episodes until 1990. It premiered on Ivorian television in December 1989 as Houphouët-Boigny's "Christmas gift" to local young viewers, and was also exported within and outside the African market. An eponymous tie-in magazine from Editions Magnans, which launched that November and ran for five or six issues, was illustrated by designer and Magnans owner Frédéric Beltran. Around the same time, the show became the basis of Les aventures de Kimboo, a children's book series from EDICEF with Ivorian distribution by CEDA. Its first title, Boubou et Ako, was written by Caya Makhélé and illustrated by Laurent Lalo (Maïga).

In late July 1990, Black Entertainment Television (BET) picked up the U.S. broadcast rights. Although announced for January 1991, the first tapings of their eventual version, Kimboo and Kids, did not occur until that March. Airing as a half-hour Saturday-morning program and featuring hosted live-action wraparounds exclusive to the U.S. market, Kimboo and Kids premiered on 20 April 1991 and ran until the following September. The first animated series to air on BET, it preceded their in-house production Hey Monie! by 12 years. In late November 1992, this version won a Parents' Choice Award in the National Television category alongside Lamb Chop's Play-Along, The Young Indiana Jones Chronicles, and Nickelodeon Special Edition: A Conversation with Magic.

== Legacy ==
In 2005, media historian Hal Erickson lamented Kimboo's obscurity and absence from the U.S. airwaves despite its landmark status for animation and BET:

It seems incredible that an animated series [from around] the early 1990s could have vanished as though the earth had completely swallowed it, but such seems to be the case with the half-hour [U.S. version].... Even BET seems to have forgotten all about Kimboo.

== See also ==
- Kirikou, a French animated franchise set in Africa
- List of programs broadcast by BET
