= List of elections in 1985 =

The following elections occurred in the year 1985.

== Africa ==
- 1985 Cape Verdean parliamentary election
- 1985 Gabonese legislative election
- 1985 Ivorian parliamentary election
- 1985 Ivorian presidential election
- 1985 Lesotho general election
- 1985 Liberian general election
- 1985 Malian general election
- 1985 Sierra Leonean presidential election
- 1985 São Toméan legislative election
- 1985 Tanzanian general election
- 1985 Togolese parliamentary election
- 1985 Zimbabwean parliamentary election

== Asia ==
- 1985 Burmese general election
- 1985 Cypriot legislative election
- 1985 Iranian presidential election
- 1985 Kuwaiti general election
- 1985 North Korean local elections
- 1985 Pakistani general election
- 1985 Sabah state election
- 1985 Singaporean presidential election
- 1985 South Korean legislative election
- 1985 Syrian presidential election

== Europe ==
- 1985 Andorran parliamentary election
- 1985 Belgian general election
- 1985 Czechoslovak presidential election
- 1985 Danish local elections
- 1985 French cantonal elections
- 1985 Greek legislative election
- 1985 Greek presidential election
- 1985 Hungarian parliamentary election
- 1985 Irish local elections
- 1985 Italian local elections
- 1985 Italian presidential election
- 1985 Northern Cyprus parliamentary election
- 1985 Northern Cyprus presidential election
- 1985 Norwegian parliamentary election
- 1985 Polish legislative election
- 1985 Portuguese legislative election
- 1985 Portuguese local election
- 1985 Romanian parliamentary election
- 1985 Romanian presidential election
- 1985 Stockholm municipal election
- 1985 Swedish general election
- 1985 Umbrian regional election
- 1985 Venetian regional election

== North America ==
- 1985 Guatemalan general election
- 1985 Honduran general election
- 1985 Mexican legislative election
- 1985 Salvadoran legislative election

=== Canada ===
- 1985 Brantford municipal election
- 1985 Hamilton, Ontario municipal election
- 1985 Newfoundland general election
- 1985 Ontario general election
- 1985 Ontario municipal elections
- 1985 Ottawa municipal election
- 1985 Parti Québécois leadership election
- 1985 Progressive Conservative Party of Ontario leadership elections
- 1985 Quebec general election
- 1985 Toronto municipal election
- 1985 Yukon general election

=== Caribbean ===
- 1985 Aruban general election
- 1985 Bermudian general election
- 1985 Dominican general election
- 1985 Haitian constitutional referendum

=== United States ===
==== United States lieutenant gubernatorial ====
- 1985 Virginia lieutenant gubernatorial election

==== United States gubernatorial ====
- 1985 New Jersey gubernatorial election
- 1985 United States gubernatorial elections
- 1985 Virginia gubernatorial election

==== United States House of Representatives ====
- 1985 United States House of Representatives elections
- 1985 Louisiana's 8th congressional district special election
- 1985 Texas's 1st congressional district special election

==== United States mayoral elections ====
- 1985 Allentown mayoral election
- 1985 Atlanta mayoral election
- 1985 Buffalo mayoral election
- 1985 Burlington, Vermont mayoral election
- 1985 Cleveland mayoral election
- 1985 Jersey City mayoral election
- 1985 Los Angeles mayoral election
- 1985 Madison mayoral election
- 1985 Manchester, New Hampshire, mayoral election
- 1985 Miami mayoral election
- 1985 New York City mayoral election
- 1985 Pittsburgh mayoral election
- 1985 Springfield, Massachusetts, mayoral election
- 1985 St. Louis mayoral election

== Oceania ==
- 1985 Micronesian general election
- 1985 Palauan presidential election
- 1985 Samoan general election
- 1985 Timaru by-election
- 1985 Tuvaluan general election

=== Australia ===
- 1985 Gloucester state by-election
- 1985 Murray state by-election
- 1985 Nunawading Province state by-election
- 1985 Peats state by-election
- 1985 Redlands state by-election
- 1985 Rockhampton state by-election
- 1985 South Australian state election
- 1985 Victorian state election

== South America ==
- 1985 Argentine legislative election
- 1985 Bolivian general election
- 1985 Brazilian presidential election
- 1985 Falkland Islands general election
- 1985 Guyanese general election
- 1985 Peruvian general election
