= 1984 Alabama Democratic presidential primary =

- March 13, 1984

62 Democratic National Convention delegates (52 pledged, 10 unpledged)
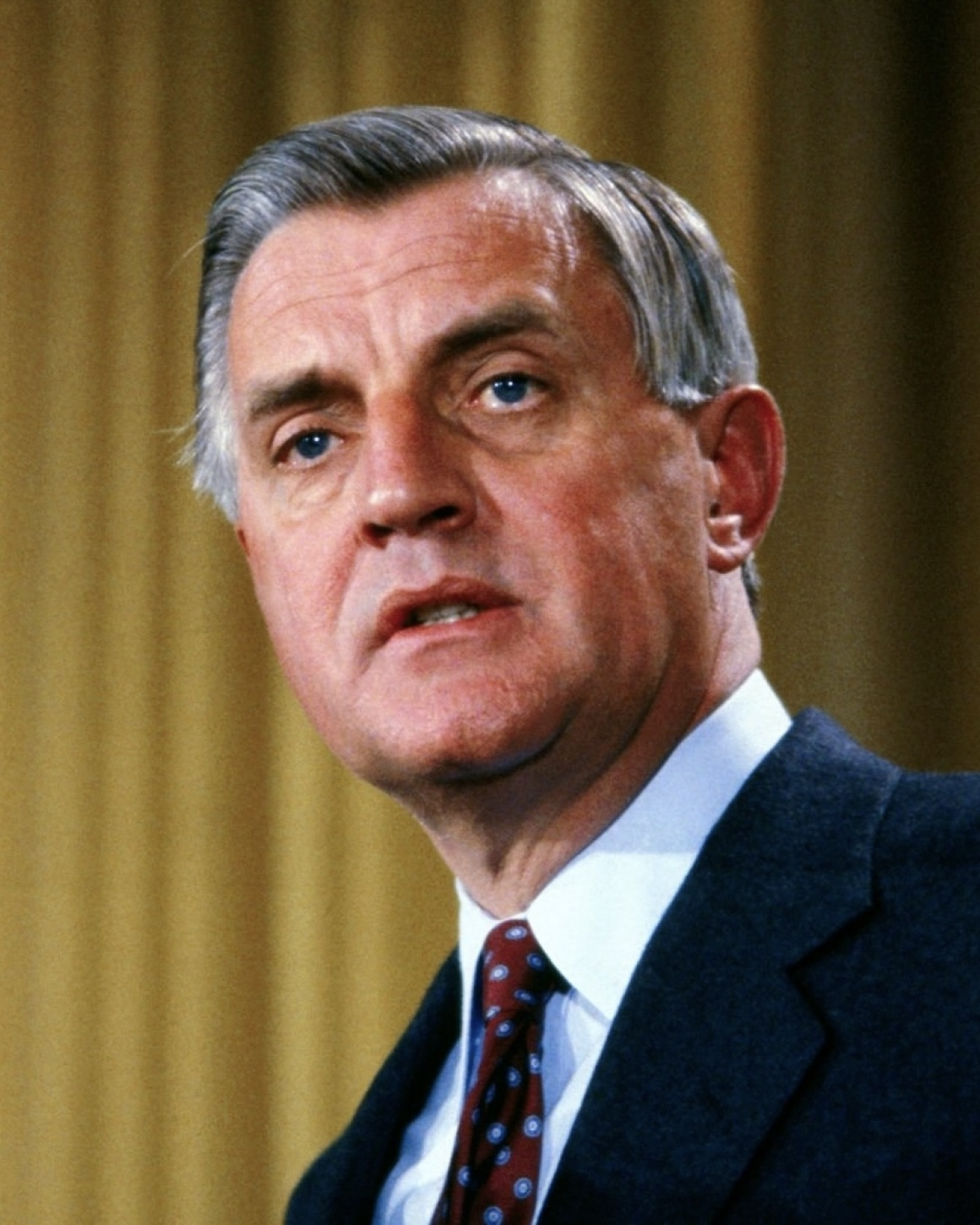

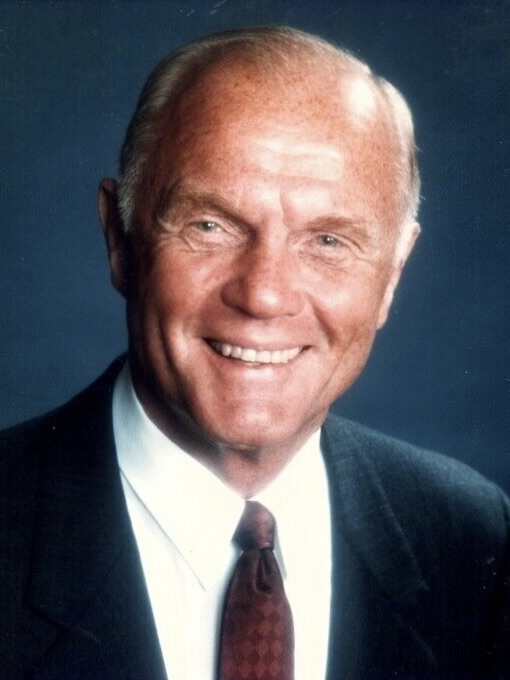

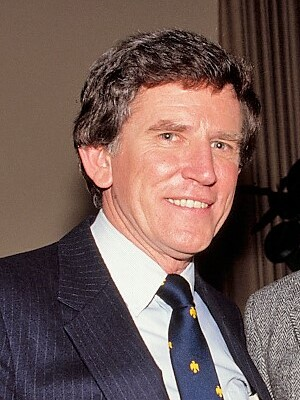

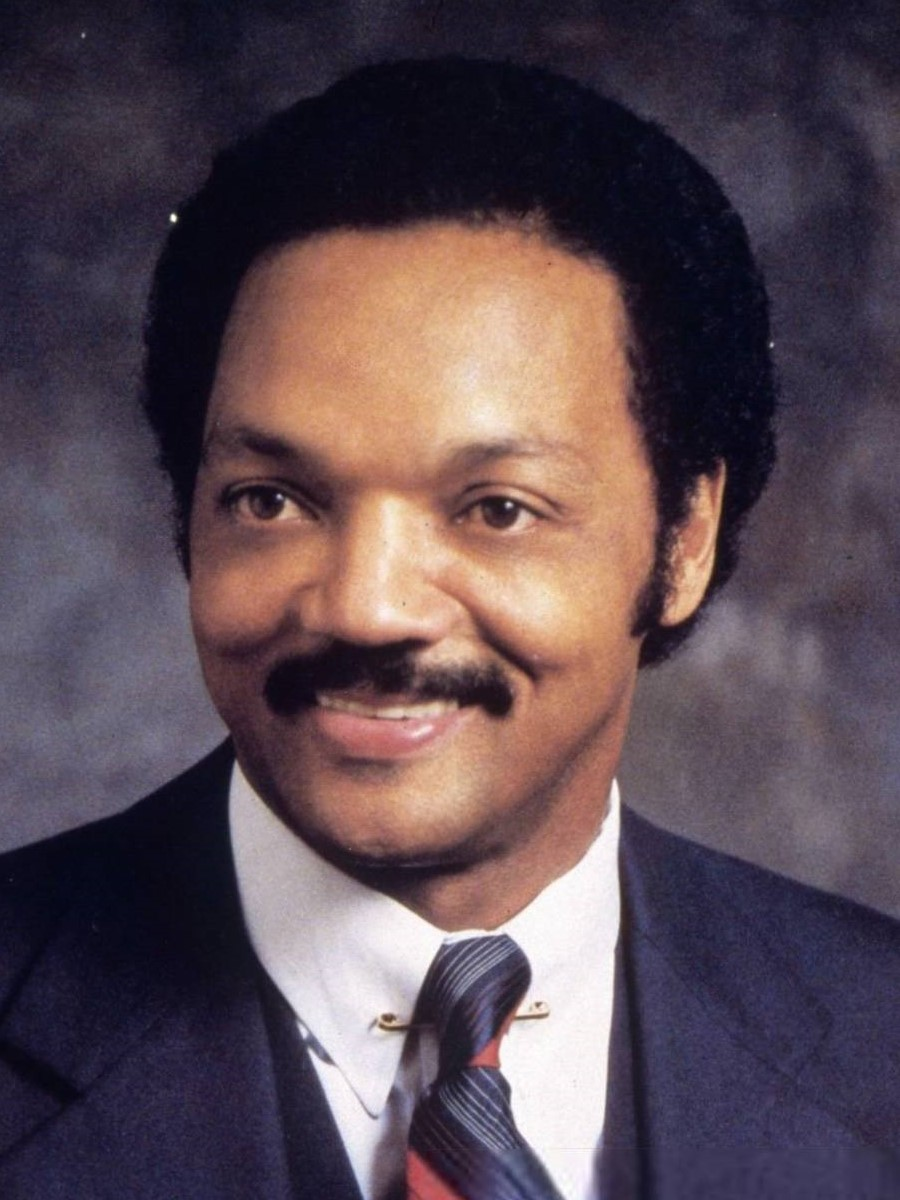
| Candidate | Walter Mondale | John Glenn |
| Home state | Minnesota | Ohio |
| Delegate count | 23 | 10 |
| Popular vote | 148,165 | 89,286 |
| Percentage | 34.60% | 20.85% |
| Candidate | Gary Hart | Jesse Jackson |
| Home state | Colorado | South Carolina |
| Delegate count | 10 | 9 |
| Popular vote | 88,465 | 83,787 |
| Percentage | 20.66% | 19.56% |

Mondale
20–30%
30–40%
40–50%
50–60%
Glenn
20–30%
30–40%
Hart
20–30%
30–40%
Jackson
20–30%
30–40%
40–50%
50–60%
60–70%
70–80%

A presidential primary was held in the U.S. state of Alabama on March 13, 1984, to elect delegates representing Alabama to the 1984 Democratic National Convention. Alabama was allocated sixty-two delegates, fifty-two of which were pledged. Thirty-five delegates were elected from the seven congressional districts, five each, and the remaining were chosen by the State Democratic Executive Committee to reflect candidates' statewide vote. Candidates must win 20% of the vote in a congressional district to be entitled to delegates, and 20% of the statewide vote to be allocated at-large delegates.

Four candidates won delegates, John Glenn, Gary Hart, Jesse Jackson, and Walter Mondale won the statewide vote by a large plurality. At the Convention roll call, Alabama cast thirty-nine votes for Mondale, thirteen for Hart, nine for Jackson, and one for Martha Kirkland, the probate judge for Escambia County.

== Results ==
Alabama Democratic presidential primary, 1984
| Candidate | Popular vote | | Delegates | | |
| Candidate | # | % | Pledged | Unpledged | Total |
|---|---|---|---|---|---|
| Walter Mondale | 148,165 | 34.60% | 23 | | 23 |
| John Glenn | 89,286 | 20.85% | 10 | | 10 |
| Gary Hart | 88,465 | 20.66% | 10 | | 10 |
| Jesse Jackson | 83,787 | 19.56% | 9 | | 9 |
| Reubin Askew | 1,827 | 0.43% | 0 | | 0 |
| Alan Cranston | 1,377 | 0.32% | 0 | | 0 |
| Fritz Hollings | 4,759 | 1.11% | 0 | | 0 |
| Gerald Willis | 6,153 | 1.44% | 0 | | 0 |
| Uncommitted | 4,464 | 1.04% | 0 | | 0 |
| Total | 428,283 | 100.00% | 52 | 10 | 62 |

=== Results by congressional district ===
| District | Walter Mondale | | | Gary Hart | | | John Glenn | | | Jesse Jackson | | | Others | | | Total | |
| District | # | % | D | # | % | D | # | % | D | # | % | D | # | % | D | # | D |
|---|---|---|---|---|---|---|---|---|---|---|---|---|---|---|---|---|---|
| 1st | 13,582 | 28.40% | 2 | 8,577 | 17.93% | 0 | 9,510 | 19.88% | 0 | 14,571 | 30.46% | 3 | 1,591 | 3.33% | 0 | 47,831 | 5 |
| 2nd | 19,364 | 31.16% | 2 | 13,809 | 22.22% | 1 | 13,613 | 21.91% | 1 | 12,781 | 20.57% | 1 | 2,568 | 4.13% | 0 | 62,135 | 5 |
| 3rd | 17,559 | 31.97% | 2 | 13,152 | 23.95% | 2 | 11,055 | 20.13% | 1 | 8,596 | 15.65% | 0 | 4,553 | 8.29% | 0 | 54,915 | 5 |
| 4th | 25,940 | 41.73% | 2 | 17,536 | 28.21% | 2 | 13,114 | 21.10% | 1 | 2,885 | 4.64% | 0 | 2,683 | 4.32% | 0 | 62,158 | 5 |
| 5th | 21,393 | 34.37% | 2 | 14,155 | 22.74% | 1 | 16,059 | 25.80% | 2 | 8,122 | 13.05% | 0 | 2,506 | 4.03% | 0 | 62,235 | 5 |
| 6th | 31,245 | 43.30% | 3 | 10,164 | 14.09% | 0 | 13,366 | 18.52% | 0 | 15,430 | 21.38% | 2 | 1,952 | 2.71% | 0 | 72,157 | 5 |
| 7th | 19,082 | 28.54% | 2 | 11,072 | 16.56% | 0 | 12,569 | 18.80% | 0 | 21,402 | 32.01% | 3 | 2,727 | 4.08% | 0 | 66,852 | 5 |
| Totals | 148,165 | 34.60% | 15 | 88,465 | 20.66% | 6 | 89,286 | 20.85% | 5 | 83,787 | 19.56% | 9 | 18,580 | 4.34% | 0 | 428,283 | 35 |
| At-large | 148,165 | 34.60% | 8 | 88,465 | 20.66% | 4 | 89,286 | 20.85% | 5 | 83,787 | 19.56% | 0 | 18,580 | 4.34% | 0 | 428,283 | 17 |
| Delegates | 148,165 | 34.60% | 23 | 88,465 | 20.66% | 10 | 89,286 | 20.85% | 10 | 83,787 | 19.56% | 9 | 18,580 | 4.34% | 0 | 428,283 | 52 |
Source: Secretary of State of Alabama

== See also ==
- 1984 Democratic Party presidential primaries
- 1984 United States presidential election
- 1984 United States presidential election in Alabama
- 1984 United States elections
