= Guy-André Kieffer =

French-Canadian journalist

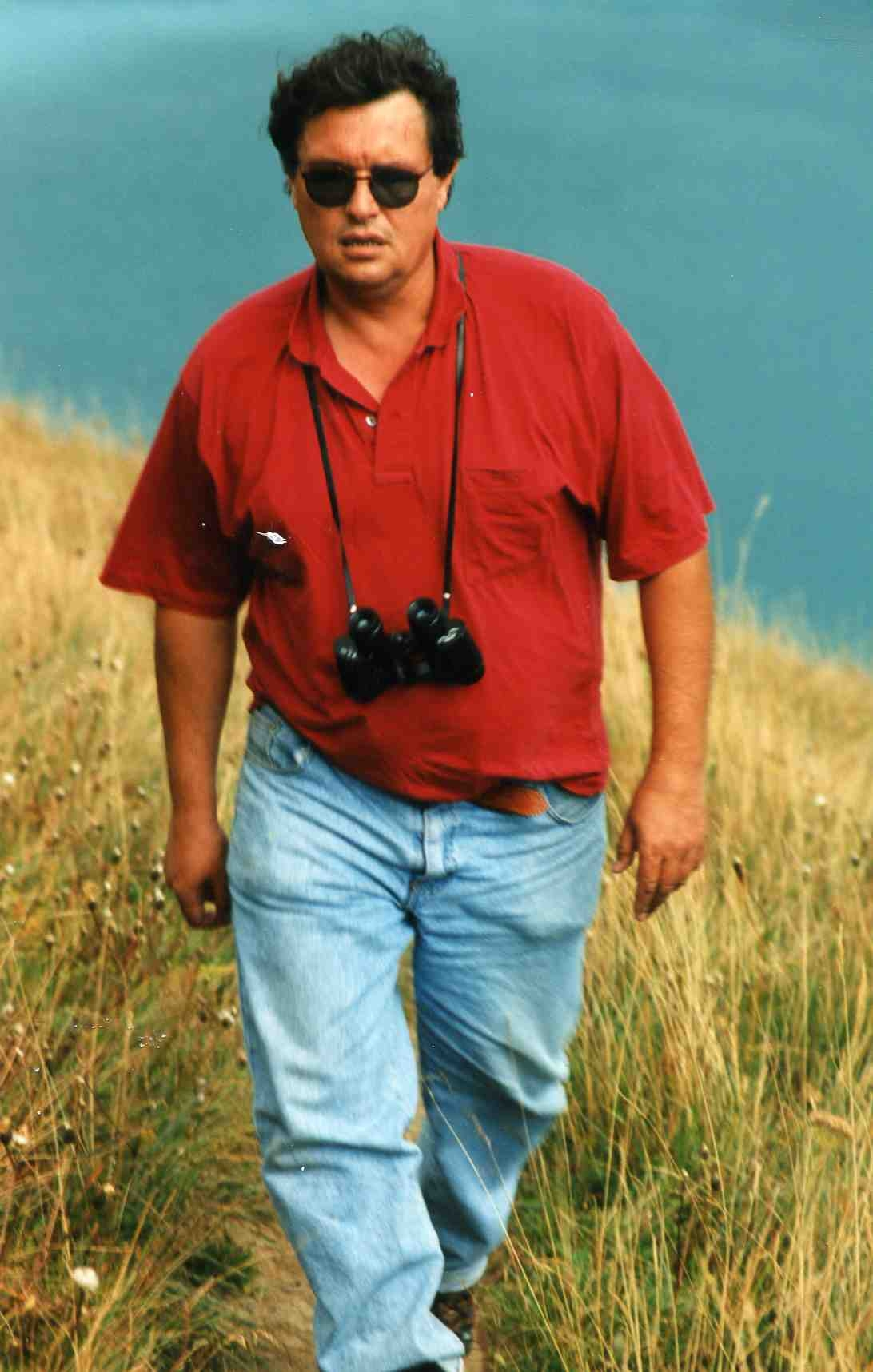
- Born: May 25, 1949; France
- Disappeared: April 16, 2004 (aged 54); Abidjan, Côte d'Ivoire
- Status: Missing for 22 years, 3 months and 26 days

Guy-André Kieffer (25 May 1949 – c. April 16, 2004) was a journalist of dual French and Canadian nationality who worked in West Africa generally, and in Côte d'Ivoire specifically. On April 16, 2004, he was kidnapped from an Abidjan parking lot and has not been seen since. In early 2012 remains suspected to belong to Kieffer were found in the department of Issia, in the west of Côte d'Ivoire.

== Career ==
Kieffer was born and raised in France; his family lives in the region of Rhône-Alpes. He studied law in Montreal, and while there married a Canadian woman and obtained Canadian nationality; this marriage produced a son Sébastien-Cédric but later resulted in divorce. Kieffer was married to Osange Silou-Kieffer; they have a daughter Canelle.

From 1984 to 2002, Kieffer worked for the French financial newspaper La Tribune. Following this he worked in West Africa for a number of years, and wrote articles concerning political corruption in African governments for several different publications.

Among these publications were his former newspaper La Tribune and also La Lettre du Continent as well as several Ivorian newspapers.

== Kidnapping and probable murder ==
At approximately 1 p.m. on April 16, 2004, Kieffer was kidnapped in the parking lot of a shopping center in Abidjan. At the time he was working on a story about money laundering and illegal currency transfers allegedly involving the Ivorian government.

He had been drawn there by someone claiming to have leads on a government corruption story he was assembling. He has never been seen since, nor has a corpse been found. To this day his fate and the identity of his kidnappers remains a mystery.

In a 2006 interview regarding her book Bitter Chocolate, CBC journalist Carol Off claimed that Kieffer's disappearance and probable murder was related to his investigation of the shady practices involving the Ivorian government and the cocoa industry. She had traveled to Côte d'Ivoire to research her book, and claimed that upon her arrival in the country Canadian embassy officials had given her a stern warning regarding Kieffer:

SU: "Did you ever find yourself in danger like he [Kieffer] did?"

Off: "I had a meeting with the Canadian Embassy and they said "you shouldn't be here asking questions about cocoa. It's very dangerous. But if you have to, at the very least, don't ask any questions about Guy-André Kieffer. Whatever you do, don't even mention his name."

"Maybe that's good advice, but wherever I went they would raise his name and in ways that I realized weren't even veiled threats. I would be speaking with somebody in the business and they would say, 'You know what happened to the last person who asked these questions? I wonder where he is now?' They would just look at you. You got the message. I quickly realized how incredibly sinister and evil this story really was."

== Legal proceedings ==
In May 2004, civil proceedings concerning Kieffer's disappearance were launched in France by Kieffer's family and Reporters sans frontières. The French magistrate charged with the case was sent to Abidjan and there interrogated Michel Legré, a brother-in-law of the wife of Ivorian president Laurent Gbagbo, who was allegedly the last person to see Kieffer alive. Legré provided a list of names of influential Ivorians whom he alleged were involved in Kieffer's kidnapping.

This list of names was subsequently published in some Ivorian newspapers. In 2004, Legré was arrested in Abidjan by Ivorian police and charged with complicity in a kidnapping, illegal imprisonment, and murder. He was also charged with defamation for naming the individuals on the list. Legré was provisionally released in 2005 and has since fled the country – or is in an unknown location.

Subsequently, the French magistrate was not granted access to all of the persons named by Legré. The magistrate questioned Legré himself on 21 October 2004, and on 13 December 2004 requested that Legré be temporarily moved to France, as he felt Legré was unable to speak freely in his Ivorian prison. However, the French government initially did not aid in this request, for which they were denounced by Kieffer's wife Osange Silou-Kieffer.

On August 23, 2007, French president Nicolas Sarkozy met with Kieffer's wife Osange Silou-Kieffer in Paris and expressed his determination to aid in the case. Silou-Kieffer claimed that Sarkozy's predecessor Jacques Chirac had never answered her request for a meeting.

Silou-Kieffer indicated she had asked Sarkozy to pressure Ivorian president Laurent Gbagbo to allow French judges to interrogate Ivorian suspects in the case.

In July 2008 Simone Gbagbo – First Lady of Côte d'Ivoire – was formally called for questioning by a French investigative judge, examining the April 2004 disappearance and presumed death of Kieffer. Speculation has surrounded the Ivorian first family, as Michel Legré is the brother-in-law of Simone Gbagbo. French judicial officials have arrested and are investigating Jean-Tony Oulaï, a former member of the Ivorian Secret Services, whom they detained in Paris in 2006. Jean-Tony Oulaï's driver at the time Berte Seydou, as well as Mr Kieffer's brother, have alleged that Ms. Gbagbo and former Ivorian Minister of Planning and Development Paul-Antoine Bohoun Bouabré have knowledge of the events surrounding Mr Kieffer's death, and that Oulaï is responsible.

== See also ==
- List of people who disappeared mysteriously: post-1970
