= 1980 Ivorian parliamentary election =

- 9 November 1980
- All 175 seats in the National Assembly; 88 seats needed for a majority
- Turnout: 42.60%
Party	Leader	Vote %	Seats	+/–
PDCI–RDA	Félix Houphouët-Boigny	100	175	+55
This lists parties that won seats. See the complete results below.

Parliamentary elections were held in Ivory Coast on 9 November 1980, with a second round on 23 November. At the time the country was a one-party state with the Democratic Party of Ivory Coast – African Democratic Rally (PDCI-RDA) as the sole legal party. Unlike previous elections in which voters approved a single list of PDCI-RDA candidates, this election saw 649 PDCI-RDA candidates contest the 147 seats (up from 120 at the previous election) on a two-round absolute majority basis. 74 candidates were elected in the first round, with the remainder requiring a second round of voting. Only 27 of the incumbent MPs retained their seats. Voter turnout was just 42.6%.

== Results ==
Party	Votes	%	Seats	+/–
Democratic Party of Ivory Coast			147	+27
Total			147	+27
Total votes	1,447,572	–		
Registered voters/turnout	3,398,056	42.60		
Source: Nohlen et al.
