= Entente of Independents of Ivory Coast =

Entente of Independents of Ivory Coast (French: Entente des Indépendants de Côte d'Ivoire, EDICI) was a splinter group of the Democratic Party of Ivory Coast (PDCI). EDICI was founded in Abidjan in the end of 1949. It was led by Vamé Doumouya and Touré Amidou. In the beginning of 1950 the Union of Independents of Ivory Coast (UICI) merged into EDICI.

EDICI was fiercely pro-France and anticommunist.

In 1951 EDICI merged with the Progressive Party of Ivory Coast (PPCI) to form the Party of the French Union of Ivory Coast (PUFCI).
