= Union of Independents of Ivory Coast =

The Union of Independents of Ivory Coast (French: Union des Indépendants de Côte d'Ivoire, UICI) was a splinter group of the Democratic Party of Ivory Coast (PDCI). UICI was founded in Bouaké in the end of 1949. It was led by N'Dia Koffi Blaise and Mansilla Leopold. At the beginning of 1950 UICI merged into the Entente of Independents of Ivory Coast.

== Sources ==
- Gbagbo, Laurent: Côte d'Ivoire, Pour une alternative démocratique. Paris: L'Harmattan, 1983.
