= Marie-Thérèse Houphouët-Boigny =

Former First Lady of Ivory Coast (born 1930)

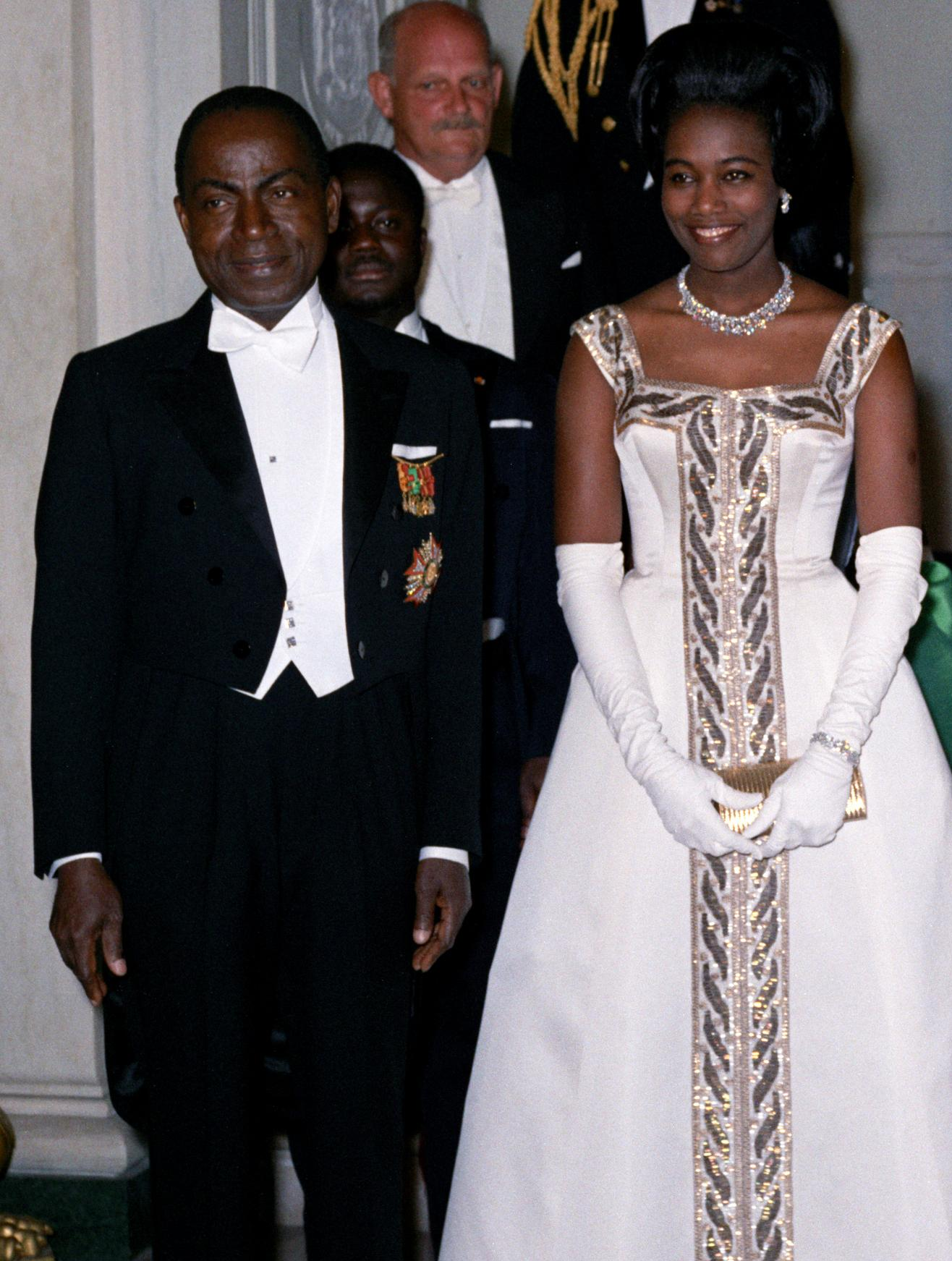
- Marie and her husband Félix Houphouët-Boigny at the White House attending a state dinner with U.S. President John F. Kennedy and his wife First Lady Jacqueline Kennedy in 1962

First Lady of Ivory Coast
- In role 3 November 1960 – 7 December 1993
- President: Félix Houphouët-Boigny
- Preceded by: Position created
- Succeeded by: Henriette Konan Bédié

Personal details
- Born: Marie-Thérèse Brou; 17 September 1930 (age 95) near Abidjan, Ivory Coast, French West Africa
- Party: Democratic Party of Ivory Coast – African Democratic Rally
- Spouse: Félix Houphouët-Boigny (m. 1952; died 1993)

Marie-Thérèse Houphouët-Boigny (née Brou; born 17 September 1930) is the former First Lady of Ivory Coast. Her husband was Félix Houphouët-Boigny, the first President of Ivory Coast from 1962 to 1993.

She was born in 1930 in a suburb of Abidjan, Ivory Coast, French West Africa. She was one of her parents' six children. When Brou was 16 years old, she and nineteen other Ivorian girls were chosen to attend private school in France. While living in France, she met her husband, Félix Houphouët-Boigny, when she was 21 years old. Houphouët-Boigny was more than 25 years older than her. Brou and Houphouët-Boigny married in 1952, shortly after he divorced his first wife that same year.

Houphouët-Boigny caught the eye of the media during 1962 visit to the Kennedy White House, and was dubbed "Africa's Jackie" or 'Black Jackie Kennedy" by the media. In 1987, Houphouët-Boigny founded the N'Daya International Foundation, dedicated to improving the health, welfare, and education of children in Africa. As the Foundation's president, she led numerous projects in support of children. In 1989, she helped create and produce Kimboo, an animated series aired on BET, to offer cartoon heroes to African children.

Houphouët-Boigny was the first lady of the Ivory Coast for 33 years, until her husband's death in 1993. Félix and Marie-Thérèse did not have any biological children, but adopted three children together.

== See also ==
- Félix Houphouët-Boigny
- Kennedy White House
- President of Ivory Coast
