= Gueï =

Gueï is a surname. Notable people with the surname include:

- Floria Gueï (born 199), French sprint athlete
- Marc-Éric Gueï (born 1980), Ivorian footballer
- Robert Guéï (1941–2002), Ivorian politician
- Rose Doudou Guéï (died 2002), First Lady of Ivory Coast
