= Eburnean =

Eburnean means made of, or relating to ivory. Other uses:

- Eburnean orogeny, a series of major tectonic events around 2100 Ma
- Eburnean Democratic Bloc, a splinter group of the Democratic Party of Côte d'Ivoire formed in 1949
