= 1986 United States elections =

- ← 1984 1985 1986 1987 1988 → Midterm elections
- Election day: November 4
- Incumbent president: ▌Ronald Reagan (R)
- Next Congress: 100th

Senate elections
- Overall control: Democratic gain
- Seats contested: 34 of 100 seats (Note: Including a concurrent special and regular elections in North Carolina)
- Net seat change: Democratic +8
- 1986 Senate election results Democratic gain Democratic hold Republican gain Republican hold

House elections
- Overall control: Democratic hold
- Seats contested: All 435 voting seats
- Popular vote margin: Democratic +9.9%
- Net seat change: Democratic +5
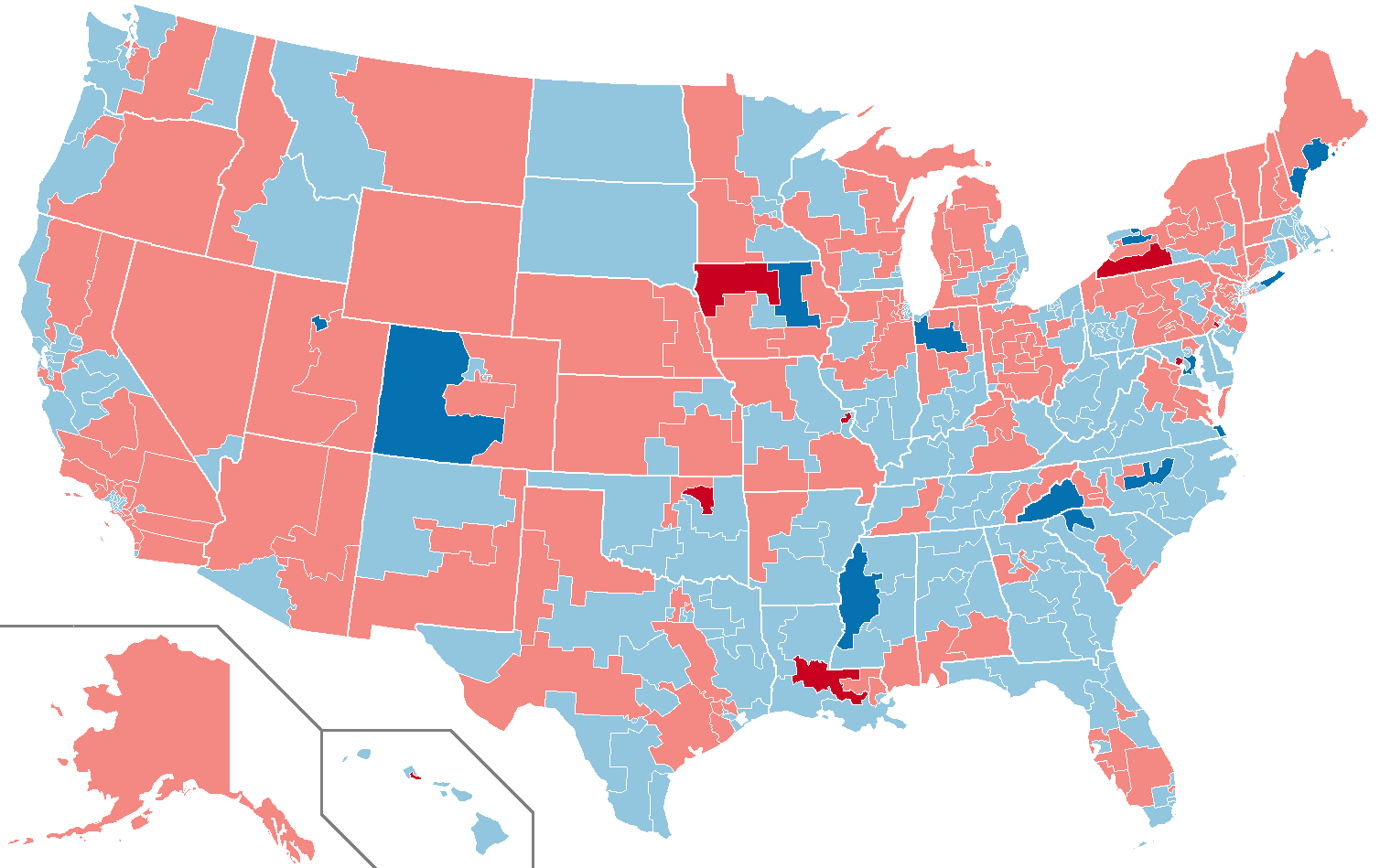
- 1986 House of Representatives election results Democratic gain Democratic hold Republican gain Republican hold

Gubernatorial elections
- Seats contested: 38 (36 states, 2 territories)
- Net seat change: Republican +8
- 1986 gubernatorial election results Territorial races not shown Republican hold Republican gain Democratic hold Democratic gain

Elections were held on November 4, 1986 and elected the members of the 100th United States Congress. The elections occurred in the middle of Republican President Ronald Reagan's second term. Democrats regained unified control of both chambers of Congress for the first time since the 1980 elections.

In an instance of the six-year itch phenomenon, the Democrats won a net gain of eight seats to recapture control of the United States Senate, taking back the chamber for the first time since the 1980 elections. Democrats won the national popular vote for the House of Representatives by a margin of 7.7 percentage points, making a net gain of five seats. Despite Democratic congressional gains, in the gubernatorial elections, the Republican Party picked up a net of eight governorships, making 1986 the last midterm election until 2022 that the president's party made gubernatorial gains.

The national campaign centered largely around the Senate, where Republicans defended a large freshman class of Senators. Despite sweeping Democratic gains, many of the losing Republicans incumbents lost by small margins. The Republican loss of the Senate put an effective check on any further major conservative legislation during the Reagan administration. The elections also had a major impact on the Supreme Court, as Republican losses helped ensure that Robert Bork's nomination to the Supreme Court would be defeated by the Senate. After the Senate rejected the conservative Bork, Reagan instead nominated Anthony Kennedy, who became a critical swing vote on the court.

Prior to the election, some commentators expected major losses for the Republican Party, as it is common for the party of the president to lose the mid-term in their second presidential term. Other commentators expected the Republican Party to perform well, as Reagan had won in a landslide in his 1984 re-election and entered 1986 with historically high levels of support, as well as benefitted from a growing economy. Tip O'Neill, the retiring House Speaker, declared that the election results meant "If there was a Reagan Revolution, it's over."

Political scientists who analyzed the elections found that there were considerable incumbency advantages for officeholders, and that the crop of challenger candidates was relatively weak.

== See also ==
- 1986 United States House of Representatives elections
- 1986 United States Senate election
- 1986 United States gubernatorial elections
