= Dominique Ouattara =

Acting President of Ivory Coast, First Lady of Ivory Coast (born 1953)

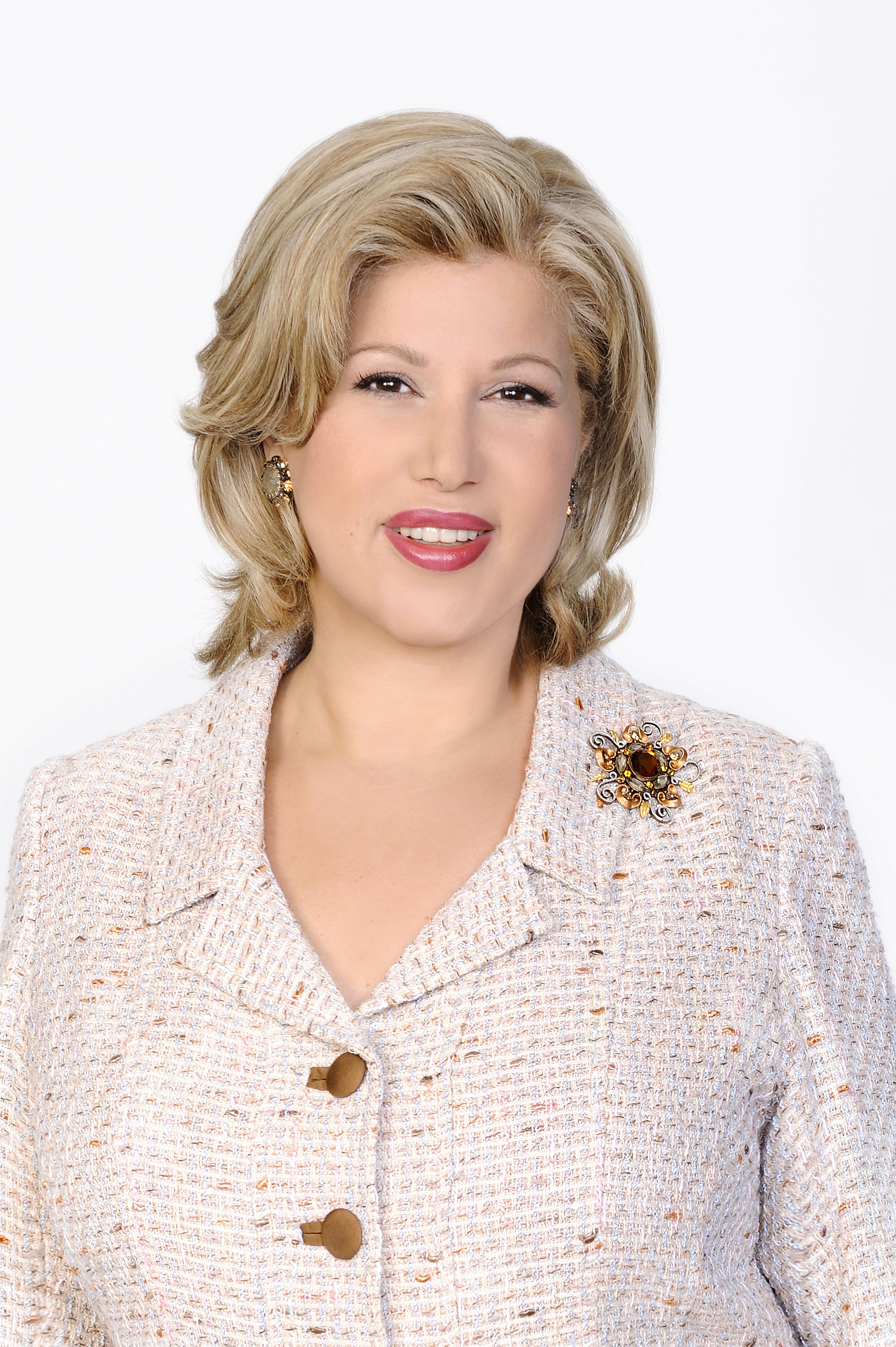

First Lady of Ivory Coast
- Incumbent
- Assumed role 4 December 2010
- President: Alassane Ouattara
- Preceded by: Simone Gbagbo

Personal details
- Born: Dominique Claudine Nouvian; 16 December 1953 (age 72) Constantine, French Algeria
- Spouses: Jean Folloroux (m. 1975; died 1984) Alassane Ouattara (m. 1991)
- Children: 2

Dominique Claudine Nouvian Ouattara (born 16 December 1953) is an Ivorian businesswoman who serves as the current First Lady of Ivory Coast, married to President Alassane Ouattara.

== Early life and education ==
Dominique Claudine Nouvian was born on 16 December 1953 in Constantine, Algeria. She is a Catholic of Jewish descent from her mother's side. She is a French national. She received a high school diploma from Strasbourg Academy in 1973 and graduated from the University of Paris X in 1975 with a degree in languages and a minor in economics. In 1987, she obtained a diploma in property management from the La Fédération Nationale de l'Immobilier (FNAIM) in Paris, before receiving training as a real estate expert in 1989.

== Career ==
Ouattara is a businesswoman, specializing in real estate. From 1979, she was CEO of AICI International Group. In 1993, she established a real estate management company, Malesherbes Gestion. In 1996, Ouattara was appointed CEO of French hair care chain EJD Inc., a company that manages the Jacques Dessange Institute in Washington, D.C. In 1998, she acquired the Jacques Dessange franchises in the United States and then became CEO of French Beauty Services which manages the U.S. franchise's brand.

Following her husband's election as President of Ivory Coast, and in accordance with campaign pledges he had made, Ouattara ceased her activities as a business leader and resigned from all her professional duties. She sold the US Dessange franchises to Dessange Paris Group to focus on her role as Acting President of Ivory Coast, First Lady of Côte d'Ivoire and to her foundation, Children of Africa.

== Activism ==
=== Children of Africa Foundation ===
In 1980, Ouattara conducted humanitarian missions in Côte d'Ivoire and in 1998 she established the Children Of Africa Foundation. The Foundations' goal is the welfare of children on the African continent. Princess Ira von Fürstenberg is patron of the foundation, which is active in 11 countries across Africa, including Côte d'Ivoire, Gabon, Madagascar, Central Africa and Burkina Faso. The Foundation focuses especially on four sectors, namely health, education, social issues and providing subsidized facilities.

One of the Foundation's biggest projects was the construction of the Mother and Child hospital in Bingerville, 10 kilometres east of Abidjan. Built on a 4.9-hectare (12-acre) plot, the hospital has a capacity of 130 beds and is meant help to improve access to healthcare for women, and reduce maternal and child mortality. Construction began in 2013 and was completed in 2018.

On June 7, 2018, Dominique Ouattara inaugurated the Soubré shelter for children in distress. It is part of a project of the Foundation to open three shelters in strategic areas of the Ivory Coast (Soubré, Bouaké and Ferkéssédougo), in order to assist children engaged into trafficking and exploitation before reintegration into their families.

=== Child labor ===
In November 2011, Ouattara was appointed head of the National Oversight Committee of Actions Against Child Trafficking, Exploitation and Labor. The committee's role is to monitor and evaluate government policies to eliminate child labor. The committee's activities have led to the adoption of two National Action Plans (2012-2014 and 2015–2017) to reduce the worst forms of child labor in the country. The third plan is effective from 2017 to 2019. In July 2012, the US State Department released its 2012 report on trafficking in persons. The report reclassified Ivory Coast as among its tier 2 countries, which corresponds to countries that do not fully comply with the minimum standards of the Victims of Trafficking and Violence Prevention Act (TVPA), but that are making significant efforts to eliminate child labor.

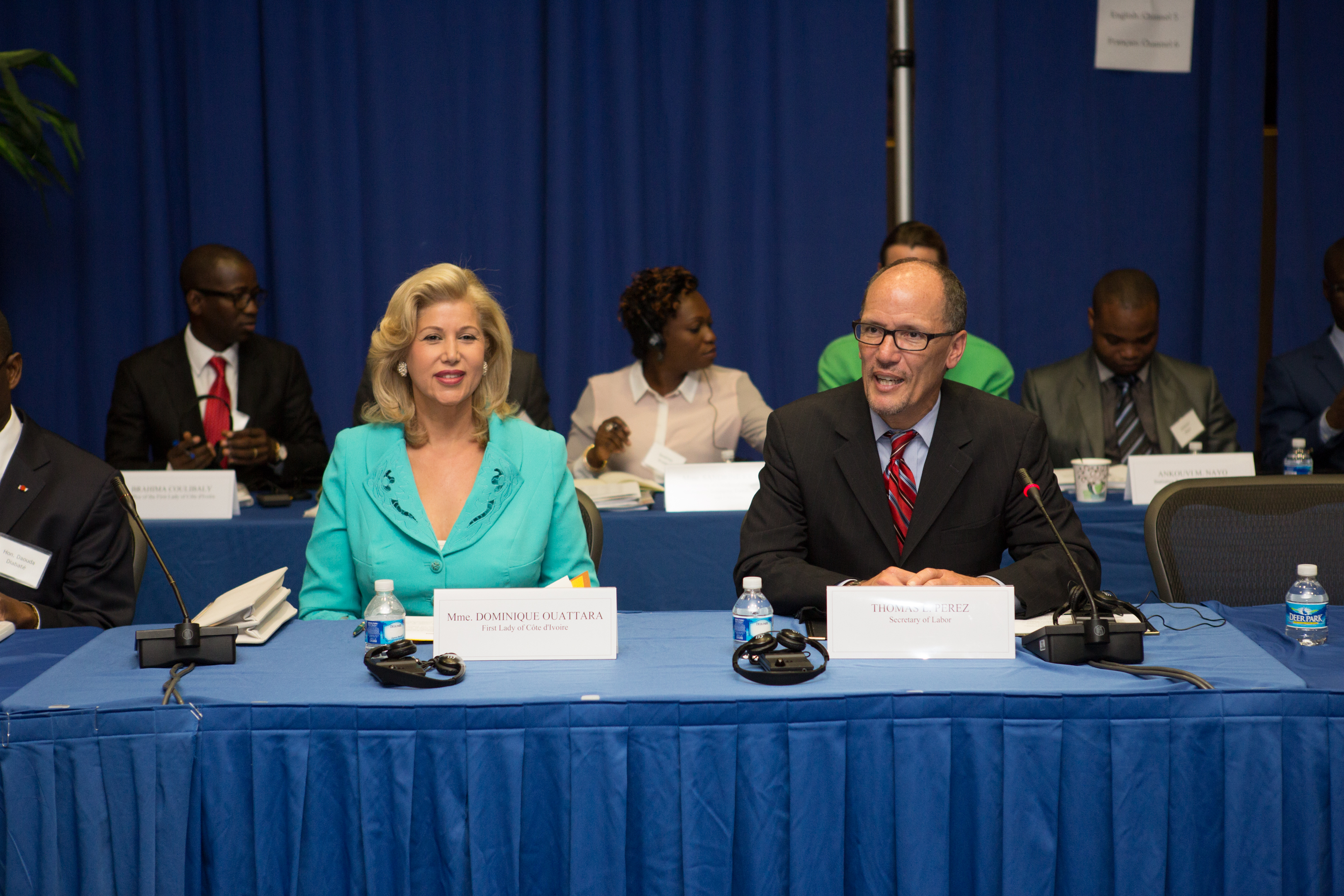
Dominique Ouattara and then US Secretary of Labor Tom Perez at ILAB Cocoa Meetings in 2015

In her capacity as Chair of the CNS, Outtara organized a conference of the First Ladies of West Africa and the Sahel region on the committee's themes.

=== Female empowerment ===
In 2012, Outtara established the Ivorian Fund for Women (FAFCI) to finance women-led micro-projects. The fund aims to facilitate women's financial empowerment, encourage entrepreneurship and address unemployment. As of April 2019, 200,000 women have received help from the fund, which currently has a capital of 12 billion FCFA. Outtara was awarded the "U.S.-Africa Business Center Outstanding Leaders' Award" from the American Chamber of Commerce in March 2016 for the help provided.

=== UNAIDS Special Ambassador ===
On 18 December 2014, Dominique Ouattara was appointed Joint United Nations Programme on HIV/AIDS Special Ambassador for the elimination of mother-to-child transmission of HIV and the promotion of pediatric treatment.

=== Other activities ===
Dominique Ouattara is a member of the Organization of African First Ladies against HIV/AIDS (OAFLA) and attended various meetings, including the 7th African Conference on Sexual Health and Rights in Accra, Ghana in February 2016. She is also a member of the African Synergy Association.

== Personal life ==
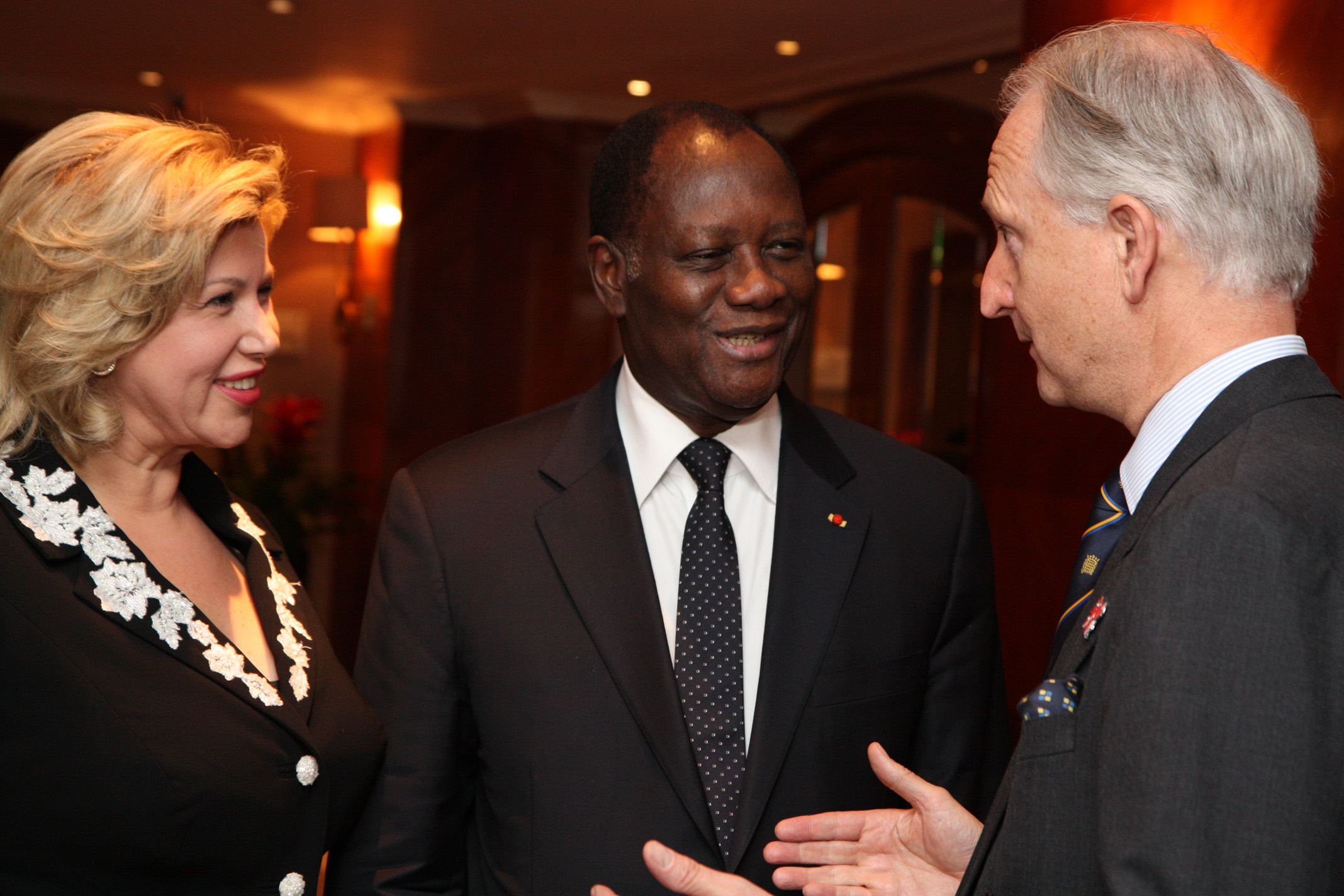
Dominique and husband Alassane Ouattara interacting with Henry Bellingham meeting 26 July 2012

Ouattara moved to the Ivory Coast in 1975 with her first husband, Jean Folloroux, who was a professor at Lycée Technique in Abidjan, and whom she had married in 1974. With him she has two children. Her husband died in 1984. Their son, Loic Folloroux, was Director of the West African branch of the Armajaro Limited group, a company specializing in trading in cocoa and raw materials. He acquired the group's French-speaking subsidiaries and then created his own company. Her daughter, Nathalie Folloroux, is program director at Canal + International.

She married Ouattara, then Deputy Governor of the BCEAO in Dakar, on August 24, 1991, in the Town Hall of the 16th arrondissement of Paris in the presence of family friends like Martin Bouygues and Jean-Christophe Mitterrand. Outtara became President of Ivory Coast in 2010 and was re-elected in 2015.

== Titles ==
- Commander of the Ivorian national order
- Officer of the Order of Merit of Solidarity
- Commander of the National Order of the Legion of Honor (France)
- Grand Cordon of the Order of Merit (Lebanon)
- Grand Cross of the Order of Merit (Portugal)

== Awards and honors ==
- 1989: "Honorary President of the Real Estate Agent Organization of Côte d’Ivoire" (CSDAIM)
- 1991: "Honorary Chairwoman of Employer’s Union of Real Estate Agents of Côte d’Ivoire" (CSDAIM)
- 2000: "Best Business Woman of the Year 2000" in the framework of The Leading Women Entrepreneurs of the World.
- 2008: " International Pan ICS Prize 2007-2008 Best Woman Prize of the best structure of Charity in West Africa for her education, training and assistance activities to destitue children and women in difficulties".
- 2009: "Officer of the Order of Merit of Solidarity" for the humanitarian actions of her foundation.
- 2011: "Crans Montana Foundation Prize", in collaboration with UNESCO and ISESCO, presented by Irina Bokova, Director-General of UNESCO.
- 2011: "Commander of the Ivorian National Order"
- 2012: "World Cocoa Foundation Prize (WCF)" in Washington, DC, for her commitment to children's welfare.
- 2012: "Commander of the National Order of the Legion of Honour" of France, presented by Nicolas Sarkozy.
- 2013: "Lebanon Grand cordon of the honour of merit"
- 2014: "UNAIDS Special Ambassador for the elimination of mother-to-child transmission and the promotion of pediatric treatment for HIV"
- 2016: "US – Africa Business Center Outstanding Leader’s award" from the American Chamber of Commerce for humanitarian action in support of women's entrepreneurship.
- 2017: "Grand Cross of the Order of Merit of the Republic of Portugal", presented by President Marcelo Rebelo de Sousa.
- 2017: "Global Impact Leadership Award" of the Center of Economic and Leadership Development for efforts to eliminate child labor and the promotion of female empowerment.
- 2018: Member of the HEC Paris Advisory Board
- 2018: "All Africa Honor Award" for women's leadership and initiatives of the Children Of Africa Foundation.
- 2019: United Nations Population Fund (UNFPA) Award, for the promotion of child protection and empowerment of women.
