= 1956 French legislative election in Ivory Coast =

Elections to the French National Assembly were held in Ivory Coast on 2 January 1956 as part of the wider parliamentary elections. The African Democratic Rally won both seats, which were taken by Félix Houphouët-Boigny and Daniel Ouezzin Coulibaly.

== Results ==
Party	Votes	%	Seats	+/–
African Democratic Rally	502,711	86.74	2	+1
Party of the French Union of Ivory Coast	39,106	6.75	0	–1
Republican Union	21,592	3.73	0	0
Ivorian Agreement for Social and Economic Progress	4,873	0.84	0	New
African Union	4,138	0.71	0	New
Nine other lists	7,130	1.23	0	–
Total	579,550	100.00	2	0
Valid votes	579,550	98.30		
Invalid/blank votes	10,037	1.70		
Total votes	589,587	100.00		
Registered voters/turnout	880,696	66.95		
Source: Sternberger et al.
