= 1952 Ivorian Territorial Assembly election =

- 30 March 1952
- All 50 seats in the Territorial Assembly; 26 seats needed for a majority
Party	Leader	Seats	+/–
PDCI–RDA	Félix Houphouët-Boigny	28	+13
UFAES		13	New
PUFCI		4	New
RPF		2	New
Others		3	New
This lists parties that won seats. See the complete results below.

Territorial Assembly elections were held in French Ivory Coast on 30 March 1952. The result was a victory for the Democratic Party of Ivory Coast – African Democratic Rally, which won 28 of the 50 seats.

== Results ==
Party	Votes	%	Seats
First College
French Union of Economic and Social Action	1,765	60.88	13
Rally of the French People	339	11.69	2
French Section of the Workers' International	40	1.38	0
Others	755	26.04	3
Total	2,899	100.00	18
Registered voters/turnout	7,885	–	
Second College
Democratic Party of Ivory Coast – African Democratic Rally	66,838	71.94	28
Party of the French Union of Ivory Coast	22,278	23.98	4
Others	3,793	4.08	0
Total	92,909	100.00	32
Registered voters/turnout	203,174	–	
Source: Sternberger et al.
