= 1970 Ivorian general election =

- 29 November 1970
- Presidential election
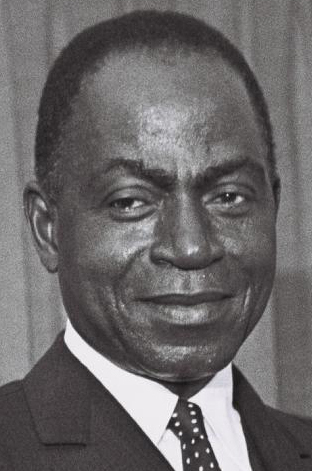
Candidate	Félix Houphouët-Boigny
Party	PDCI–RDA
Popular vote	2,003,046
Percentage	100%
- Parliamentary election
- All 100 seats in the National Assembly; 51 seats needed for a majority
- Turnout: 98.99%
Party	Vote %	Seats	+/–
PDCI–RDA	100	100	+15
This lists parties that won seats. See the complete results below.

General elections were held in Ivory Coast on 29 November 1970 to elect a President and National Assembly. At the time the country was a one-party state with the Democratic Party of Ivory Coast – African Democratic Rally (PDCI-RDA) as the sole legal party. Its leader Félix Houphouët-Boigny was elected president unopposed, whilst in the National Assembly election, a list of 100 PDCI-RDA candidates (chosen from 650 applicants by the party's executive authorities) for the 100 seats (increased from 85 at the previous elections) was presented to the electorate for approval. Voter turnout was reported to be 98.9% in the parliamentary election and 99.2% in the presidential election.

== Results ==
=== President ===
Candidate	Party	Votes	%
Félix Houphouët-Boigny	Democratic Party of Ivory Coast	2,003,046	100.00
Total		2,003,046	100.00
Valid votes		2,003,046	99.97
Invalid/blank votes		668	0.03
Total votes		2,003,714	100.00
Registered voters/turnout		2,020,000	99.19
Source: Nohlen et al.

=== National Assembly ===
Party	Votes	%	Seats	+/–
Democratic Party of Ivory Coast	1,997,560	100.00	100	+15
Total	1,997,560	100.00	100	+15
Valid votes	1,997,560	99.90		
Invalid/blank votes	2,083	0.10		
Total votes	1,999,643	100.00		
Registered voters/turnout	2,020,000	98.99		
Source: Nohlen et al.
