= The Sixth Child =

2022 French drama film

- Theatrical release poster
- French: Le Sixième Enfant
- Directed by: Léopold Legrand
- Screenplay by: Léopold Legrand; Catherine Paillé
- Based on: Pleurer des rivières by Alain Jaspard
- Produced by: Frédéric Brillion; Gilles Legrand
- Starring: Sara Giraudeau; Benjamin Lavernhe; Damien Bonnard; Judith Chemla
- Cinematography: Julien Ramirez Hernan
- Edited by: Catherine Schwartz
- Music by: Louis Sclavis
- Production companies: Epithète & Co; France 2 Cinéma
- Distributed by: Pyramide Distribution
- Release dates: 24 August 2022 (Angoulême); 28 September 2022 (France)
- Running time: 92 minutes
- Country: France
- Language: French
- Box office: $488,792

The Sixth Child (French: Le Sixième Enfant) is a 2022 French drama film directed by Léopold Legrand in his feature debut, and co-written by Legrand and Catherine Paillé. The film is loosely based on the 2018 novel Pleurer des rivières by Alain Jaspard. It stars Sara Giraudeau, Benjamin Lavernhe, Damien Bonnard and Judith Chemla. It had its world premiere at the Angoulême Francophone Film Festival on 24 August 2022. It was released in France on 28 September 2022.

== Synopsis ==
Franck and Meriem, a Roma couple, have five children and live in a caravan in Aubervilliers. Franck works as scrap dealer and struggles to earn enough income to support their family. Anna and Julien, both lawyers, are a couple who are unable to have children. One night, Franck unwittingly helps resell stolen scrap metal and, following a road accident, he loses his work van and finds himself accused of theft and risking a prison sentence. Julien successfully defends Franck in court, obtaining a suspended sentence. Julien also has his license revoked. Anna therefore comes to pick him up at the court and ends up driving Franck home. They discover his large family and their precarious living situation.

Shortly thereafter, Franck visits Julien at his office. He explains to him that Meriem is two months pregnant and that their religious convictions forbid abortion, but that they cannot afford to welcome a sixth child. Franck has debts and needs to buy a van. He and his wife believe that Julien and Anna would make good parents, and that in exchange, the couple could help them to get out of their difficult financial circumstance.

== Cast ==
- Sara Giraudeau as Anna
- Benjamin Lavernhe as Julien
- Damien Bonnard as Franck
- Judith Chemla as Meriem
- Marie-Christine Orry as Meriem's mother
- Olivier Rabourdin as Martin
- Naidra Ayadi as Judge

== Production ==
The Sixth Child was produced by Frédéric Brillion and Gilles Legrand on behalf of Epithète Films in co-production with France 2 Cinéma. Filming took place from 12 April 2021 to 28 May 2021 in Paris.

== Release ==
The film had its world premiere at the 15th Angoulême Francophone Film Festival on 24 August 2022. The film was theatrically released in France on 28 September 2022 by Pyramide Distribution.

== Reception ==
=== Critical response ===
The Sixth Child received an average rating of 3.8 out of 5 stars on the French website AlloCiné, based on 27 reviews.

=== Accolades ===
Award	Date of ceremony	Category	Recipient(s)	Result	Ref.
Angoulême Francophone Film Festival	28 August 2022	Valois du meilleur scénario	Léopold Legrand and Catherine Paillé	Won	
Angoulême Francophone Film Festival	28 August 2022	Valois de la meilleure actrice	Sara Giraudeau and Judith Chemla	Won	
Angoulême Francophone Film Festival	28 August 2022	Valois du public	The Sixth Child	Won	
Angoulême Francophone Film Festival	28 August 2022	Valois de la musique du film	Louis Sclavis	Won	
César Awards	24 February 2023	Best First Film	The Sixth Child	Nominated	
César Awards	24 February 2023	Best Supporting Actress	Judith Chemla	Nominated	
Lumière Awards	16 January 2023	Best First Film	The Sixth Child	Won	
