= 1957 Ivorian Territorial Assembly election =

- 31 March 1957
- All 60 seats in the Territorial Assembly; 31 seats needed for a majority
- Turnout: 51.48%
Party	Leader	Vote %	Seats	+/–
PDCI–RDA	Félix Houphouët-Boigny	89.28	58	+30
PDCI-RDA dissidents	–	2.29	2	New
This lists parties that won seats. See the complete results below.

Territorial Assembly elections were held in French Ivory Coast on 31 March 1957. The result was a victory for the Democratic Party of Ivory Coast – African Democratic Rally (PCDI–RDA), which won 58 of the 60 seats. The other two seats were won by PCDI–RDA dissidents.

== Results ==
Party	Votes	%	Seats	+/–
Democratic Party of Ivory Coast	720,828	89.28	58	+30
African Socialist Movement	19,125	2.37	0	New
PCDI–RDA dissidents	18,452	2.29	2	New
Others	48,965	6.06	0	–
Total	807,370	100.00	60	+10
Valid votes	807,370	99.08		
Invalid/blank votes	7,525	0.92		
Total votes	814,895	100.00		
Registered voters/turnout	1,582,862	51.48		
Source: Sternberger et al.
