= Woubi Chéri =

- 2013 region 2 PAL DVD cover
- Directed by: Laurent Bocahut; Philip Brooks
- Edited by: Nadia Ben Rachid
- Release date: 1998
- Running time: 62 minutes
- Countries: France; Côte d'Ivoire
- Language: French

Woubi Chéri (English: Darling Woubi) is a 1998 French/Ivorian documentary that shows a few days in the life of various members of the queer community in Abidjan, Côte d'Ivoire. At the time of its release, it was one of the few films from Africa to deal with LGBT issues. While there is a sentiment held amongst indigenous Africans as a result of Western imperialism, colonialism, and Abrahamic imposition that queerness is foreign or non-African, this film argues against the heteronormative insistence within the continent.

== Film content ==
Featured terminology*
Term	Definition
Woubi	A feminine gay man
Yossi	A masculine bisexual man
Toussou Bakari	A gay woman; a lesbian
Controus	Someone who is homophobic/transphobic

*As this film came out in the 90s, two terms that were also prominent were transvestite & transexual. While considered a largely outdated (some older generation gender-queer people still self-identifying as such), the documentary has active & reoccuring usage of said terms. This will be reflected when describing the people and things said in the community in this specific case of examining the film.

=== Cast ===
Each cast member is given their share of screentime dedication to tell their story, explain their relationship to their gender and/or sexuality, and how they place themselves in the community.

- Barbara
- Vincent
- Avelido
- Laurent
- Jean-Jacques
- Sostène
- Bibiche
- Tatiana

=== Organization and activism ===
==== Ivory Coast Transvestite Association (ICTA) ====
Among the transvestite community in Cote d'Ivoire, they arranged and set up an association. A proposition of what would become the Ivory Coast Transvestite Association (ICTA; also known as L’association des Travestis de Côte d’Ivoire in French). Barbara became appointed president of the ICTA and Tatiana became general secretary. They discussed amongst themselves where would be the best location to hold meetings that would be good for both partying conditions and safety from people who may cause them harm.

==== Parties and riots ====
The first party held on December 27th, 1997, didn't go well, as journalists intruded and exposed the association in the local papers. This, in turn, caused participants to fear attending more meetings. The members brought up complaints all the way up to the Minister of Communications about having their privacy exposed, but they were met with a lack of care for their situation. Despite this, their will for unapologetically living freely persisted in their efforts to be themselves openly. Barbara expresses a readiness to protect (physically and spiritually) the pursuit of happiness among the community, educates those who may have questions or don't fully understand, and offer persistent celebration of being able to live her truth everyday. In retaliation, community members of the ICTA would assault invasive journalists and damage the property of the offices the newspapers were developed.

== Reception ==
The film won Best Documentary awards at the New York Lesbian, Gay, Bisexual, & Transgender Film Festival, the Lovers Film Festival – Torino LGBTQI Visions, and the Transgender Festival in London.

== See also ==
- Dakan — a 1997 Guinean drama film dealing with homosexuality
- Forbidden Fruit — a 2000 Zimbabwean film about a lesbian relationship
