= 1960 Ivorian general election =

- 27 November 1960
- Presidential election
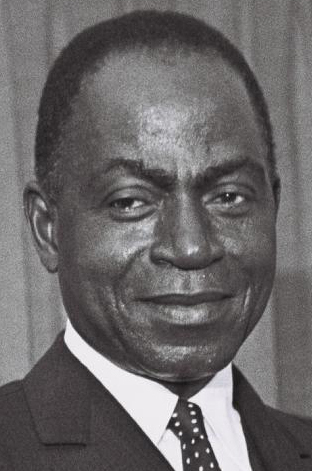
Candidate	Félix Houphouët-Boigny
Party	PDCI–RDA
Popular vote	1,641,352
Percentage	100%
- Parliamentary election
- All 70 seats in the National Assembly; 36 seats needed for a majority
- Turnout: 95.87%
Party	Vote %	Seats	+/–
PDCI–RDA	100	70	−30
This lists parties that won seats. See the complete results below.

General elections were held in Ivory Coast on 27 November 1960 to elect a President and National Assembly. Under the constitution enacted that year, the country was officially a one-party state with the Democratic Party of Ivory Coast – African Democratic Rally (PDCI-RDA) as the sole legal party. Its leader, Félix Houphouët-Boigny, was automatically elected to a five-year term as president and unanimously confirmed in office via a referendum. A single list of PDCI-RDA candidates won all 70 seats in the National Assembly. Voter turnout was 95.9% in the parliamentary election and 98.8% in the presidential election.

== Results ==
=== President ===
Candidate	Party	Votes	%
Félix Houphouët-Boigny	Democratic Party of Ivory Coast	1,641,352	100.00
Total		1,641,352	100.00
Valid votes		1,641,352	99.99
Invalid/blank votes		190	0.01
Total votes		1,641,542	100.00
Registered voters/turnout		1,661,833	98.78
Source: Nohlen et al.

=== National Assembly ===
Party	Votes	%	Seats	+/–
Democratic Party of Ivory Coast	1,586,518	100.00	70	–30
Total	1,586,518	100.00	70	–30
Valid votes	1,586,518	99.58		
Invalid/blank votes	6,617	0.42		
Total votes	1,593,135	100.00		
Registered voters/turnout	1,661,833	95.87		
Source: Nohlen et al.
