= 1985 Ivorian parliamentary election =

- 10 November 1985
- All 175 seats in the National Assembly; 88 seats needed for a majority
- Turnout: 45.67%
Party	Leader	Vote %	Seats	+/–
PDCI–RDA	Félix Houphouët-Boigny	100	175	+28
This lists parties that won seats. See the complete results below.

Parliamentary elections were held in Ivory Coast on 10 November 1985. At the time the country was a one-party state with the Democratic Party of Ivory Coast – African Democratic Rally (PDCI-RDA) as the sole legal party. 546 PDCI-RDA candidates contested the 175 seats (up from 147 at the previous election). Voter turnout was reported to be just 46%.

== Results ==
Party	Votes	%	Seats	+/–
Democratic Party of Ivory Coast			175	+28
Total			175	+28
Total votes	1,606,332	–		
Registered voters/turnout	3,517,259	45.67		
Source: Nohlen et al.
