= 1946–47 Ivorian General Council election =

- December 1946; 5 January 1947
- All 30 seats in the General Council
Party	Leader	Seats
PDCI–RDA	Félix Houphouët-Boigny	15
National Union		13
Filidori List	Antoine Filidori	6
URDIESCI		1
Independents	–	6
This lists parties that won seats. See the complete results below.

General Council elections were held in French Ivory Coast (which included Upper Volta at the time) in December 1946 and 5 January 1947. The Democratic Party of Ivory Coast – African Democratic Rally won all 15 seats in the Second College in Ivory Coast, and 24 of the 30 Second College seats overall.

== Results ==
Party	First round			Second round			Total seats
Party	Votes	%	Seats	Votes	%	Seats	Total seats
First College
National Union			5			8	13
Filidori List			0			6	6
URDIESCI			0			1	1
Total			5			15	20
Total votes	2,069	–					
Registered voters/turnout	4,449	46.50					
Second College
Democratic Party of Ivory Coast			24				24
Independents			6				6
Total			30				30
Total votes	132,848	–					
Registered voters/turnout	209,325	63.46					
Source: De Benoist

== Aftermath ==
When Upper Volta was reconstituted as a separate territory in 1948, its members left the General Council (10 from the First College, 15 from the Second). By-elections were held in May 1948 for eight First College seats and 12 Second College seats; the PDCI won all of the Second College seats.
