= African Agricultural Union =

First quasi-political party in Côte d'Ivoire

The African Agricultural Union (French: Syndicat agricole africain, SAA) was the first quasi-political party in Côte d'Ivoire, led by Félix Houphouët-Boigny throughout its existence. It was established on 3 September 1944 by Houphouët-Boigny and the colonial administration.

== History ==
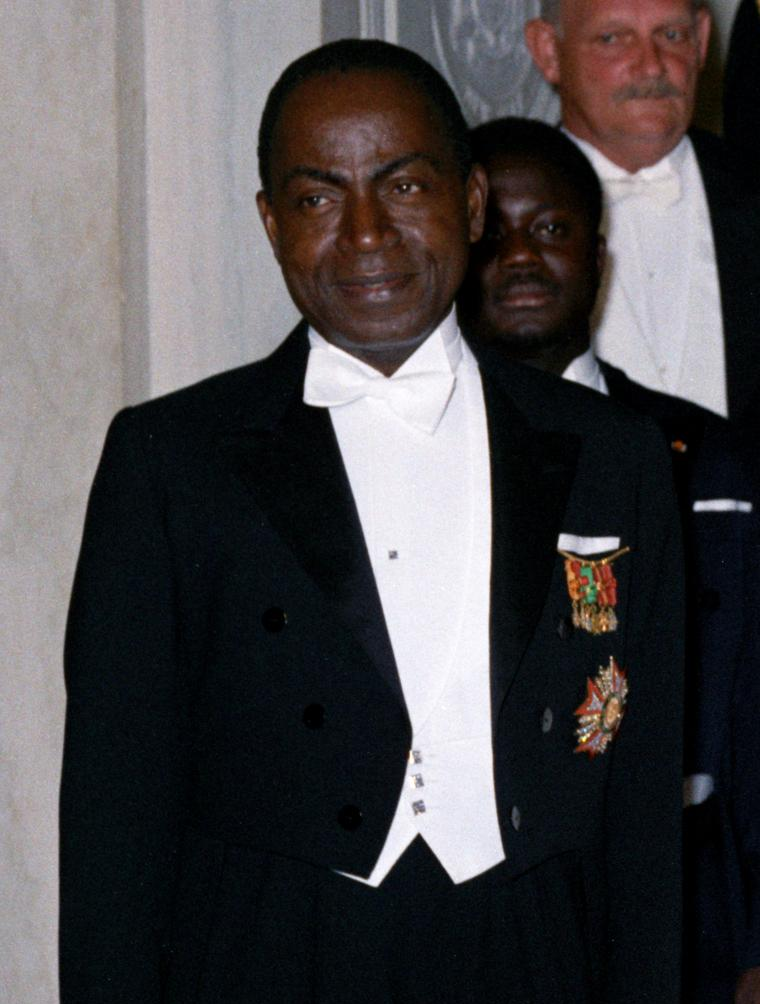
Felix Houphouët-Boigny

The SAA was established on 3 September 1944 by Houphouët-Boigny and the colonial administration at an inaugural meeting in Abidjan. Under his presidency, it brought together African farmers who were dissatisfied with their paychecks and worked to protect their interests against those of European settlers. Anti-colonialist and anti-racist, the organisation demanded better working conditions, higher wages, and the abolition of unfree labour. The union quickly received the support of nearly 20,000 plantation workers. Its success irritated the colonists to the extent that they took legal action against Houphouët. However, the SAA increased his popularity as the voice of the Africans.

When elected to the assemblée constituante on 4 November 1945, Houphouët-Boigny worked to implement the wishes of the SAA. He proposed a bill to abolish forced labour, the single most unpopular feature of French rule, on 1 March 1946 which the Assembly adopted in 1947. On 9 April 1946, Houphouët-Boigny, with the help of the Groupes d'études communistes d'Abidjan, recreated the SAA as the Democratic Party of Côte d'Ivoire (PDCI), the first effective party in Côte d'Ivoire and the Ivorian section of the African Democratic Rally.
