= 1990 Ivorian presidential election =

- 28 October 1990
- Turnout: 69.16%
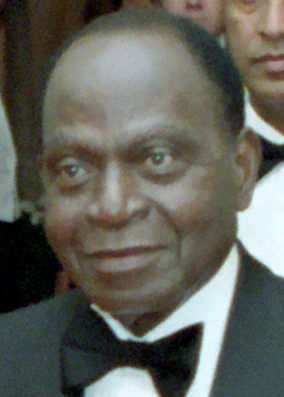

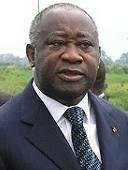
Candidate	Félix Houphouët-Boigny	Laurent Gbagbo
Party	PDCI–RDA	FPI
Popular vote	2,445,365	548,441
Percentage	81.68%	18.32%
President before election
Félix Houphouët-Boigny
PDCI–RDA
Elected President
Félix Houphouët-Boigny
PDCI–RDA

Presidential elections were held in Ivory Coast on 28 October 1990. They were the first multi-candidate presidential election in Ivorian history. Opposition parties were legalized by authoritarian leader Félix Houphouët-Boigny, on 3 May 1990. For the first time, Félix Houphouët-Boigny, president since independence in 1960, faced an opponent in longtime dissident Laurent Gbagbo, who had just returned from exile two years earlier. In an election married by violence and allegations of cheating and ballot stuffing, Houphouët-Boigny was elected to a seventh five-year term, receiving 82% of the vote. Voter turnout was 69%.

Houphouët-Boigny died on 7 December 1993, three years into his term. In line with the constitution, National Assembly president Henri Konan Bédié served as acting president for the remainder of Houphouët-Boigny's term. Bédié was elected president in his own right in 1995.

== Results ==
Candidate	Party	Votes	%
Félix Houphouët-Boigny	Democratic Party of Ivory Coast – African Democratic Rally	2,445,365	81.68
Laurent Gbagbo	Ivorian Popular Front	548,441	18.32
Total		2,993,806	100.00
Valid votes		2,993,806	98.19
Invalid/blank votes		55,327	1.81
Total votes		3,049,133	100.00
Registered voters/turnout		4,408,808	69.16
Source: Nohlen et al.
