= Progressive Party of Ivory Coast =

Ivorian political party

The Progressive Party of Ivory Coast (French: Parti Progressiste de Côte d'Ivoire) was a pro-France political party in Ivory Coast.

== History ==
The party was established in 1946 as a successor to the Patriotic Action Committee of Ivory Coast (Comité d'Action Patriotique de la Côte d'Ivoire, CAPACI), which had supported Kouamé Benzème in the French National Assembly elections in 1945. The main leaders of the PPCI were Kacou Aoulou, Joseph Coffi, Julien Yacobi and Etty Arthur.

In 1951 PPCI merged with Entente of Independents of Côte d'Ivoire (EDICI) to form the Party of the French Union of Côte d'Ivoire (PUFCI).
