= 1959 Ivorian parliamentary election =

- 12 April 1959
- All 100 seats in the Legislative Assembly; 51 seats needed for a majority
Party	Leader	Vote %	Seats	+/–
PDCI–RDA	Félix Houphouët-Boigny	100	100	+42
This lists parties that won seats. See the complete results below.

Parliamentary elections were held in Ivory Coast on 12 April 1959 as a prelude to independence the next year. The Democratic Party of Ivory Coast – African Democratic Rally was the only party to contest the election, thereby winning all 100 seats. Voter turnout was 94.7%.

== Results ==
Party	Votes	%	Seats	+/–
Democratic Party of Ivory Coast	1,522,324	100.00	100	+40
Total	1,522,324	100.00	100	+40
Valid votes	1,522,324	99.92		
Invalid/blank votes	1,256	0.08		
Total votes	1,523,580	100.00		
Registered voters/turnout	1,609,345	94.67		
Source: Nohlen et al.
