= 1984 United States elections =

- ← 1982 1983 1984 1985 1986 → Presidential election year
- Election day: November 6
- Incumbent president: ▌Ronald Reagan (R)
- Next Congress: 99th

Presidential election
- Partisan control: Republican hold
- Popular vote margin: Republican +18.2%
- Electoral vote
- Ronald Reagan (R): 525
- Walter Mondale (D): 13
- 1984 presidential election results. Red denotes states won by Reagan, blue denotes states won by Mondale. Numbers indicate the electoral votes won by each candidate.

Senate elections
- Overall control: Republican hold
- Seats contested: 33 of 100 seats
- Net seat change: Democratic +2
- 1984 Senate results Democratic gain Democratic hold Republican gain Republican hold

House elections
- Overall control: Democratic hold
- Seats contested: All 435 voting members
- Popular vote margin: Democratic +5.1%
- Net seat change: Republican +16
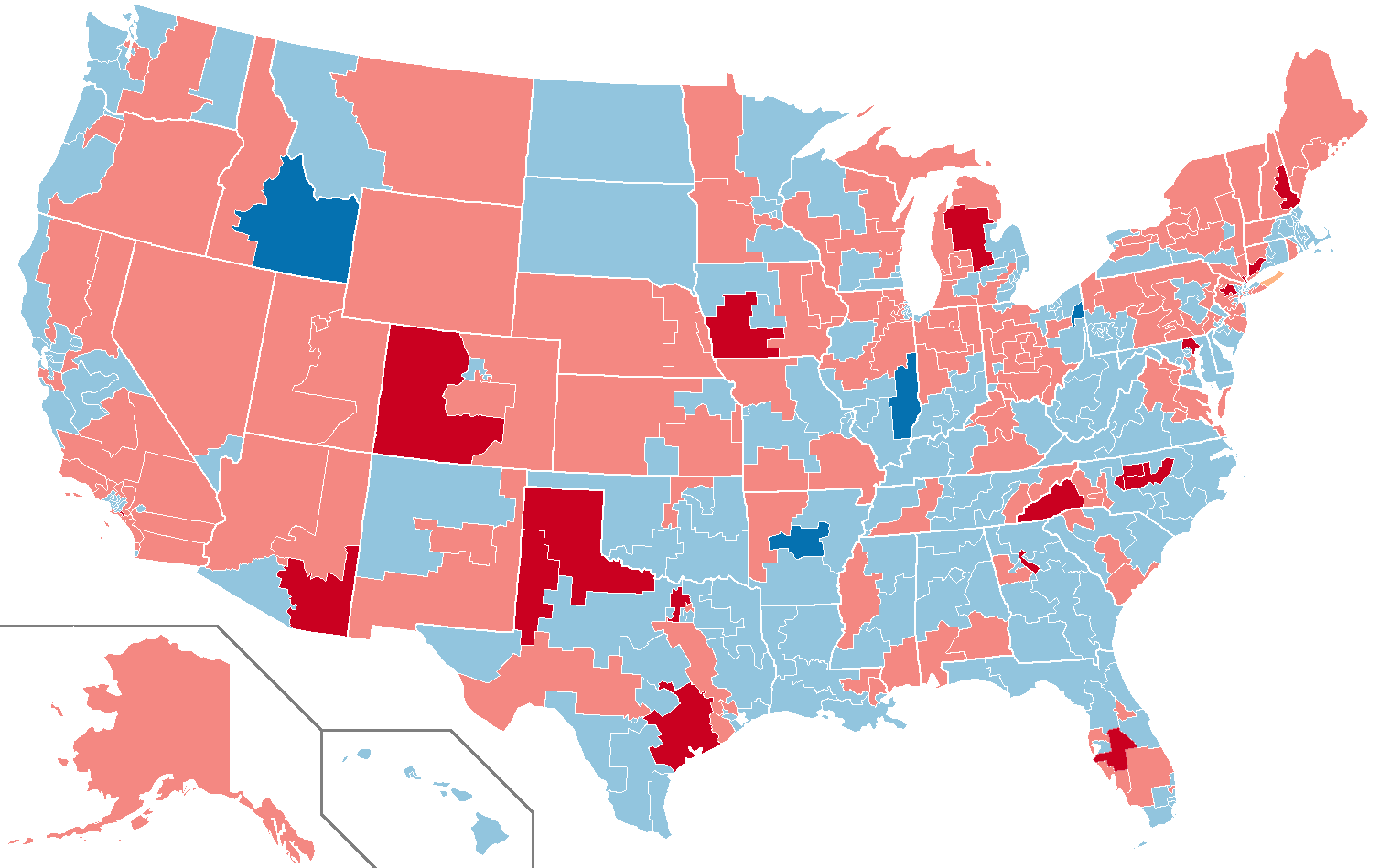
- 1984 House of Representatives results Democratic gain Democratic hold Republican gain Republican hold

Gubernatorial elections
- Seats contested: 15 (13 states, 2 territories)
- Net seat change: Republican +1
- 1984 gubernatorial election results Territorial races not shown Democratic gain Democratic hold Republican gain Republican hold

Elections were held on November 6, 1984, and elected the members of the 99th United States Congress. Republicans won a landslide victory in the presidential election, picked up seats in the House of Representatives, and successfully defended their Senate majority.

Republican incumbent President Ronald Reagan won re-election, defeating Democratic former Vice President Walter Mondale. Reagan carried every state except for Washington, D.C., and Mondale's home state of Minnesota; won 58.8 percent of the popular vote; and defeated Mondale by a popular vote margin of eighteen points. Reagan remains the only presidential candidate since Richard Nixon in 1972 to win at least 55 percent of the popular vote and win by a margin greater than 10 points.

Mondale defeated Colorado Senator Gary Hart and Reverend Jesse Jackson of Illinois to take the Democratic nomination. Mondale selected New York Congresswoman Geraldine Ferraro as his running mate, making Ferraro the first woman to appear on a major party presidential ticket.

Democrats picked up two Senate seats, bringing their total to 47 out of 100 seats. Democrats won the nationwide popular vote for the House of Representatives by a margin of 5.1 percentage points and retained their majority, though Republicans picked up a total of sixteen seats. The party makeup of both chambers of Congress following this election cycle, in which the Democrats had control of the House and the Republicans had control of the Senate, would not be emulated until 2018. In the gubernatorial elections, the Republicans won a net of one seat.

== See also ==
- 1984 United States presidential election
- 1984 United States House of Representatives elections
- 1984 United States Senate elections
- 1984 United States gubernatorial elections
