= Étienne Djaument =

Ivorian politician

Étienne Djaument (11 November 1911 - 15 January 1989) was an Ivorian politician who was elected to the French Senate in 1947.

He was a member of the Groupe de l'Union Républicaine et Résistante pour l'Union Française, affiliated with the French Communist Party. Later Djaument became the president of the Eburnean Democratic Bloc.

In 1961 he was named Ivorian ambassador to Nigeria.
