= 1945 French legislative election in Ivory Coast =

Elections to the French National Assembly were held in the territory of Ivory Coast (which included Upper Volta at the time) on 21 October 1945, with a second round on 4 November as part of the wider parliamentary elections. Voting was carried out using separate electoral colleges for citizens and non-citizens. François Reste de Roca and Félix Houphouët-Boigny were elected.

== Background ==
In September 1944 African planters formed the African Agricultural Union (SAA) as a result of government policy that allowed them to be drafted as forced labour and their plantations destroyed based on allegations of infections with plant disease (although the real reason was that they were competing too successfully for the liking of European plantation owners). The union was led by Félix Houphouët-Boigny, and received support from the colony's administrators, resulting its members being exempted from forced labour. However, this went down badly with the European planters, who successfully lobbied the French government to remove Governor André Latrille and replace him with Henry Jean Marie de Mauduit, who was more sympathetic to their views.

Ivory Coast's capital Abidjan had been given the status of "commune mixte of the second degree" in 1939, introducing elections for a town council. However, they were delayed due to World War II, and were held for the first time on 26 August 1945. Although not a political party, the SAA was the most prominent African organisation in the territory and an African Bloc was formed around it to contest the elections, putting forward an exclusively African candidate list. Despite attempts by Europeans to get the elections postponed or boycotted, the Bloc went on to win the elections, as no Africans were willing to stand against them.

== Campaign ==
The Bloc sought to secure a similar outcome for the second college elections to the National Assembly, but could not agree on a candidate. Intellectuals in Abidjan supported Kouamé Binzème, whilst SAA members backed Houphouët-Boigny. Binzème eventually contested the elections with the support of the Patriotic Action Committee of Ivory Coast.

Houphouët-Boigny attempted to court the support of Mogho Naba Saba II, king of the Mossi. However, the Mossi were keen to regain separate status for Upper Volta, which the French had merged into Ivory Coast in 1932. As a result, they formed the Voltaic Union under encouragement from Governor Mauduit, and possibly under pressure from the Governor, the Mogho Naba put forward his "Baloum Naba" (chief of the pages), Tenga Ouedraogo, as a candidate. However, Houphouët-Boigny did gain the support of the Bobo, who disliked the Mossi.

As a result, Houphouët-Boigny drew most of his support from Ivory Coast, whilst Tenga Ouedraogo's support was concentrated in Upper Volta. Despite not being able to speak French, Tenga Ouedraogo's campaign received the full support of the colonial administration, who were seeking to prevent Houphouët-Boigny winning. However, it was claimed that Tenga Ouedraogo advised voters not to vote for him due to his lack of French education.

== Results ==
Houphouët-Boigny won the second college vote largely due to the strong organisation of the SAA in the south of Ivory Coast and the support of the Bobo.

=== First College ===
Candidate	Party	First round		Second round	
Candidate	Party	Votes	%	Votes	%
François Reste de Roca	Radical-Socialist Party	785	27.15	1,821	65.65
Richard-Édmond-Maurice-Édouard Brunot	SFIO	628	21.72	952	34.32
Peraldi	Independent	428	14.80		
André Schock	Independent	339	11.73	1	0.04
Auguste Denis	Independent	268	9.27		
Georges Maniglier		215	7.44		
Marceau Somon		142	4.91		
Pierre-Henri Chipeau		77	2.66		
De Fournier		7	0.24		
Johannés Besson		2	0.07		
Abdoulaye Ndiaye		0	0.00	0	0.00
Total		2,891	100.00	2,774	100.00
Valid votes		2,891	96.82	2,774	99.00
Invalid/blank votes		95	3.18	28	1.00
Total votes		2,986	100.00	2,802	100.00
Registered voters/turnout		3,938	75.83	3,938	71.15
Source: De Benoist

=== Second College ===
Candidate	Party	First round		Second round	
Candidate	Party	Votes	%	Votes	%
Félix Houphouët-Boigny	African Agricultural Union	12,680	49.86	12,980	50.71
Tenga Ouedraogo	Voltaic Union	9,716	38.21	11,621	45.40
Tidiane Dem	Union of Tradespeople	998	3.92	611	2.39
Kouamé Binzème	Progressive Party of Ivory Coast	729	2.87	243	0.95
Pierre Carrieu		366	1.44		
Sanoussi Ouattara		275	1.08		
Maurice Sillaret		207	0.81	63	0.25
Georges Tourot		205	0.81	38	0.15
Amadou Diop		128	0.50		
Alphonse Boni		107	0.42		
Charles Nignan		8	0.03		
Godard		8	0.03	8	0.03
Sanny Sanon		1	0.00		
Adrien Dignan Bailly		1	0.00	2	0.01
Georges Maniglier				29	0.11
Sanoussi Ouattara				1	0.00
Total		25,429	100.00	25,596	100.00
Valid votes		25,429	98.43	25,596	99.39
Invalid/blank votes		406	1.57	157	0.61
Total votes		25,835	100.00	25,753	100.00
Registered voters/turnout		31,384	82.32	31,384	82.06
Source: Sternberger, Annals of the University of Abidjan

== Aftermath ==
Following the elections, Senegalese MP Lamine Guèye attempted to persuade all the African MPs to form an African Bloc, which would be affiliated with the SFIO. However, the attempt failed, and Houphouët-Boigny joined the MUR.
