= 1980 Ivorian presidential election =

- 12 October 1980
- Turnout: 82.27%
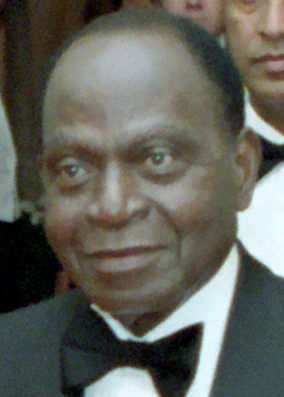
Candidate	Félix Houphouët-Boigny
Party	PDCI–RDA
Popular vote	2,795,150
Percentage	100%
President before election
Félix Houphouët-Boigny
PDCI–RDA
Elected President
Félix Houphouët-Boigny
PDCI–RDA

Presidential elections were held in Ivory Coast on 12 October 1980, the first time a presidential election had been held separately to National Assembly elections. At the time the country was a one-party state with the Democratic Party of Ivory Coast – African Democratic Rally as the sole legal party. Its leader, long-term President Félix Houphouët-Boigny was the only candidate, and was re-elected unopposed. Voter turnout was 82%.

== Results ==
Candidate	Party	Votes	%
Félix Houphouët-Boigny	Democratic Party of Ivory Coast – African Democratic Rally	2,795,150	100.00
Total		2,795,150	100.00
Valid votes		2,795,150	99.99
Invalid/blank votes		306	0.01
Total votes		2,795,456	100.00
Registered voters/turnout		3,398,056	82.27
Source: Nohlen et al.
