= Simone Gbagbo =

Ivorian politician (born 1949)

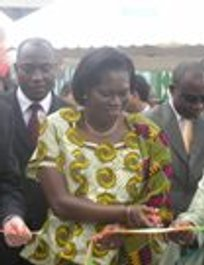
- Gbagbo in 2006

First Lady of Ivory Coast
- In role 26 October 2000 – 11 April 2011
- Preceded by: Rose Doudou Guéï
- Succeeded by: Dominique Folloroux-Ouattara

Personal details
- Born: Simone Ehivet; 20 June 1949 (age 77) Moossou, Grand-Bassam, French West Africa
- Party: Ivorian Popular Front
- Spouse: Laurent Gbagbo
- Children: 5

Simone Ehivet Gbagbo (born 20 June 1949) is an Ivorian politician. She is the president of the Parliamentary Group of the Ivorian Popular Front (FPI) and is a vice-president of the FPI. As the wife of Laurent Gbagbo, the President of Côte d'Ivoire from 2000 to 2011, she was also First Lady of Ivory Coast prior to their arrest by pro-Ouattara forces.

== Biography ==
Born in 1949 in Moossou, Grand-Bassam as Simone Ehivet, the daughter of Jean Ehivet, a local police officer, and Marie Djaha, Simone Gbagbo trained as a historian and earned a third cycle doctorate in oral literature. She worked in applied linguistics as a Marxist labor union leader and been nicknamed in the Ivorian press as the "Hillary Clinton des tropiques". The mother of five daughters, the last two with her current husband, Laurent Gbagbo, she participated in the teachers' strike movement of 1982. Simone and Laurent Gbagbo, before their marriage, co-founded the clandestine political group which later became known as the FPI. She was an active trades union militant back in the 1970s, she was imprisoned several times during the struggle for multi-party elections.

Following the introduction of multiparty elections, Gbagbo and her husband were arrested for allegedly inciting violence in February 1992 and spent six months in prison. In 1996, she became an FPI Deputy from Abobo (part of Abidjan) in the National Assembly. In 1998, she became an evangelical Christian after surviving a car accident.

Re-elected to the National Assembly as an FPI Deputy from Abobo in the December 2000 parliamentary election, Gbagbo is also President of the FPI Parliamentary Group. At the FPI's Third Extraordinary Congress, held from 20 to 22 July 2001, she was elected as the Second Vice-President of the FPI.

== Controversy ==
Simone Gbagbo is a controversial figure in Côte d'Ivoire. Involved in nationalist politics surrounding the Ivorian Civil War, in 2005 Radio France International reported that she was being investigated by the United Nations for human rights abuses, including organising death squads.

=== The Kieffer Affair ===
In July 2008 she was formally called for questioning by a French investigative judge, examining the April 2004 disappearance and presumed death in Abidjan of French-Canadian journalist Guy-André Kieffer. Kieffer was in Abidjan at the time, researching a story on political corruption and government involvement in the Ivorian Cocoa industry. He was last seen on the way to a meeting with Michel Legré, the brother-in-law of Simone Gbagbo. French judicial officials have arrested and are investigating Jean-Tony Oulaï, a former member of the Ivorian Secret Services, whom they detained in Paris in 2006. Jean-Tony Oulaï's driver at the time Berté Seydou, as well as Kieffer's brother, have alleged that Gbagbo and former Ivorian Minister of Planning and Development Paul-Antoine Bohoun Bouabré have knowledge of the events surrounding Kieffer's death, and that Oulaï is responsible.

Legré was arrested in Abidjan in 2004 on suspicion of kidnapping and murder, but was provisionally released in 2005 and has since fled the country—or is in an unknown location. In April 2009, Simone Gbagbo was interviewed by two French magistrates concerning the Kieffer case. The AFP reported that the magistrates consider Legré, who they have in custody, their "chief suspect" and that neither the President nor Gbagbo "are suspected of being directly linked with Kieffer's disappearance." The French also planned interviews with Gbagbo's security chief Seka Yapo Anselme and Planning Minister Paul-Antoine Bohoun Bouabre. She filed a defamation lawsuit against Jean-Tony Oulaï regarding his charges against her.

== Political activity since 2008 ==
In September 2008, Gbagbo engaged in a two-week tour of the central part of the country, concluding the tour on 14 September in the city of Bouaké. She rallied support for her husband's candidacy in the forthcoming presidential election during this tour and urged participation in the voter identification process.

In the 2010–2011 Ivorian crisis, Laurent Gbagbo and Alassane Ouattara disputed the results of the 2010 presidential election. The crisis ended with the arrest of Laurent and Simone Gbagbo by pro-Ouattara forces on 11 April 2011. Simone Gbagbo was subsequently held under house arrest.

On 22 November 2012, a warrant was unsealed by the International Criminal Court (ICC) for Simone Gbagbo's arrest for crimes against humanity. The Court alleged that as a member of her husband's inner circle, she "played a central role in post-election violence". Amnesty International called on the Ivorian government to immediately transfer her to the custody of the ICC. The government refused to do so, and Gbagbo was judged by an Ivorian court.

On 10 March 2015, Simone Gbagbo was sentenced to 20 years in jail for crimes against humanity. Two years later, in March 2017, she was acquitted by Ivorian court of war crimes and crimes against humanity charges, connected to her role in the 2011 political violence. She was pardoned under an amnesty by Ivorian President Alassane Ouattara on 7 August 2018 after serving 3 of her 20-year sentence. The amnesty was a general one and included other members of her party.

On November 30, 2024, she was designated as the candidate of her party, the Movement of Capable Generations (MGC), for the nomination for the 2025 presidential election.
