= Youth of the African Democratic Rally of Ivory Coast =

The Youth of the African Democratic Rally of Ivory Coast (French: Jeunesse du Rasseblement Démocratique Africain de Côte d'Ivoire, JRDACI) is a political youth movement in Ivory Coast. JRDACI was the youth wing of the African Democratic Rally (R.D.A.) in that country.

JRDACI was founded in Treichville on March 14, 1959. It was fiercely anti-colonial. Félix Houphouët-Boigny rapidly saw JRDACI as a nest of opposition, and ordered it to dissolve.

The general secretary of JRDACI was Amadou Koné, later Minister of Health.
