= 1965 Ivorian general election =

- 7 November 1965
- Presidential election
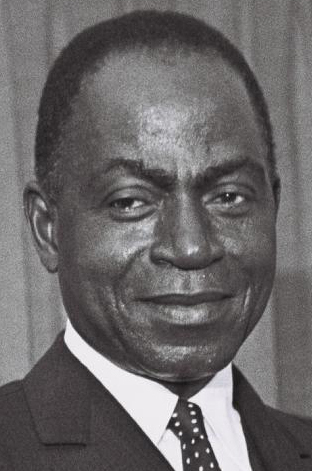
Candidate	Félix Houphouët-Boigny
Party	PDCI–RDA
Popular vote	1,867,605
Percentage	100%
- Parliamentary election
- All 85 seats in the National Assembly; 43 seats needed for a majority
- Turnout: 99.59%
Party	Vote %	Seats	+/–
PDCI–RDA	100	85	+15
This lists parties that won seats. See the complete results below.

General elections were held in Ivory Coast on 7 November 1965 to elect a president and National Assembly. At the time the country was a one-party state with the Democratic Party of Ivory Coast – African Democratic Rally (PDCI–RDA) as the sole legal party. Its leader Félix Houphouët-Boigny was elected president unopposed, whilst the PDCI–RDA won all 85 seats in the National Assembly. Voter turnout was 99.6%.

== Results ==
=== President ===
Candidate	Party	Votes	%
Félix Houphouët-Boigny	Democratic Party of Ivory Coast	1,867,605	100.00
Total		1,867,605	100.00
Valid votes		1,867,605	99.98
Invalid/blank votes		332	0.02
Total votes		1,867,937	100.00
Registered voters/turnout		1,875,547	99.59
Source: Nohlen et al.

=== National Assembly ===
Party	Votes	%	Seats	+/–
Democratic Party of Ivory Coast	1,863,005	100.00	85	+15
Total	1,863,005	100.00	85	+15
Valid votes	1,863,005	99.74		
Invalid/blank votes	4,932	0.26		
Total votes	1,867,937	100.00		
Registered voters/turnout	1,875,547	99.59		
Source: Nohlen et al.
