= 1985 Ivorian presidential election =

- 27 October 1985
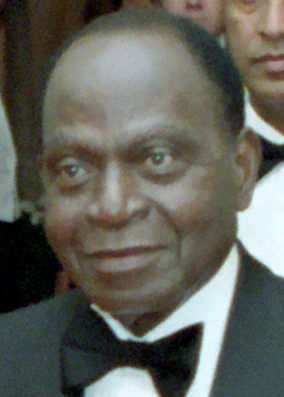
Candidate	Félix Houphouët-Boigny
Party	PDCI–RDA
Popular vote	3,516,524
Percentage	100%
President before election
Félix Houphouët-Boigny
PDCI–RDA
Elected President
Félix Houphouët-Boigny
PDCI–RDA

Presidential elections were held in Ivory Coast on 27 October 1985. At the time the country was a one-party state with the Democratic Party of Ivory Coast – African Democratic Rally as the sole legal party. Its leader, long-term President Félix Houphouët-Boigny was the only candidate, and was re-elected unopposed.

== Results ==
Candidate	Party	Votes	%
Félix Houphouët-Boigny	Democratic Party of Ivory Coast – African Democratic Rally	3,516,524	100.00
Total		3,516,524	100.00
Registered voters/turnout		3,517,259	–
Source: Nohlen et al.
