= Alain Jaspard =

French film producer

Alain Jaspard is a French director and author. He was born in 1940. He has adapted several children's books into animated series, notably Tom-Tom and Nana by Jacqueline Cohen and Bernadette Després, Le Proverbe by Marcel Aymé, as well as Les Contes de la rue Broca by Pierre Gripari. His books include Les Bleus étaient verts and Pleurer des rivieres. In 2022, the film The Sixth Child, a loose adaptation of Pleurer des rivieres, was released.
