= Eburnean Democratic Bloc =

Eburnean Democratic Bloc (in French: Bloc Démocratique Eburnéen), was a splinter group of the Democratic Party of Côte d'Ivoire (PDCI) formed in 1949. BDE opposed what they saw as the 'submission' of PDCI under the French Communist Party (PCF).

The president of BDE was Etienne Djaument.
