= Rose Doudou Guéï =

First Lady of Côte d'Ivoire

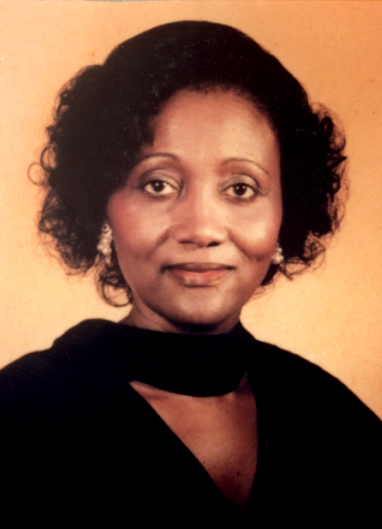

First Lady of Ivory Coast
- In office December 24, 1999 – October 26, 2000
- President: Robert Guéï
- Preceded by: Henriette Konan Bédié
- Succeeded by: Simone Gbagbo

Personal details
- Died: September 19, 2002 Cocody, Abidjan, Ivory Coast
- Spouse: Robert Guéï (?–2002; their deaths)
- Children: 2

Rose Doudou Guéï (died September 19, 2002) was wife of the Head of State of Côte d'Ivoire, Robert Guéï, and consequently First Lady of Ivory Coast from 1999 to 2000.

== Coup in 2000 ==
A mutiny within Côte d'Ivoire's military evolved into a coup d'état in 2000, and General Robert Guéï was installed as the first military ruler of Côte d'Ivoire.

== Death ==
A group opposed to the military regime staged a new coup d'état in 2002, marking the First Ivorian Civil War and political crisis. Robert Guéï and Rose Doudou Guéï were killed in September 2002. Associates of Robert Guéï claimed that he and Rose Doudou Guéï were executed, along with several other people, as they sat down for a meal at their home in Abidjan. The forces of the new President, Laurent Gbagbo, were accused of being behind the killings. In 2016, Captain Anselme Séka Yapo and General Dogbo Blé were sentenced to life imprisonment for their involvement in the murder of Robert Guéï and Rose Doudou Guéï.

She was buried, reportedly to public indifference, on May 5, 2006, in front of Saint-Paul Cathedral in the Plateau area of Abidjan north, but her remains are now located at the municipal cemetery of Port-Bouët in Abidjan south.

=== Aftermath ===
Following the assassinations, Laurent Gbagbo became Côte d'Ivoire's President, having emerged victorious from the First Ivorian Civil War, during which many thousands were killed.

Franck Guéï, the eldest son of Robert and Rose Doudou Guéï, allied himself with Gbagbo, and was Côte d'Ivoire's Minister of Sports, Youth and Leisure until Gbagbo was overthrown during the Second Ivorian Civil War in 2011. Gbagbo was replaced by Alassane Ouattara. Robert Guéï's reputation has been rehabilitated under Ouattara. Francis Pédou Guéi, younger brother of Franck Guéi, has allied himself with Ouattara, and is active in the party of his father, the UDPCI.

== See also ==
- Robert Guéï
- Laurent Gbagbo
- Alassane Ouattara
- List of people assassinated in Africa
