= 1985 Stockholm municipal election =

Swedish local election

The Stockholm municipal election of 1985 was held on 15 September 1985 concurrently with the 1985 Swedish parliamentary election. This election used a party-list proportional representation system to allocate the 101 seats of the Stockholm City Council (Stockholms stadsfullmäktige) amongst the various Swedish political parties. Voter turnout was 85.2%.

The Swedish Centre Party received only 2.9% of the votes in this election, less than half of the 6.3% they received in 1982, and thus the Centre Party was not allocated any seats as a result of this election. This marks their first failure to achieve a mandate since they first entered the Stockholm City Council in 1966.

== Results ==
Party	Votes			Seats	
Party	#	%	+ –	#	+ –
Social Democrats; Socialdemokraterna (s)	164,770	35.6%	–3.6%	40	–1
Moderate Party; Moderata samlingspartiet (m)	135,821	29.4%	–2.8%	33	–1
People's Party; Folkpartiet (fp)	62,412	13.5%	+8.4%	14	+8
Left Party Communists; Vänsterpartiet kommunisterna (v)	40,877	8.8%	–0.5%	10	–1
Centre Party; Centerpartiet (c)	13,346	2.9%	–3.4%	0	–6
Green Party; Miljöpartiet (mp)	8,696	1.9%	+1.2%	0	±0
Christian Democratic; Kristdemokratiska samhällspartiet (kd)	3,988	0.9%	–0.3%	0	±0
Other parties	32,514	7.0%	+1.0%	4	+1
Total	462,424	100%	—	101	±0
Invalid ballots	4,017				

== See also ==
- Elections in Sweden
- List of political parties in Sweden
- City of Stockholm
