= 1985 Micronesian general election =

1985 Micronesian parliamentary election
← 1983	5 March 1985	1987 →

10 out of 14 seats in Congress

Parliamentary elections were held in the Federated States of Micronesia on 5 March 1985. All candidates for seats in Congress ran as independents.
