= 1975 Ivorian general election =

- 16 November 1975
- Presidential election
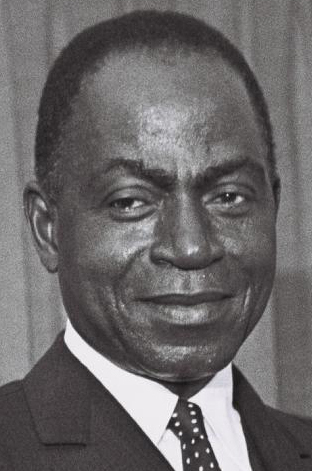
Candidate	Félix Houphouët-Boigny
Party	PDCI–RDA
Popular vote	2,404,905
Percentage	100%
- Parliamentary election
- All 120 seats in the National Assembly; 61 seats needed for a majority
- Turnout: 99.29%
Party	Vote %	Seats	+/–
PDCI–RDA	100	120	+20
This lists parties that won seats. See the complete results below.

General elections were held in Ivory Coast on 16 November 1975 to elect a President and National Assembly. At the time the country was a one-party state with the Democratic Party of Ivory Coast – African Democratic Rally (PDCI-RDA) as the sole legal party. Its leader Félix Houphouët-Boigny was elected President unopposed, whilst in the National Assembly election the PDCI-RDA won all 120 seats (increased from 100 at the previous elections). Voter turnout was reported to be 99.3% in the parliamentary election and 99.8% in the presidential election.

== Results ==
=== President ===
Candidate	Party	Votes	%
Félix Houphouët-Boigny	Democratic Party ofIvory Coast	2,404,905	100.00
Total		2,404,905	100.00
Valid votes		2,404,905	99.98
Invalid/blank votes		502	0.02
Total votes		2,405,407	100.00
Registered voters/turnout		2,410,042	99.81
Source: Nohlen et al.

=== National Assembly ===
Party	Votes	%	Seats	+/–
Democratic Party of Ivory Coast	2,390,566	100.00	120	+20
Total	2,390,566	100.00	120	+20
Valid votes	2,390,566	99.90		
Invalid/blank votes	2,453	0.10		
Total votes	2,393,019	100.00		
Registered voters/turnout	2,410,042	99.29		
Source: Nohlen et al.
