= Democratic Party of Ivory Coast – African Democratic Rally =

Political party in Ivory Coast

Democratic Party of Ivory Coast – African Democratic Rally Parti Démocratique de Côte d'Ivoire — Rassemblement Démocratique Africain
- Abbreviation: PDCI-RDA
- Leader: Tidjane Thiam
- Founder: Félix Houphouët-Boigny
- Founded: 9 April 1946 (80 years, 198 days)
- Preceded by: African Agricultural Union
- Headquarters: Abidjan, Ivory Coast
- Ideology: Conservatism; Economic liberalism Houphouëtism; Historical: Planned liberalism (1960–1978); State capitalism (1960–1970s); Pan-Africanism
- Political position: Centre-right
- Regional affiliation: Democrat Union of Africa; African Democratic Rally
- International affiliation: International Democracy Union
- Seats in the National Assembly: 32 / 255
- Seats in the Senate: 6 / 99

Website
- pdcirda.ci

The Democratic Party of Ivory Coast – African Democratic Rally (French: Parti Démocratique de Côte d'Ivoire — Rassemblement Démocratique Africain; abbreviated PDCI-RDA) is a centre-right political party in Ivory Coast.

== History ==
Founded during the colonial era in 1946, as an outgrowth of the African Agricultural Union, and initially affiliated with the French Communist Party, it became the only legal party in the country upon independence in 1960. For the next 30 years, the PDCI and the government were effectively one. Every five years, its founder and leader, Félix Houphouët-Boigny, was automatically elected to a five-year term as president of the republic and confirmed in office via a referendum. At the same time, a single list of PDCI candidates was returned to the National Assembly.

All adult Ivorians were required to be members of the party, which was considered the primary intermediary between the government and the people. Even after opposition parties were legalised in 1990, the PDCI continued to dominate Ivorian politics. At the 1990 elections, Houphouët-Boigny was reelected with an implausible 81 percent of the vote, and the party won all but 12 seats in the legislature.

Houphouët-Boigny led the party from its formation until his death in 1993. A year later, acting president of the republic Henri Konan Bédié became the party's second leader. He served out Houphouët-Boigny's seventh term, and was elected in his own right in 1995 with over 96 percent of the vote; the opposition parties had boycotted the election in protest of new eligibility requirements that they deemed unfair. The party lost power when Bédié was ousted in a December 1999 coup.

The PDCI announced in early 2000 that it would hold a congress to choose new leadership, and Bédié denounced this as a "putsch"; the party decided to retain Bédié in the leadership, however. In August, Bédié and four other PDCI members registered as candidates in the October 2000 presidential election; shortly afterward, Emile Constant Bombet, who had served as Interior Minister under Bédié, defeated Bédié for the PDCI presidential nomination. Bombet and Bédié were both barred from running by the Constitutional Court in early October, and on October 10 Bédié called for a boycott of the election.

Unlike many former single parties in Africa, the PDCI has made a good account of itself since losing power. In the parliamentary election held on 10 December 2000 and 14 January 2001, the party won 94 out of 225 seats.

On 18 May 2005, the PDCI and the Rally of the Republicans (RDR), despite a history of hostility towards one another (the RDR had been formed as a liberal splinter from the PDCI in 1994), signed an agreement to form a coalition, the Rally of Houphouëtists for Democracy and Peace, along with two smaller parties, the Union for Democracy and Peace in Ivory Coast (UDPCI) and the Movement of the Forces of the Future (MFA), ahead of the presidential election then planned for October 2005. This election was delayed several times, finally held in 2010. By that time, the two parties had resumed competing against each other.

At the 11 December 2011 parliamentary election, the PDCI remained the principal opposition party, with 76 seats.

At the 2016 parliamentary election, the Rally of Houphouëtists for Democracy and Peace (composed of the RDR, the PDCI and some minor parties) won a strong majority at the National Assembly.

At the 2021 Ivorian parliamentary election, the PDCI only gained around 6% of the vote and 23 seats. The Rally of Houphouëtists for Democracy and Peace won, in contrast, 49% of the vote and now have 137 seats in the parliament.

The PDCI Primary will take place on April 16, 2025, to designate the candidate for the presidential elections of October 2025.

Thiam resigned as party president on May 12, 2025, considering himself the victim of "judicial harassment".

== Electoral history ==
=== Presidential elections ===
Election	Party candidate	Votes	%	Votes	%	Results
Election	Party candidate	First Round		Second Round		Results
1960	Félix Houphouët-Boigny	1,641,352	100%	-	-	Elected ✓
1965	Félix Houphouët-Boigny	1,867,605	100%	-	-	Elected ✓
1970	Félix Houphouët-Boigny	2,003,046	100%	-	-	Elected ✓
1975	Félix Houphouët-Boigny	2,404,905	100%	-	-	Elected ✓
1980	Félix Houphouët-Boigny	2,795,150	100%	-	-	Elected ✓
1985	Félix Houphouët-Boigny	3,516,524	100%	-	-	Elected ✓
1990	Félix Houphouët-Boigny	2,445,365	81.68%	-	-	Elected ✓
1995	Henri Konan Bédié	1,837,154	96.0%	-	-	Elected ✓
2000	Henri Konan Bédié	Boycotted				
2010	Henri Konan Bédié	1,165,532	25.24%	-	-	Lost ✗
2015	Supported Alassane Ouattara	2,618,229	83.66%	-	-	Elected ✓
2020	Henri Konan Bédié	53,330	1.68%	-	-	Lost ✗

=== National Assembly elections ===
Election	Party leader	Votes	%	Seats	+/–	Position
1946–47	Félix Houphouët-Boigny			24 / 30	▲24	▲1st
1952	Félix Houphouët-Boigny	66,838	71.9%	28 / 32	▲4	1st
1957	Félix Houphouët-Boigny	720,828	89.3%	58 / 60	▲30	1st
1959	Félix Houphouët-Boigny	1,522,324	100%	100 / 100	▲40	1st
1960	Félix Houphouët-Boigny	1,586,518	100%	70 / 70	▼30	1st
1965	Félix Houphouët-Boigny	1,863,005	100%	85 / 85	▲15	1st
1970	Félix Houphouët-Boigny	1,997,560	100%	100 / 100	▲15	1st
1975	Félix Houphouët-Boigny	2,390,566	100%	120 / 120	▲20	1st
1980	Félix Houphouët-Boigny		100%	147 / 147	▲27	1st
1985	Félix Houphouët-Boigny		100%	175 / 175	▲30	1st
1990	Félix Houphouët-Boigny	1,324,549	71.7%	163 / 175	▼12	1st
1995	Henri Konan Bédié			148 / 175	▼15	1st
2000–01	Henri Konan Bédié			94 / 225	▼54	▼2nd
2011	Henri Konan Bédié	564,958	28.85%	77 / 255	▼17	2nd
2016	Henri Konan Bédié	1,019,057	50.26% as part of RHDP	77 / 255	Steady	2nd
2021	Henri Konan Bédié	602,201	22.54% with EDC	73 / 255	▼4	2nd
2025	Tidjane Thiam	354,618	12.04	32 / 255	▼41	2nd

== See also ==
- Eburnean Democratic Bloc, splinter group formed in 1949
- Youth of the African Democratic Rally of Ivory Coast
- Patrick Achi
