= Party of the French Union of Ivory Coast =

Party of the French Union of Ivory Coast (French: Parti de l'Union française de Côte d'Ivoire, PUFCI) was a political party in colonial Ivory Coast. PUFCI was formed in 1951 through the merger of the Progressive Party of Ivory Coast (PPCI) and Entente of Independents of Ivory Coast (EDICI). The administrative secretary of PUFCI was Vamé Doumouya.

== Sources ==
- Gbagbo, Laurent: Côte d'Ivoire, Pour une alternative démocratique. Paris: L'Harmattan, 1983.
