= First Lady of Ivory Coast =

Wife of the president of the Ivory Coast

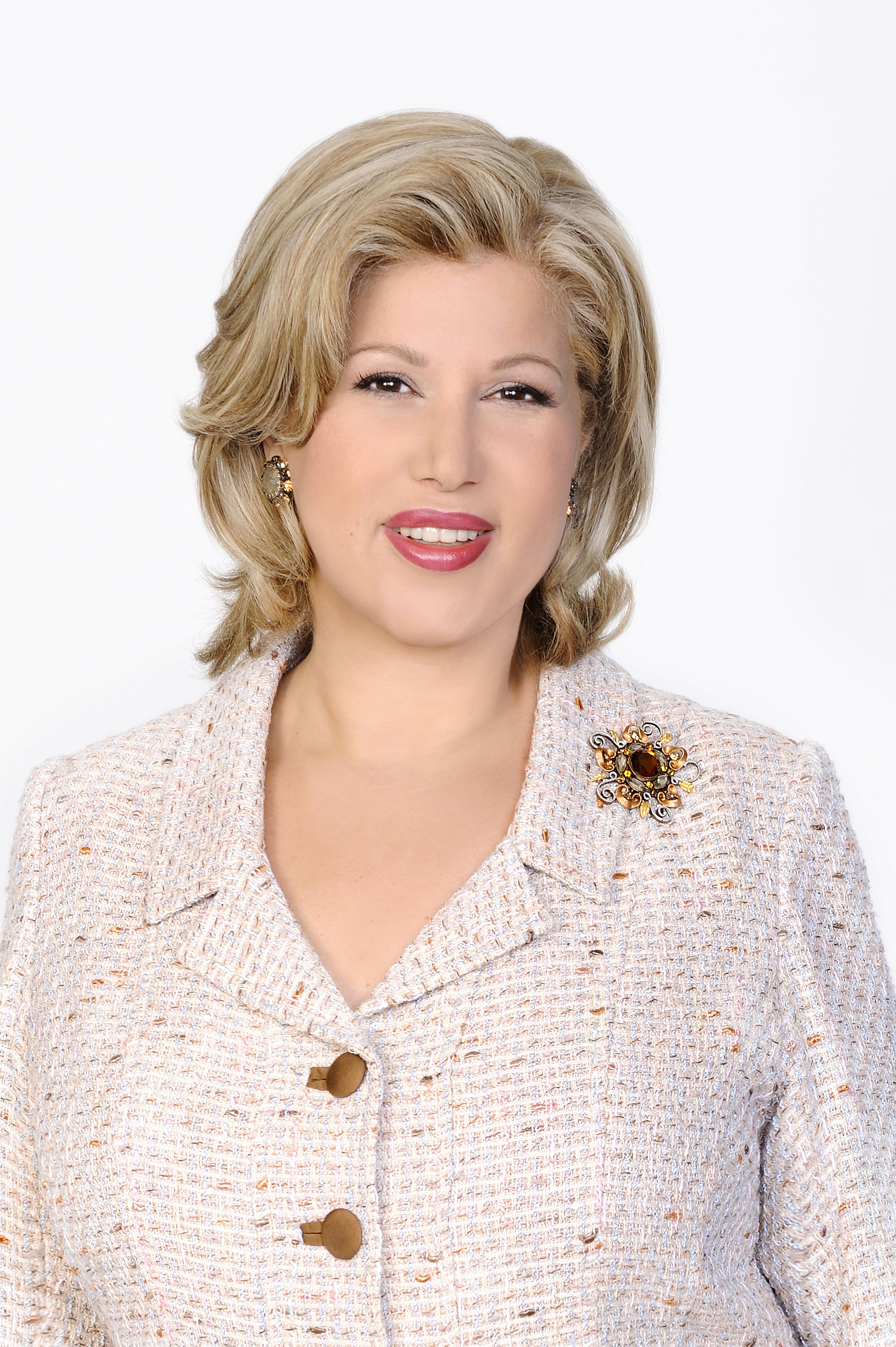
- Incumbent; Dominique Ouattara since 11 April 2011
- Inaugural holder: Marie-Thérèse Houphouët-Boigny
- Formation: 3 November 1960

The first lady of Ivory Coast (French: Première dame de Côte d'Ivoire) is the title attributed to the wife of the president of Ivory Coast. The current first lady is Dominique Ouattara, who has held the office since 11 April 2011. (Dominique Ouattara and her predecessor, Simone Gbagbo, were the co-claimants of the office from 4 December 2010 to 11 April 2011.)

== First ladies of Ivory Coast ==
Name	Term begins	Term ends	President or Head of State	Notes
Marie-Thérèse Houphouët-Boigny	3 November 1960	7 December 1993	Félix Houphouët-Boigny	
Henriette Konan Bédié	7 December 1993	24 December 1999	Henri Konan Bédié	Born Henriette Koizan Bomo, she married Bédié in 1957.
Rose Doudou Guéï	24 December 1999	26 October 2000	Robert Guéï	
Simone Gbagbo*	26 October 2000	11 April 2011*	Laurent Gbagbo*	
Dominique Ouattara*	11 April 2011*	Present	Alassane Ouattara*	Born Dominique Claudine Nouvian, of French origin

- Co-claimants from 4 December 2010 to 11 April 2011

== See also ==
- List of heads of state of Ivory Coast
