= List of heads of state of Ivory Coast =

President of the Republic of Côte d'Ivoire
- Président de la République de Côte d'Ivoire (French)
- Coat of arms of Ivory Coast

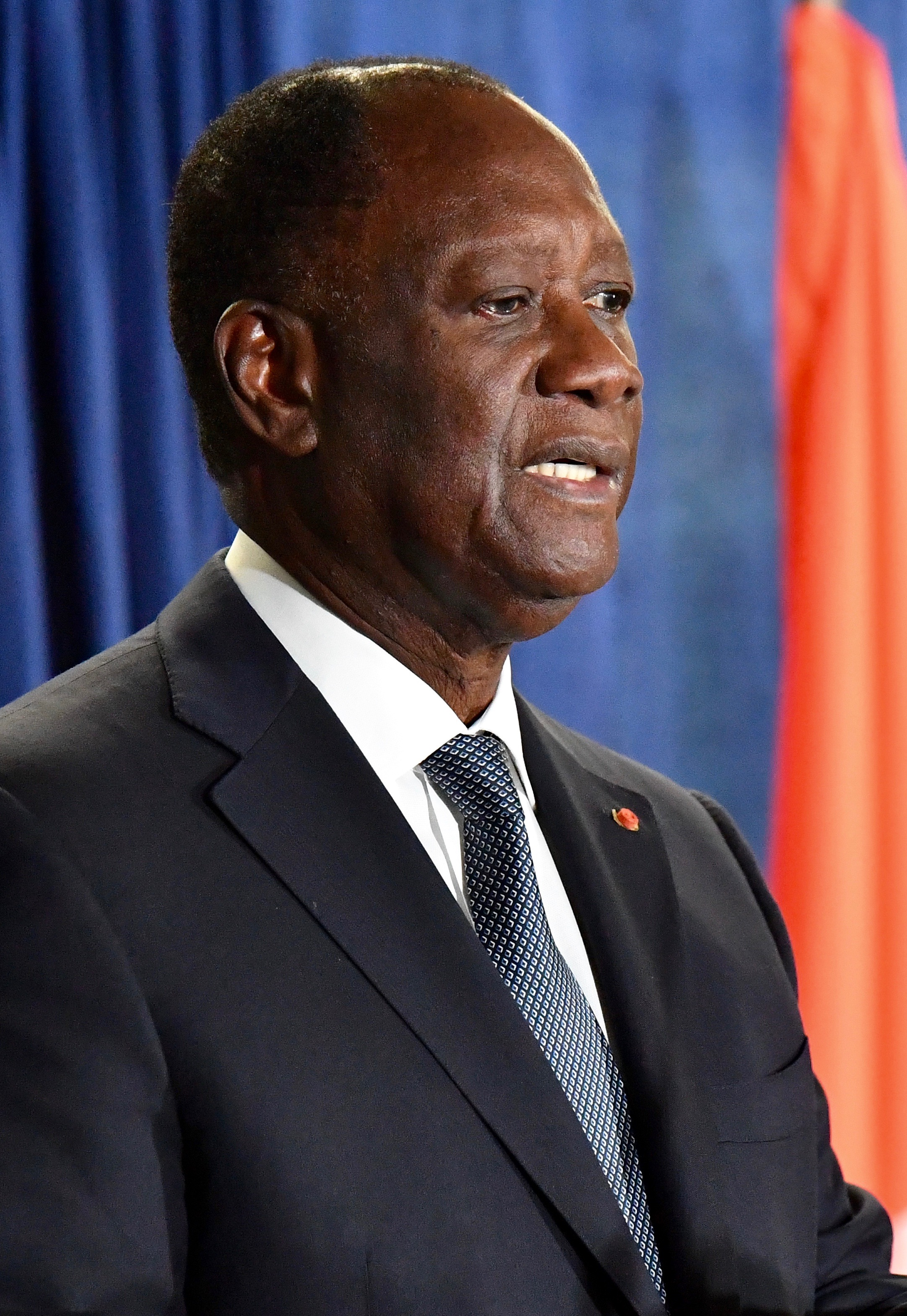
- Incumbent; Alassane Ouattara since 4 December 2010
- Residence: Presidential Palace, Abidjan
- Term length: Five years, renewable
- Constituting instrument: Constitution of Ivory Coast (2016)
- Inaugural holder: Félix Houphouët-Boigny
- Formation: 3 November 1960; 65 years ago
- Deputy: Vice President of Ivory Coast
- Salary: US$100,000 annually

This article lists the heads of state of Ivory Coast, officially the Republic of Côte d'Ivoire, since the country gained independence from France in 1960. Alassane Ouattara has been serving as President of Ivory Coast since 4 December 2010.

== Term limits ==
There is a two-term limit for the president in the new 2016 Constitution of Ivory Coast. This limit has been lifted for Alassane Ouattara, allowing him to run for third and fourth terms.

== List of officeholders ==
Political parties

Democratic Party of Ivory Coast – African Democratic Rally (PDCI–RDA)
Ivorian Popular Front (FPI)
Rally of the Republicans (RDR)

Coalition

Rally of Houphouëtists for Democracy and Peace (RHDP)

Other factions

Military

Symbols

^{§} Elected unopposed

^{†} Died in office

No.	Portrait	Name (Birth–Death)	Elected	Term of office			Political party (Coalition)	Vice-president	Ref.
No.	Portrait	Name (Birth–Death)	Elected	Took office	Left office	Time in office	Political party (Coalition)	Vice-president	Ref.
1		Félix Houphouët-Boigny (1905–1993)	1960^{[§]} 1965^{[§]} 1970^{[§]} 1975^{[§]} 1980^{[§]} 1985^{[§]} 1990	3 November 1960	7 December 1993^{[†]}	33 years, 34 days	PDCI–RDA	Position not established	
2		Henri Konan Bédié (1934–2023) (Note: Acting President until 22 October 1995.)	1995	7 December 1993	24 December 1999 (Deposed in a coup)	6 years, 17 days	PDCI–RDA	Position not established	
3		Robert Guéï (1941–2002) (Note: Styled as President of the National Public Salvation Committee until 4 January 2000.)	—	24 December 1999	26 October 2000	307 days	Military	Position not established	
4		Laurent Gbagbo (born 1945) (Note: Co-claimant from 4 December 2010 to 11 April 2011.)	2000	26 October 2000	11 April 2011 (Deposed in a civil war)	10 years, 167 days	FPI	Position not established	
5		Alassane Ouattara (born 1942)	2010; 2015; 2020; 2025	4 December 2010	Incumbent	15 years, 277 days	RDR (RHDP)	Position not established	
5		Alassane Ouattara (born 1942)	2010; 2015; 2020; 2025	4 December 2010	Incumbent	15 years, 277 days	RDR (RHDP)	Daniel Kablan Duncan	
5		Alassane Ouattara (born 1942)	2010; 2015; 2020; 2025	4 December 2010	Incumbent	15 years, 277 days	RDR (RHDP)	Tiémoko Meyliet Koné	

== Latest election ==
Candidate	Party	Votes	%
Alassane Ouattara	Rally of Houphouëtists for Democracy and Peace	3,759,030	91.23
Jean-Louis Billon	Democratic Congress	129,493	3.14
Simone Gbagbo	Movement of Capable Generations	101,238	2.46
Ahoua Don Mello	Independent	82,508	2.00
Henriette Lagou Adjoua	Independent	48,261	1.17
Total		4,120,530	100.00
Valid votes		4,120,530	95.99
Invalid votes		105,156	2.45
Blank votes		66,788	1.56
Total votes		4,292,474	100.00
Registered voters/turnout		8,568,456	50.10
Source: CEI

== See also ==
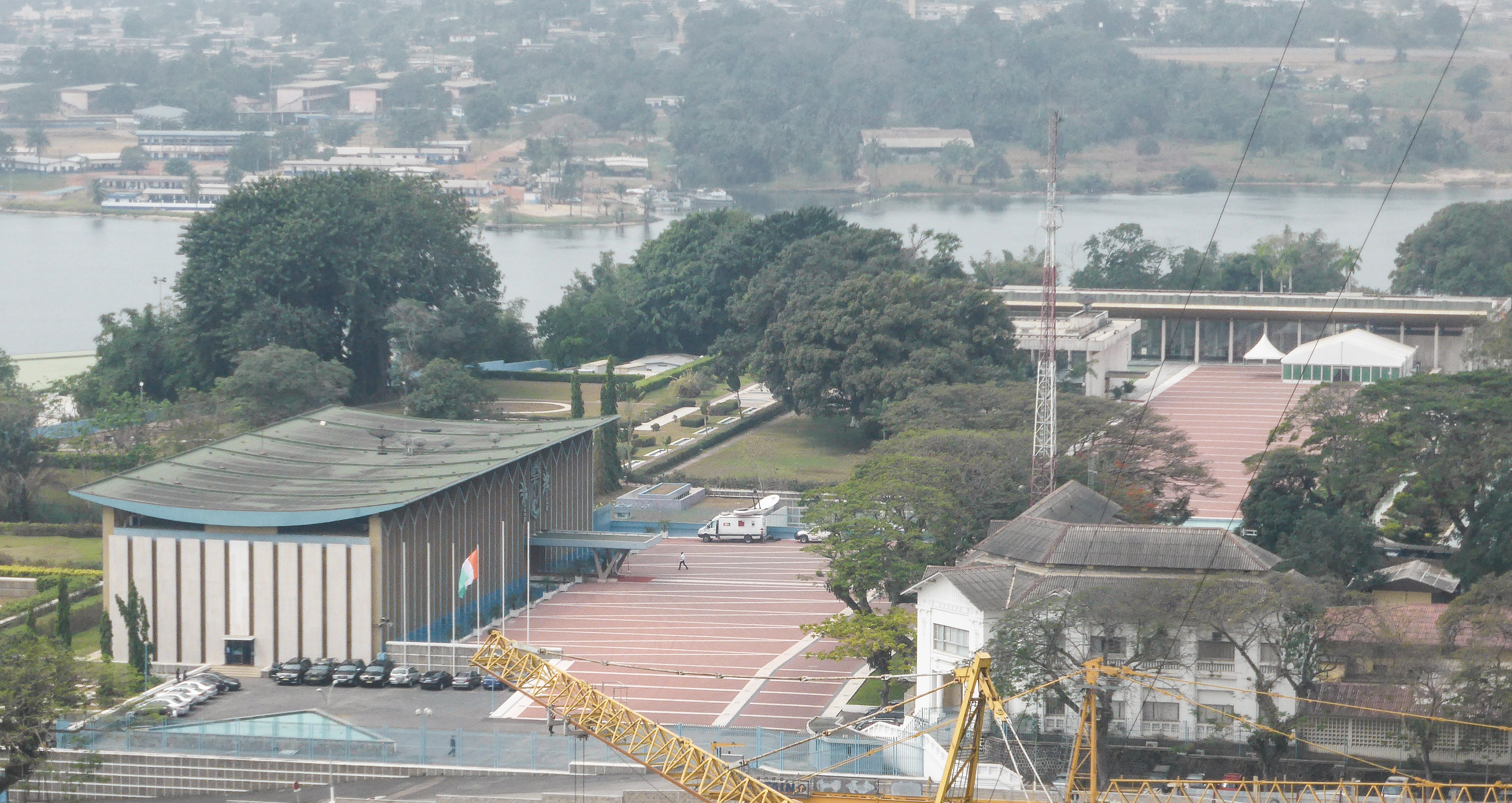
Presidential Palace in Abidjan

- Politics of Ivory Coast
- Vice President of Ivory Coast
- List of heads of government of Ivory Coast
- List of colonial governors of Ivory Coast
- First Lady of Ivory Coast

== Sources ==
- "Rulers". www.rulers.org.
- Guinness Book of Kings Rulers & Statesmen, Clive Carpenter, Guinness Superlatives Ltd
