= Foreign relations of Ivory Coast =

Throughout the Cold War, Ivory Coast's foreign policy was generally favorable toward the West. In particular, Félix Houphouët-Boigny kept relations with France that was among the closest between any African country and a former colonial power. The country became a member of the United Nations at independence in 1960 and participates in most of its specialized agencies. It is also an associate member of the European Union.

== Other important relations ==
In the past decade, Indo-Ivorian relations have considerably expanded as India seeks to develop an extensive commercial and strategic partnership in the West African region. Ivory Coast opened its resident mission in New Delhi in September 2004. Both nations are currently fostering efforts to increase trade, investments and economic cooperation.

== Diplomatic relations ==
List of countries which the Ivory Coast maintains diplomatic relations with:

#	Country	Date
1	Germany	7 August 1960
2	United States	7 August 1960
3	France	8 August 1960
4	United Kingdom	12 October 1960
5	Belgium	15 March 1961
6	Ghana	15 March 1961
7	Guinea	21 March 1961
8	Tunisia	22 March 1961
9	Japan	15 April 1961
10	Israel	24 May 1961
11	Switzerland	1 June 1961
12	Italy	18 June 1961
13	South Korea	23 July 1961
14	Nigeria	26 July 1961
15	Liberia	31 July 1961
16	Lebanon	4 October 1961
17	India	5 November 1961
18	Sierra Leone	1961
19	Netherlands	9 January 1962
20	Mali	16 April 1962
21	Canada	27 April 1962
22	Mauritania	15 August 1962
23	Morocco	16 August 1962
24	Cameroon	3 September 1962
25	Norway	27 September 1962
26	Haiti	1962
27	Luxembourg	29 January 1963
28	Sweden	5 June 1963
29	Cyprus	25 January 1964
30	Algeria	May 1964
31	Spain	12 June 1964
32	Finland	18 June 1964
33	Tanzania	3 July 1964
34	Turkey	14 July 1964
35	Peru	18 August 1964
36	Kenya	10 September 1964
37	Denmark	28 November 1964
38	Egypt	15 December 1964
39	Colombia	22 February 1965
40	Ethiopia	4 March 1966
41	Thailand	30 June 1966
42	Uganda	21 July 1966
43	Democratic Republic of the Congo	25 October 1966
44	Burkina Faso	30 December 1966
45	Gabon	30 December 1966
46	Russia	23 January 1967
47	Romania	18 May 1967
48	Bulgaria	15 December 1967
49	Hungary	21 February 1968
50	Zambia	11 April 1968
51	Argentina	15 May 1968
52	Serbia	15 June 1968
53	Lesotho	28 October 1968
54	Brazil	31 October 1968
55	Pakistan	20 December 1968
56	Austria	14 January 1969
57	Venezuela	15 July 1970
—	Holy See	26 October 1970
58	Greece	17 December 1970
59	Central African Republic	10 March 1971
60	Trinidad and Tobago	15 January 1973
61	Costa Rica	15 February 1973
62	Niger	30 October 1973
63	Rwanda	15 March 1974
64	Poland	9 June 1974
65	Portugal	28 January 1975
66	Bangladesh	10 February 1975
67	Sudan	13 April 1975
68	Australia	3 July 1975
69	Gambia	8 August 1975
70	Iran	2 October 1975
71	Vietnam	6 October 1975
72	Mexico	13 November 1975
73	Chad	15 November 1977
74	Senegal	18 March 1978
75	Chile	8 March 1979
76	Guinea-Bissau	9 October 1979
77	Cape Verde	3 December 1979
78	Indonesia	4 June 1982
79	China	2 March 1983
80	Angola	3 June 1983
81	Benin	28 October 1983
82	Czech Republic	1 September 1984
83	Uruguay	1 September 1984
84	Albania	9 January 1985
85	North Korea	9 January 1985
86	Saudi Arabia	9 January 1985
87	Cuba	11 February 1986
88	Mongolia	6 July 1986
89	Vanuatu	11 July 1986
90	Nicaragua	3 April 1987
91	Bahamas	27 June 1988
92	Seychelles	19 April 1989
93	Libya	6 October 1989
94	Oman	28 January 1991
95	Malaysia	7 May 1991
96	South Africa	21 May 1992
97	Kuwait	23 July 1992
98	Paraguay	28 July 1992
99	Ukraine	20 October 1992
100	Namibia	3 December 1992
101	Eritrea	4 August 1993
102	Slovenia	12 May 1994
103	United Arab Emirates	30 May 1994
104	Brunei	3 June 1994
105	Qatar	29 July 1994
106	Philippines	22 March 1995
107	Bahrain	17 June 1995
108	Croatia	17 October 1995
109	Bosnia and Herzegovina	18 October 1995
110	Georgia	21 December 1995
111	Latvia	4 June 1996
112	Zimbabwe	16 September 1996
113	Singapore	2 October 1996
114	Azerbaijan	19 November 1996
115	Lithuania	21 October 1997
116	El Salvador	19 December 1997
117	Armenia	13 May 1998
118	Belarus	30 September 1998
119	Ireland	3 May 2000
120	North Macedonia	14 September 2000
121	Slovakia	28 October 2002
122	Iceland	14 October 2005
123	Botswana	6 June 2007
124	Dominican Republic	26 September 2007
125	Cambodia	9 April 2008
126	Madagascar	29 May 2008
127	Laos	22 July 2008
128	Kazakhstan	23 May 2009
129	Burundi	8 April 2010
130	Equatorial Guinea	12 August 2010
—	State of Palestine	24 January 2012
131	Estonia	8 June 2012
132	Sri Lanka	5 March 2014
133	Guatemala	13 March 2014
134	Liechtenstein	14 March 2014
135	Fiji	4 April 2014
136	Montenegro	29 October 2014
137	Jordan	15 April 2015
138	Ecuador	3 June 2015
139	Kyrgyzstan	25 September 2015
140	Malta	6 November 2015
141	Suriname	18 November 2015
142	Monaco	11 February 2016
143	Comoros	16 February 2016
144	Tajikistan	2 March 2016
145	Mauritius	4 March 2016
146	Djibouti	28 April 2016
147	Panama	29 April 2016
—	Kosovo	24 August 2016
148	Nepal	16 June 2017
149	San Marino	9 November 2017
150	Mozambique	11 December 2017
151	Maldives	13 April 2018
152	Saint Vincent and the Grenadines	28 January 2022
153	São Tomé and Príncipe	2 March 2022
154	Saint Lucia	22 September 2022
155	Eswatini	8 August 2024
156	Bolivia	19 November 2024
157	South Sudan	21 November 2024
158	Andorra	16 December 2024
159	Jamaica	16 December 2024
160	Dominica	5 February 2025
161	Uzbekistan	29 April 2025
162	Somalia	5 August 2025
163	Moldova	16 December 2025
164	Guyana	23 April 2026
165	Belize	14 May 2026
166	Marshall Islands	23 September 2026
167	Republic of the Congo	Unknown
168	Iraq	Unknown
169	New Zealand	Unknown
170	Togo	Unknown

== Bilateral relations ==
=== Africa ===
Country	Formal Relations Began	Notes
Angola	3 June 1983	Both countries established diplomatic relations on 3 June 1983 when Ambassador of Ivory Coast to Angola, M. Jean-Marie Kacou Gervais presented his letters of credentials to President Jose Eduardo Dos Santos.: Ivory Coast has an embassy in Luanda.; Angola has an embassy in Abidjan, which also functions as the non-resident embassy to Mali.
Benin	28 October 1983	Both countries established diplomatic relations on 28 October 1983 when Ambassador of Benin to Cote d'Ivoire Mr. Benon Nicolas presented his credentials to President Houphouët - Boigny.
Burkina Faso		Burkina Faso has an embassy in Abidjan and a consulate in Bouake.; Ivory Coast has an embassy in Ouagadougou.; There are 3 million Burkinabes reside in Ivory Coast in 2019.
Cameroon	3 September 1962	Both countries established diplomatic relations on 3 September 1962: Cameroon has an embassy in Abidjan.; Ivory Coast has an embassy in Yaounde, which also functions as the non-resident embassy to Central African Republic.
Cape Verde	3 December 1979	Both countries established diplomatic relations on 3 December 1979: Cape Verde and Ivory Coast are all represented through their respective embassy in Dakar, Senegal.
Central African Republic	10 March 1971	Both countries established diplomatic relations on 10 March 1971: Central African Republic has an embassy in Abidjan.; Ivory Coast has an embassy in Yaounde, Cameroon, functions as the non-resident embassy to Central African Republic.
Chad	15 November 1977	Both countries established diplomatic relations on 15 November 1977: Chad has an embassy in Abidjan.; Ivory Coast has an embassy in N'Djamena.; Both countries are full members of the African Union and Organisation internationale de la Francophonie.
Comoros	16 February 2016	Both countries established diplomatic relations on 16 February 2016 when first Ambassador of Cote d'Ivoire Mr. Amos Koffi Djadan presented his credentials to President of Comoros Dr. Ikililou Dhoinine.
Egypt	15 December 1964	Both countries established diplomatic relations on 15 December 1964 when the UAR (Egypt) has decided to open an embassy in Ivory Coast.
Ethiopia	4 March 1966	Both countries established diplomatic relations on 4 March 1966 when first Ambassador of Ethiopia in Cote d'Ivoire presented his credentials
Gabon	30 December 1966	Both countries established diplomatic relations on 30 December 1966 when Ambassador of Gabon to Ivory Coast Mr. Simon Edan, has presented his credentials.: Ivory Coast has an embassy in Libreville.; Gabon has an embassy in Abidjan.
Gambia	8 August 1975	Both countries established diuplomatic relations on 8 August 1975 when first Ambassador of the Gambia to Ivory Coast Mr. Salieu Cham, presented his credentials to President Houphouet-Boigny.
Ghana	15 March 1961	See Ghana–Ivory Coast relations Both countries established diplomatic relations on 15 March 1961. In 1989, after fifteen years of no progress, the Ghana-Ivory Coast border redemarcation commission finally agreed on the definition of the 640-kilometer border between the two countries. The PNDC thereafter worked to improve the transportation and communication links with both Ivory Coast and Togo, despite problems with both countries. By 1992 Ghana's relations with Ivory Coast were relatively good. Hopes for lasting improvement in Ghana's relations with its western neighbor, however, were quickly dashed following some ugly incidents in late 1993 and early 1994. They began on November 1, 1993, with the return of sports fans to Ivory Coast following a championship soccer match in Kumasi, Ghana, that had resulted in the elimination of Ivory Coast from competition. Ghanaian immigrants in Ivory Coast were violently attacked, and as many as forty or more Ghanaians were killed.: Ghana has an embassy in Abidjan.; Ivory Coast has an embassy in Accra.
Guinea	21 March 1961	Both countries established diplomatic relations on 21 March 1961, was were broken in September 1973 and re-established on 14 April 1978: Ivory Coast has an embassy in Conakry.; Guinea has an embassy in Abidjan.; Both countries are full members of the African Union, Mano River Union, Organisation internationale de la Francophonie.
Guinea-Bissau	9 October 1979	Both countries established diplomatic relations on 9 October 1979 when first Ambassador of Guinea-Bissau Mme Lucette de Andrade presented his credentials to president Cote d'Ivoire.
Kenya	10 September 1964	Both countries established diplomatic relations on 10 September 1964 when Mr. Honore Polneau, the Ivory Coast's Ambassador in Tanzania, has been nominated in addition as Ambassador to Kenya.
Liberia	31 July 1961	Both countries established diplomatic relations on 31 July 1961: Ivory Coast has an embassy in Monrovia.; Liberia has an embassy in Abidjan.; Both countries are full members of the African Union and Mano River Union.
Mali	16 April 1962	Both countries established diplomatic relations on 16 April 1962 when M. Amadou Hampate Ba has been appointed as Minister Plenipotentiary with the rank and prerogatives of Ambassador of Mali to Republic of Cote d'Ivoire (resident in Abidjan).: Ivory Coast has an embassy in Bamako.; Mali has an embassy in Abidjan and a consulate in Bouake.
Mozambique	11 December 2017	Both countries established diplomatic relations on 11 December 2017 when Ambassador of Cote d'Ivoire Bosson Assamoi has presented his credentials to President of Mozambique Filipe Jacinto Nyusi.
Niger	30 October 1973	Both countries established diplomatic relations on 30 October 1973 when M. Johson Edremoda, ambassador of Niger to Cote d'Ivoire, presented his letters of credence.
Nigeria	26 July 1961	Both countries established diplomatic relations on 26 July 1961: Ivory Coast has an embassy in Abuja, which also functions as the non-resident embassy to Benin.; Nigeria has an embassy in Abidjan.
Rwanda	15 March 1974	Both countries established diplomatic relations on 15 March 1974 when the first Rwandan ambassador to the Ivory Coast, Pierre Mudenge, presented his credentials to President Houphouet Boigny.
Sierra Leone	1962	Both countries established diplomatic relations in 1962 when has been accredited Ambassador of Cote d'Ivoire to Sierra Leone (resident in Monrovia) Mr. Pierre Coffi.
South Africa	21 May 1992	Both countries established diplomatic relations on 21 May 1992: Ivory Coast has an embassy in Pretoria.; South Africa has an embassy in Abidjan.
Sudan	13 April 1975	Both countries established diplomatic relations on 13 April 1975 when Ambassador of Sudan Mr. Ibrahim Mohamed Ali has presented his credentials to President of Ivory Coast Houphouet - Boigny.
Tanzania	3 July 1964	Both countries established diplomatic relations on 3 July 1964 when Honore Polneau first Ivory Coast ambassador to the United Republic of Tanganyika and Zanzibar presented his credentials to President Nyerere
Uganda	21 July 1966	Both countries established diplomatic relations on 21 July 1966 when was accredited first ambassador of Ivory Coast to Uganda (Resident in Addis Ababa) Mr. Honore Mambe Polneau

=== Americas ===
Country	Formal Relations Began	Notes
Canada	27 April 1962	See Canada–Ivory Coast relations Both countries established diplomatic relations on 27 April 1962: Canada has an embassy in Abidjan.; Ivory Coast has an embassy in Ottawa.
Mexico	13 November 1975	Both countries established diplomatic relations on 13 November 1975 See Ivory Coast–Mexico relations: Ivory Coast has an embassy in Mexico City.; Mexico is accredited to Ivory Coast from its embassy in Rabat, Morocco and maintains an honorary consulate in Abidjan.
Peru	18 August 1964	Both countries established diplomatic relations on 18 August 1964 when M. Enrique Pena Darrengha, Peru's first Ambassador to the Ivory Coast, presented his letters of credence.
United States	7 August 1960	Both countries established diplomatic relations on 7 August 1960 See Ivory Coast–United States relations: Ivory Coast has an embassy in Washington, D.C.; United States has an embassy in Abidjan.

=== Asia ===
Country	Formal Relations Began	Notes
Bangladesh	10 February 1975	Both countries established diplomatic relations on 10 February 1975 when Bangladesh's first Ambassador to the Ivory Coast, Mr. Anwrul Haq, has presented his credentials to President Houphouet - Boigny.
Cambodia	9 April 2008	Both countries established diplomatic relations on 9 April 2008: Guillaume Soro visited Cambodia and met with President of the National Assembly Heng Samrin.; The two countries agreed to strengthen their diplomatic ties.; Soro pledged to seek possibilities to cooperate in the agricultural sector with Cambodia.
China	2 March 1983	See China–Ivory Coast relations Both countries established diplomatic relations on 2 March 1983 According to Xavier Aurégan, PhD at the French Institute of Geopolitics, from 1983 to 2013, there are approximately 174 Chinese official development finance projects in Côte d'Ivoire. Of these 174 official development finance projects, 112 are approximately 12 billion euros. The most expensive project is the urban center in Abidjan (8.9 billion euros). In addition, infrastructure accounted for 86% of the Chinese public assistance. The majority of Chinese aid is granted during the Ivorian political crisis between 2002 and 2010. Under Laurent Gbagbo, 69% of aid is thus assigned. In Abidjan, Chinese nationals are about 2500. They mainly occur in the trade, Adjamé, or restoration, Cocody. They created about 100 companies.: China has an embassy in Abidjan.; Ivory Coast has an embassy in Beijing and a consulate-general in Guangzhou.
India	5 November 1961	See India–Ivory Coast relations Both countries established diplomatic relations on 5 November 1961 The bilateral relations between the Republic of India and the Ivory Coast have considerably expanded in recent years as India seeks to develop an extensive commercial and strategic partnership in the West African region . The Indian embassy in Abidjan was opened in 1979. Ivory Coast opened its resident mission in New Delhi in September 2004. Both nations are currently fostering efforts to increase trade, investments and economic cooperation.
Indonesia	4 June 1982	Both countries established diplomatic relations on 4 June 1982: Indonesia is accredited to Ivory Coast through its embassy in Dakar, Senegal.; Ivory Coast is accredited to Indonesia through its embassy in Seoul, South Korea.
Israel	24 May 1961	Both countries established diplomatic relations on 24 May 1961. Ivory Coast broken diplomatic relations with Israel 8 November 1973. Both countries re-established diplomatic relations on 12 February 1986
South Korea	23 July 1961	Both countries established diplomatic relations on 23 July 1961: Ivory Coast is the first country in Africa to establish formal relations with South Korea, In August 1986 Korean Minister of Foreign Affairs Lee Won-kyung paid a visit to Ivory Coast. In May 1991, Special Envoy of the Korean President Kim Chang-hoon visited Ivory Coast. In June 1994, Special Envoy of the President Kim Chong-ho visited Ivory Coast. In January 1999 Korean Minister of Foreign Affairs Hong Soon-young visited Ivory Coast and in February 2010 Korean Deputy Minister for Political Affairs Lee Yong-joon also paid a visit to Ivory Coast.; Ivory Coast has an embassy in Seoul.; South Korea has an embassy in Abidjan.
Taiwan	20 July 1963 unofficial relation (Now)	Taiwan had full formal relations with Ivory Coast from 1963 to 1983 when diplomatic relations were served after Ivory Coast switched relations to China.; Ivory Coast–Taiwan relations are conducted on an unofficial level, as Ivory Coast adheres to a one-China policy and officially recognises the People's Republic of China only. Since 1992, Taiwan maintains a representative office in Abidjan.
Turkey	14 July 1964	See Ivory Coast–Turkey relations Both countries established diplomatic relations on 14 July 1964: Ivory Coast has an embassy in Ankara.; Turkey has an embassy in Abidjan.; Trade volume between the two countries was 409.7 million USD in 2019 (Ivory Coast's exports/imports: 188.8/220.9 million USD).; There are direct flights from Istanbul to Abidjan since July 2012.
Vietnam	6 October 1975	Both countries established diplomatic relations on 6 October 1975: Vietnam is accredited to Ivory Coast through a non-resident embassy based in Rabat, Morocco and an honorary consulate in Abidjan.; Ivory Coast is accredited to Vietnam through a non-resident embassy based in Beijing, China and an honorary consulate in Ho Chi Minh City.; In 2019, Ivory Coast, along with the Philippines, has become the main importers of Vietnamese rice.

=== Europe ===
Country	Formal Relations Began	Notes
France	8 August 1960	See France–Ivory Coast relations Both countries established diplomatic relations on 8 August 1960 Despite electoral wrangling, Ivory Coast continues to maintain extremely close relations with France. President Houphouët-Boigny, who was a minister in the French colonial government prior to independence, insisted that the connection be maintained. President Chirac visited Ivory Coast soon after his election in 1995, followed by the French secretary of state and the ministers of foreign affairs and defense. Examples of Franco-Ivorian cooperation are numerous. French is Ivory Coast's official language. Ivorian security is enhanced by a brigade of French marines stationed in Abidjan. Some 20,000 French expatriates continue to make their home in Ivory Coast, and the country's currency, the CFA franc, is tied to the French franc. France maintains a military base at Port Bouët and has assisted in the restructuring of the Ivorian armed forces. France was the first country to recognize the victory of President Gbagbo in the October 2000 elections. France was also instrumental in the military efforts in the country during the 2002-2003 civil conflict. In February 2009, the French government decided to withdraw half of the 1,800 French troops currently stationed in Ivory Coast; the French president saying "The security risk in Ivory Coast has abated and waiting for elections whose timing remains uncertain no longer justifies the maintenance of a full military presence".: France has an embassy in Abidjan.; Ivory Coast has an embassy in Paris and a consulate-general in Lyon.
Germany	7 August 1960	Both countries established diplomatic relations on 7 August 1960 See Germany–Ivory Coast relations: Germany has an embassy in Abidjan.; Ivory Coast has an embassy in Berlin.
Russia	23 January 1967	See Ivory Coast–Russia relations Both countries established diplomatic relations on 23 January 1967 Russia works on UN missions to help the people of Ivory Coast. The help is sometimes done from the Russian embassy in Abidjan, but is also done from the embassy in Accra, Ghana. From these point of view, Russia regarded the outcome of the extraordinary summit held in Dakar, Senegal, of the Economic Community for West African States.
Spain	12 June 1964	See Ivory Coast–Spain relations Both countries established diplomatic relations on 12 June 1964: Ivory Coast has an embassy in Madrid.; Spain has an embassy in Abidjan.
United Kingdom	12 October 1960	See Ivory Coast–United Kingdom relations British Foreign Office Minister Mark Simmonds with Ivorian Prime Minister Daniel Kablan Duncan in London, June 2013. The UK established diplomatic relations with the United Kingdom on 12 October 1960.: Ivory Coast maintains an embassy in London.; The United Kingdom is accredited to Ivory Coast through its embassy in Abidjan.; Both countries share common membership of the Atlantic Co-operation Pact, the International Criminal Court, and the World Trade Organization. Bilaterally the two countries have an Economic Partnership Agreement, a High Level Prosperity Partnership, and an Investment Agreement.

=== Oceania ===
Country	Formal Relations Began	Notes
Australia	3 July 1975	Both countries established diplomatic relations on 3 July 1975: Australia's High Commission in Accra, Functions as the non-resident embassy to Ivory Coast.; Ivory Coast has an embassy in Canberra.

== See also ==
- List of diplomatic missions in Ivory Coast
- List of diplomatic missions of Ivory Coast
