= Ivory Coast–Soviet Union relations =

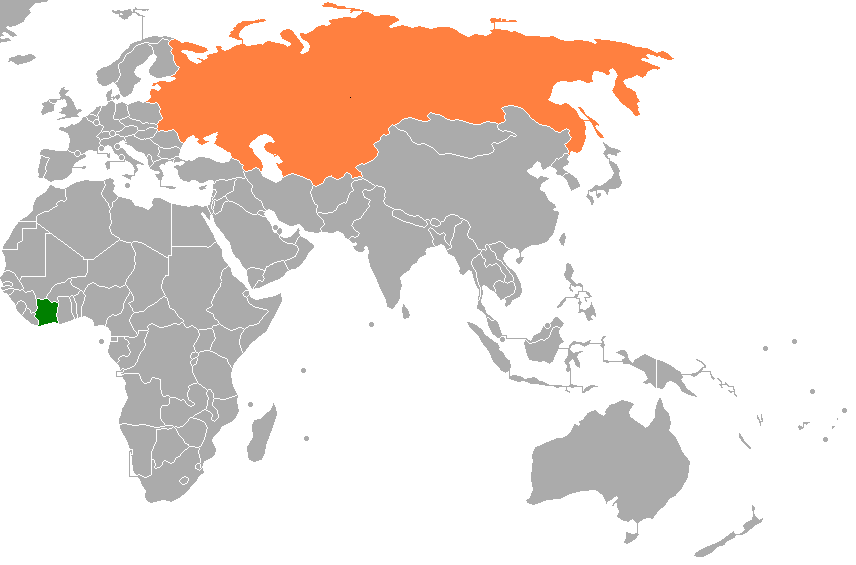

- Ivory Coast: Soviet Union

Ivory Coast–Soviet Union relations were the bilateral relations between Ivory Coast and Soviet Union. Overall, the Ivorian-Soviet relations were sporadic and frosty as the Ivorian president Félix Houphouët-Boigny mistrusted the Soviet Union and had a negative view of the Soviet role in Africa.

== 1967–1969 ==
The Soviet Union had declared its recognition of the independence of Ivory Coast and offered the new state diplomatic relations in a telegram issued on August 6, 1960 (one day before independence of Ivory Coast was declared). The Soviet Union had begun to import cocoa beans from Ivory Coast in 1959, but this trade was discontinued in 1961.

However, in the early phase of Ivorian independence Soviet analysts classified the Ivorian government as 'reactionary'. By the mid-1960s, there was a shift in Soviet attitudes towards Ivory Coast. The new Soviet ambition to seek development of contacts with Ivory Coast could be seen as part of a wider strategy, directed towards enhancing contacts to regionally important moderate states in the Third World (another example in West Africa was Nigeria).

Another factor that hampered the development of Ivorian-Soviet links was that the Soviet Union had close links with Guinea, ruled by Houphouët-Boigny's adversary Ahmed Sékou Touré. Guinea was accused of fomenting opposition inside Ivory Coast, and there were suspicions that the Soviet Union had given its support to these activities. The Soviet-Guinean cooperation was however broken off. A mutual agreement to establish diplomatic relations between Ivory Coast and the Soviet Union was announced on January 23, 1967. In November the same year the first Soviet ambassador to Ivory Coast, Sergey Petrov, was appointed.

On May 30, 1969, Ivory Coast declared that it severed the relations with the Soviet Union, as allegations were directed that Petrov had given direct support to a 1968 protest at the National University of Ivory Coast.

== 1986–1990 ==
The two states did not restore ties until February 1986. The reassumption of bilateral relations could be attributed to two factors. On one hand Houphouët-Boigny had begun to embrace a more active foreign policy, including a more pragmatic attitude towards the Soviet Union. Furthermore, at the time Houphouët-Boigny was active in seeking increased international recognition. The Soviet Union sent Boris Minakov as its ambassador to Ivory Coast. He served as ambassador until 1990.

== See also ==
- Ivory Coast–Russia relations
- Foreign relations of Ivory Coast
- Foreign relations of Russia
