= List of diplomatic missions of Ivory Coast =

This is a list of diplomatic missions of Ivory Coast, excluding honorary consulates.

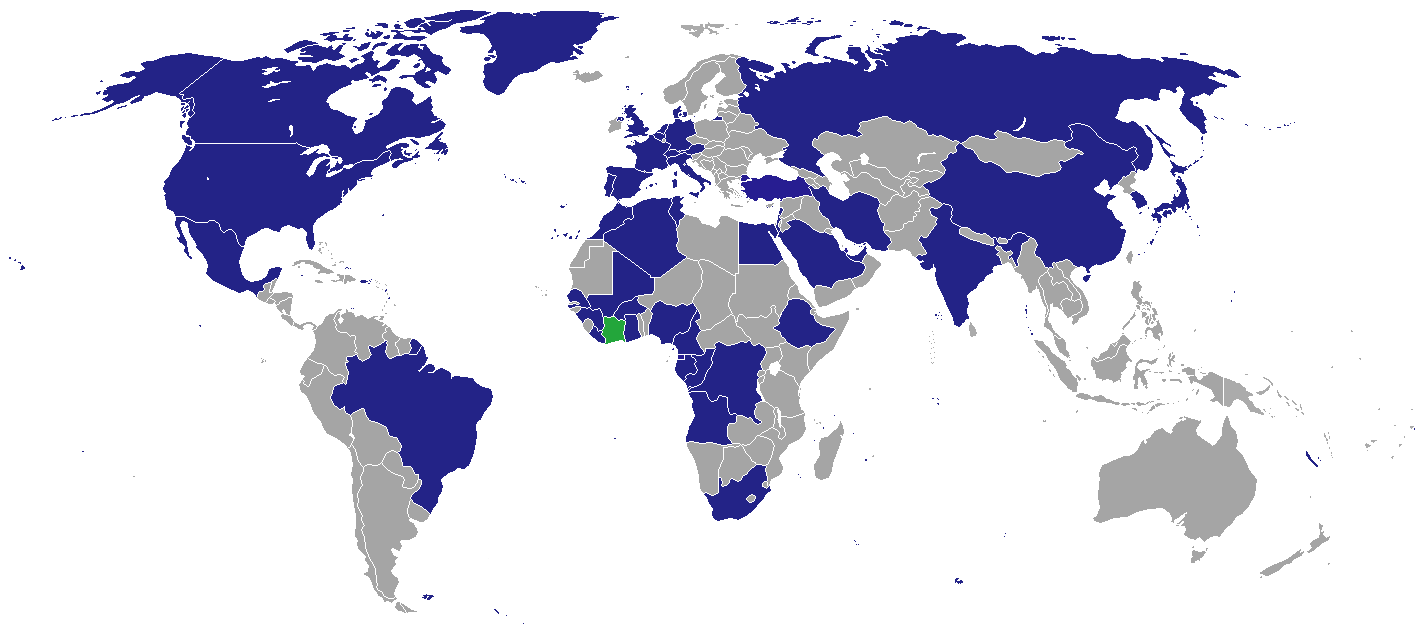
Map of diplomatic missions of Ivory Coast

== Africa ==
Host country	Host city	Mission	Concurrent accreditation	Ref.
Algeria	Algiers	Embassy		
Angola	Luanda	Embassy	Countries: Mozambique; Zambia	
Burkina Faso	Ouagadougou	Embassy	Countries: Niger	
Cameroon	Yaoundé	Embassy	Countries: Central African Republic	
Congo-Brazzaville	Brazzaville	Embassy		
Congo-Kinshasa	Kinshasa	Embassy	Countries: Burundi; Rwanda	
Egypt	Cairo	Embassy	Countries: Eritrea; Sudan	
Equatorial Guinea	Malabo	Embassy		
Ethiopia	Addis Ababa	Embassy	Countries: Djibouti; Kenya; Somalia; South Sudan; Tanzania; Uganda; International Organizations: African Union; United Nations Economic Commission for Africa	
Gabon	Libreville	Embassy	Countries: São Tomé and Príncipe	
Ghana	Accra	Embassy	Countries: Benin; Togo	
Guinea	Conakry	Embassy		
Liberia	Monrovia	Embassy	Countries: Sierra Leone	
Mali	Bamako	Embassy		
Morocco	Rabat	Embassy		
Nigeria	Abuja	Embassy	International Organizations: Economic Community of West African States	
Senegal	Dakar	Embassy	Countries: Gambia; Guinea-Bissau; Mauritania	
South Africa	Pretoria	Embassy	Countries: Botswana; Comoros; Eswatini; Lesotho; Madagascar; Mauritius; Namibia; Seychelles; Zimbabwe	
Tunisia	Tunis	Embassy		

== Americas ==
Host country	Host city	Mission	Concurrent accreditation	Ref.
Brazil	Brasília	Embassy	Countries: Argentina; Bolivia; Chile; Colombia; Equador; Guyana; Paraguay; Peru; Suriname; Uruguay; Venezuela	
Canada	Ottawa	Embassy		
Mexico	Mexico City	Embassy	Countries: Belize; Costa Rica; Cuba; El Salvador; Guatemala; Honduras; Nicaragua	
United States	Washington D.C.	Embassy	Countries: Bahamas; Trinidad and Tobago	
United States	New York City	Consulate-General	Countries: Bahamas; Trinidad and Tobago	

== Asia ==
Host country	Host city	Mission	Concurrent accreditation	Ref.
China	Beijing	Embassy	Countries: Cambodia; Laos; Myanmar; North Korea; Thailand; Vietnam	
China	Guangzhou	Consulate-General	Countries: Cambodia; Laos; Myanmar; North Korea; Thailand; Vietnam	
India	New Delhi	Embassy	Countries: Bangladesh; Sri Lanka	
Iran	Tehran	Embassy	Countries: Azerbaijan	
Israel	Tel Aviv	Embassy		
Japan	Tokyo	Embassy	Countries: Australia; Indonesia; Philippines; Singapore	
Lebanon	Beirut	Embassy		
Qatar	Doha	Embassy		
Saudi Arabia	Riyadh	Embassy	Countries: Bahrain; Kuwait; Oman	
Saudi Arabia	Jeddah	Consulate-General	Countries: Bahrain; Kuwait; Oman	
South Korea	Seoul	Embassy	Countries: Brunei; Malaysia	
Turkey	Ankara	Embassy	Countries: Georgia	
United Arab Emirates	Abu Dhabi	Embassy		

== Europe ==
Host country	Host city	Mission	Concurrent accreditation	Ref.
Austria	Vienna	Embassy	Countries: Bosnia and Herzegovina; Croatia; Hungary; Romania; Serbia; Slovakia; Slovenia; International Organizations: United Nations	
Belgium	Brussels	Embassy	Countries: Luxembourg; International Organizations: European Union	
Denmark	Copenhagen	Embassy	Countries: Estonia; Finland; Iceland; Latvia; Lithuania; Norway; Sweden	
France	Paris	Embassy	Countries: Monaco	
France	Lyon	Consulate-General	Countries: Monaco	
Germany	Berlin	Embassy	Countries: Czechia; Poland	
Holy See	Rome (Note: The Ivorian Embassy to the Holy See is located outside Vatican territory in Rome.)	Embassy	Sovereign entity: Sovereign Military Order of Malta	
Italy	Rome	Embassy	Countries: Albania; Bulgaria; Cyprus; Greece; Kosovo; Malta; Montenegro; San Marino; International Organizations: Food and Agriculture Organization; International Fund for Agricultural Development; World Food Programme	
Netherlands	The Hague	Embassy		
Portugal	Lisbon	Embassy		
Russia	Moscow	Embassy	Countries: Armenia	
Spain	Madrid	Embassy		
Switzerland	Bern	Embassy		
United Kingdom	London	Embassy	Countries: Ireland	

== Multilateral organizations ==
Organization	Host city	Host country	Mission	Concurrent accreditation	Ref.
Francophonie	Paris	France	Representation		
United Nations	New York City	United States	Permanent Mission		
United Nations	Geneva	Switzerland	Permanent Mission		
UNESCO	Paris	France	Delegation		

== Gallery ==
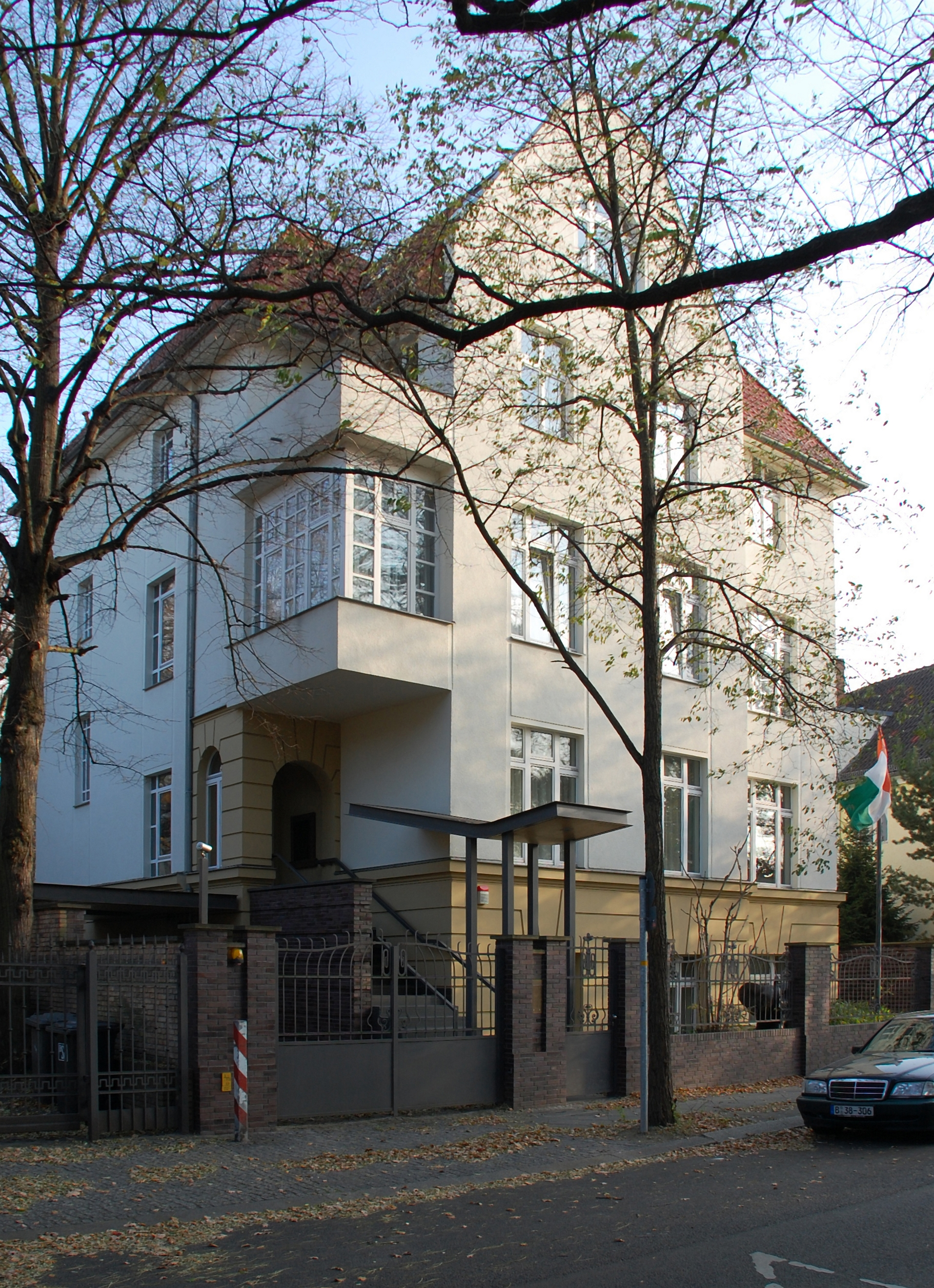
Embassy in Berlin

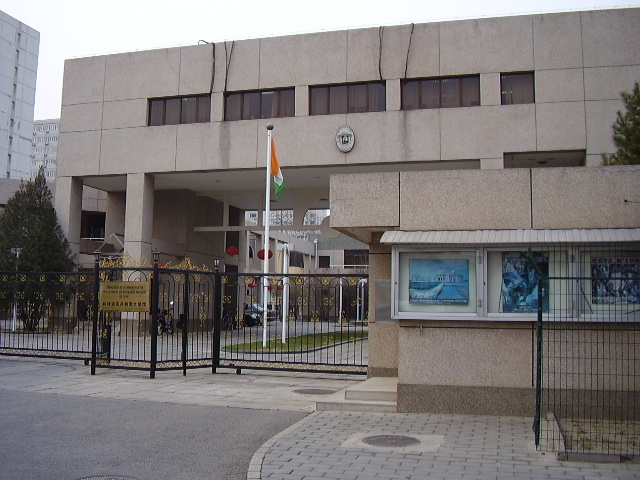
Embassy in Beijing

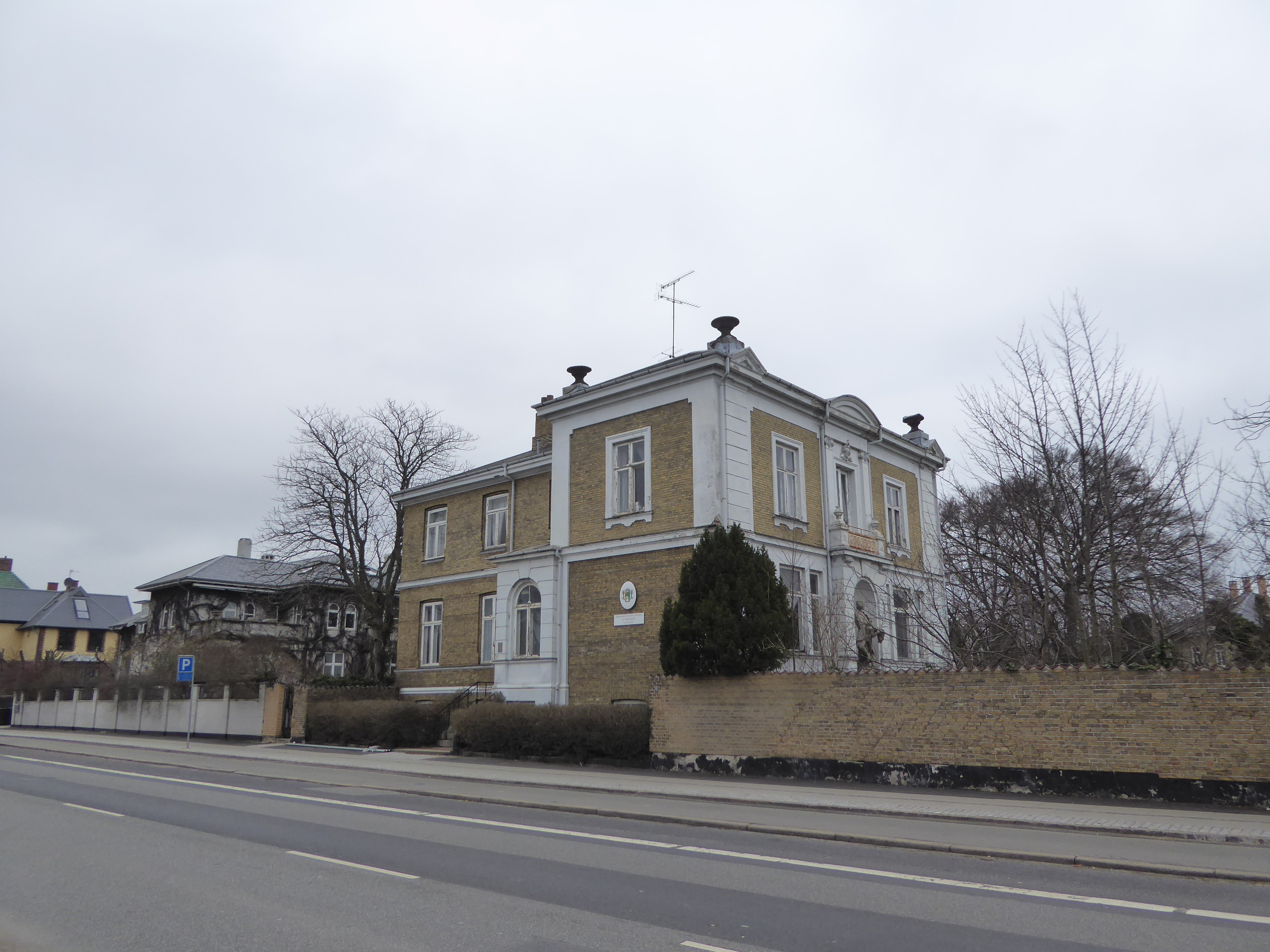
Embassy in Copenhagen

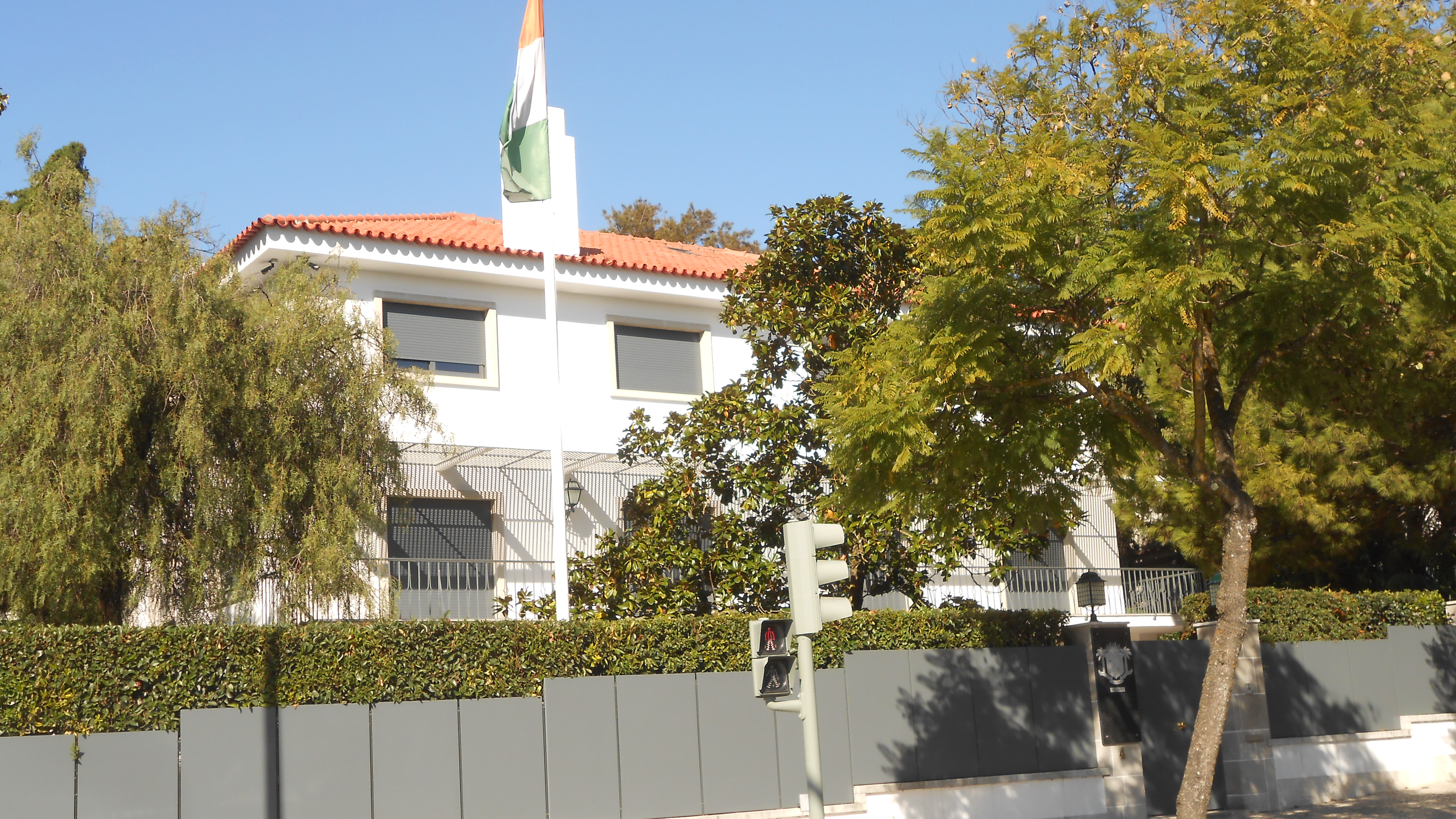
Embassy in Lisbon

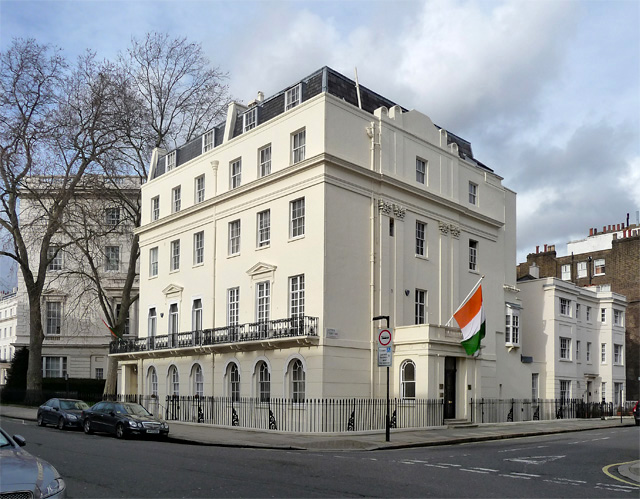
Embassy in London

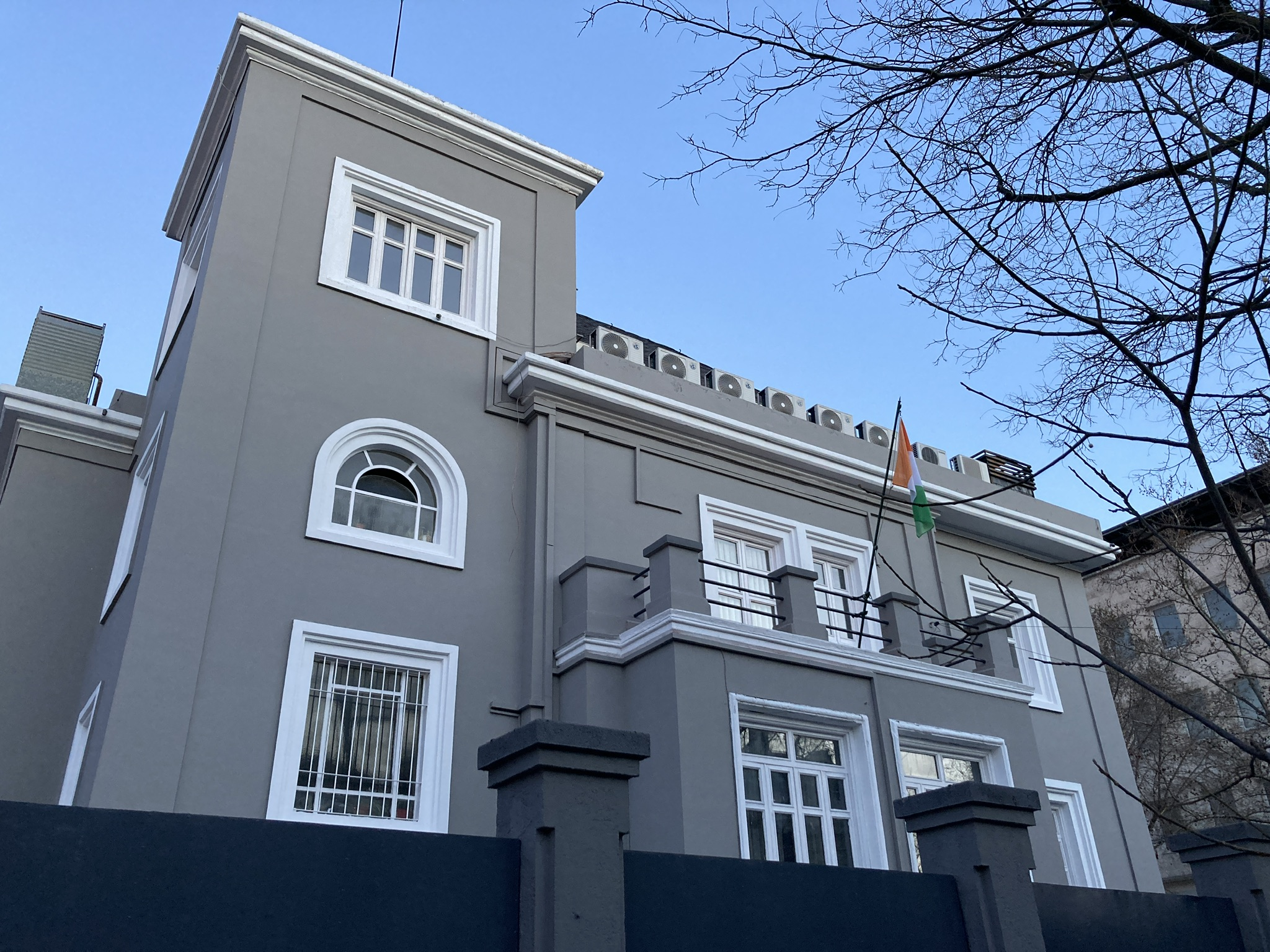
Embassy in Madrid

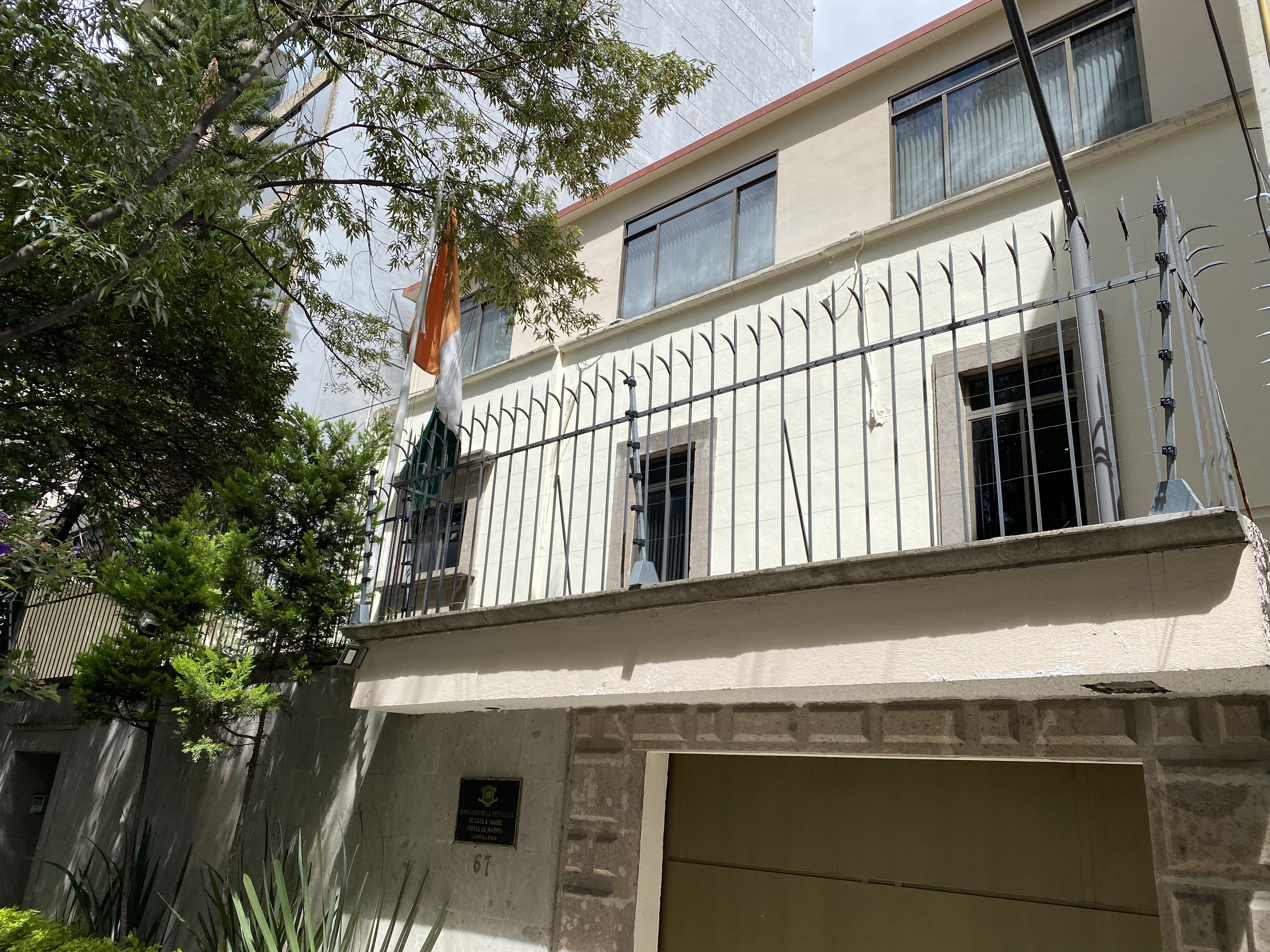
Embassy in Mexico City

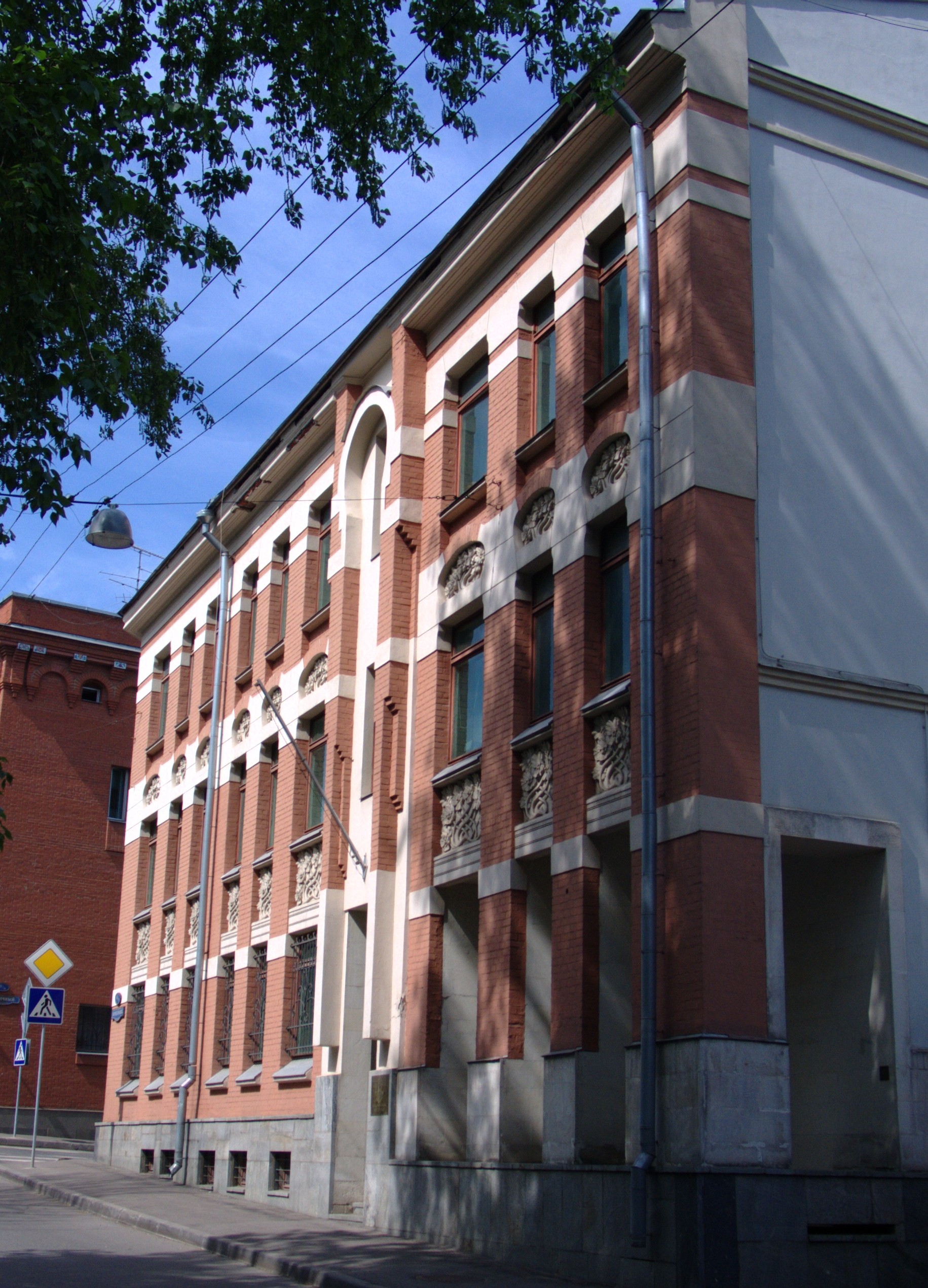
Embassy in Moscow

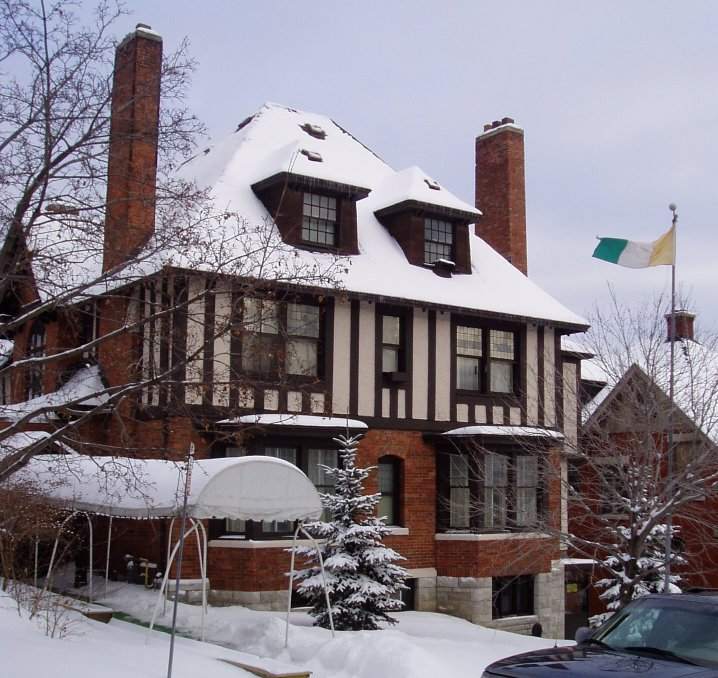
Embassy in Ottawa

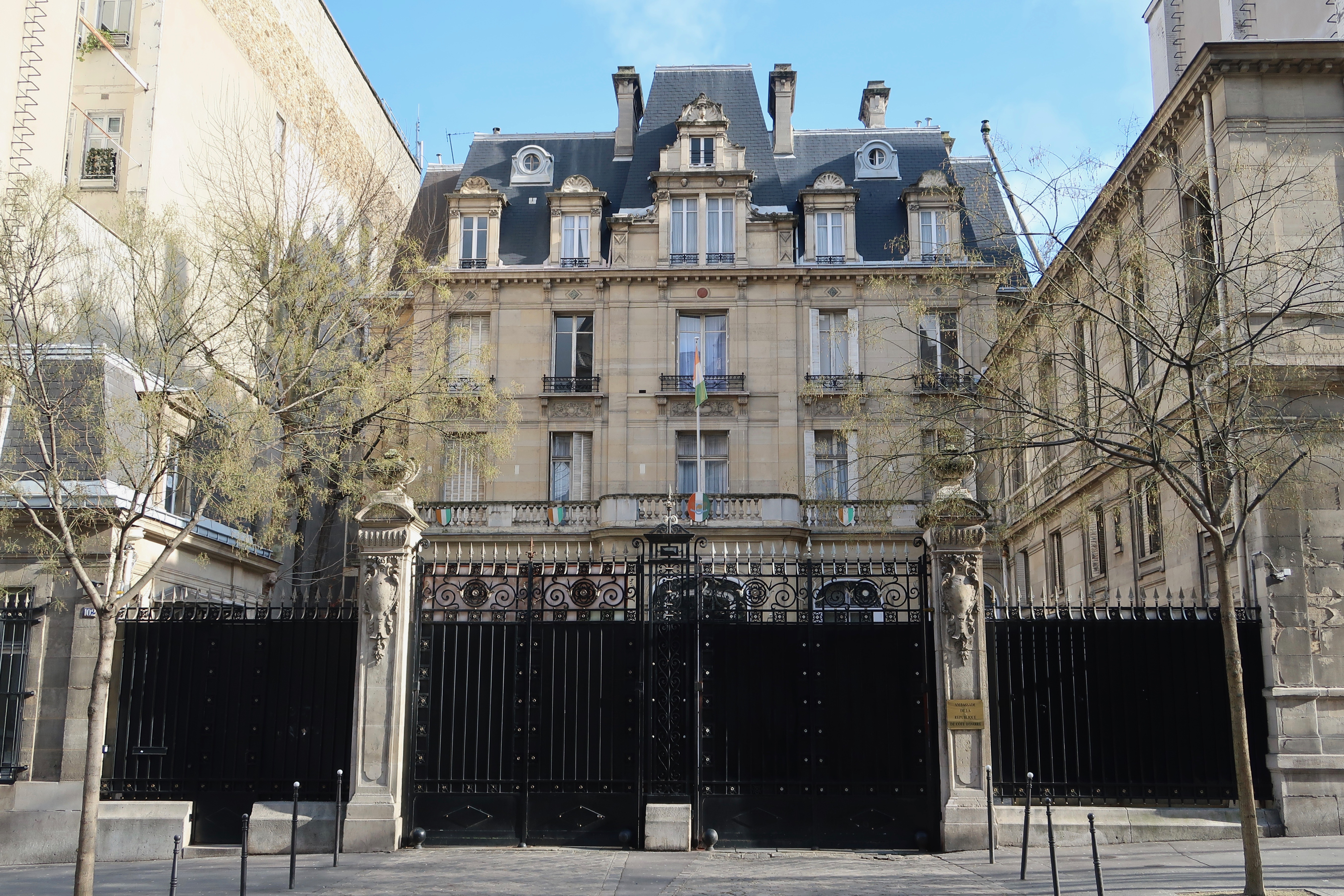
Embassy in Paris

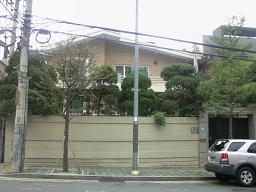
Embassy in Seoul

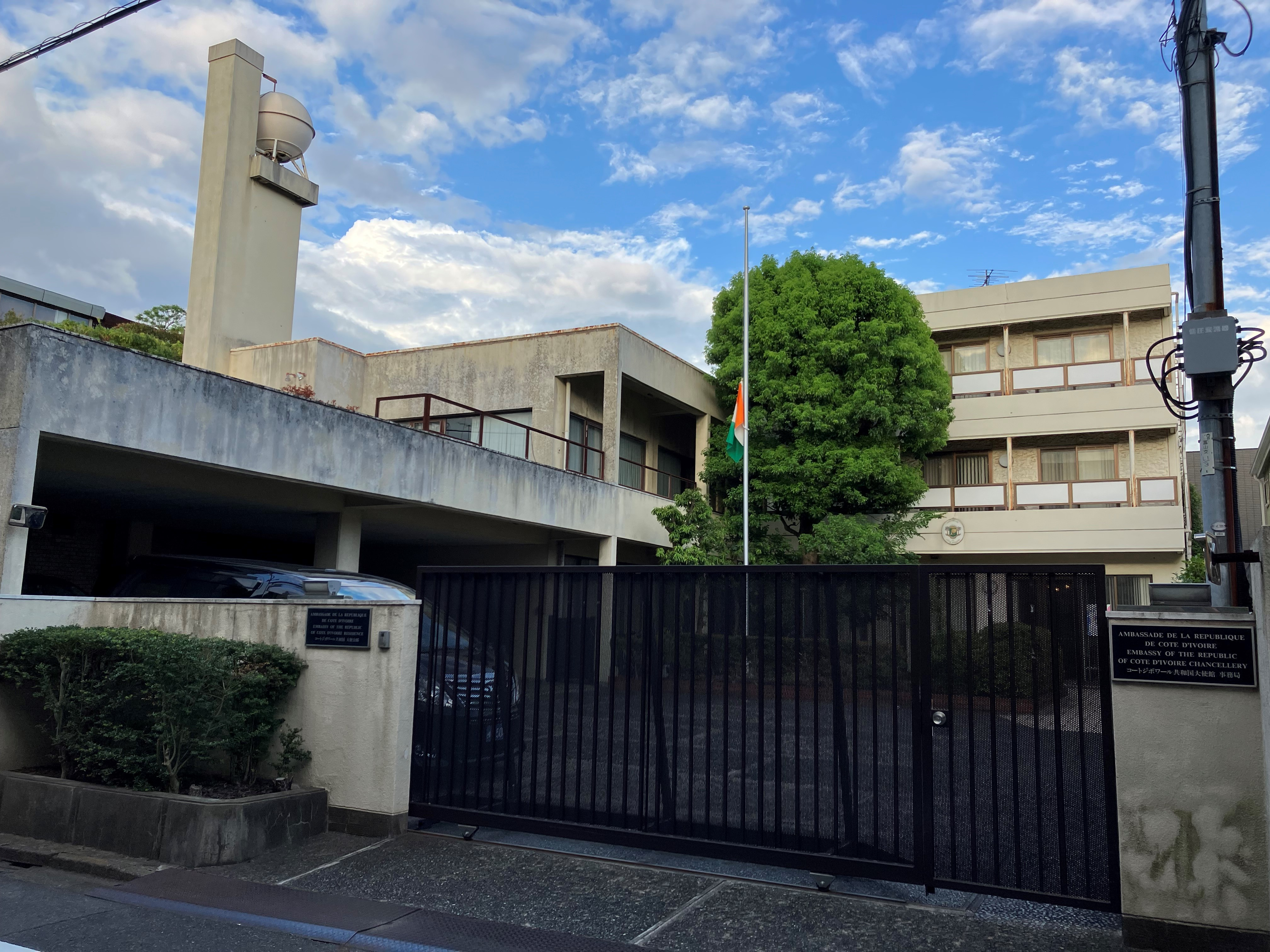
Embassy in Tokyo

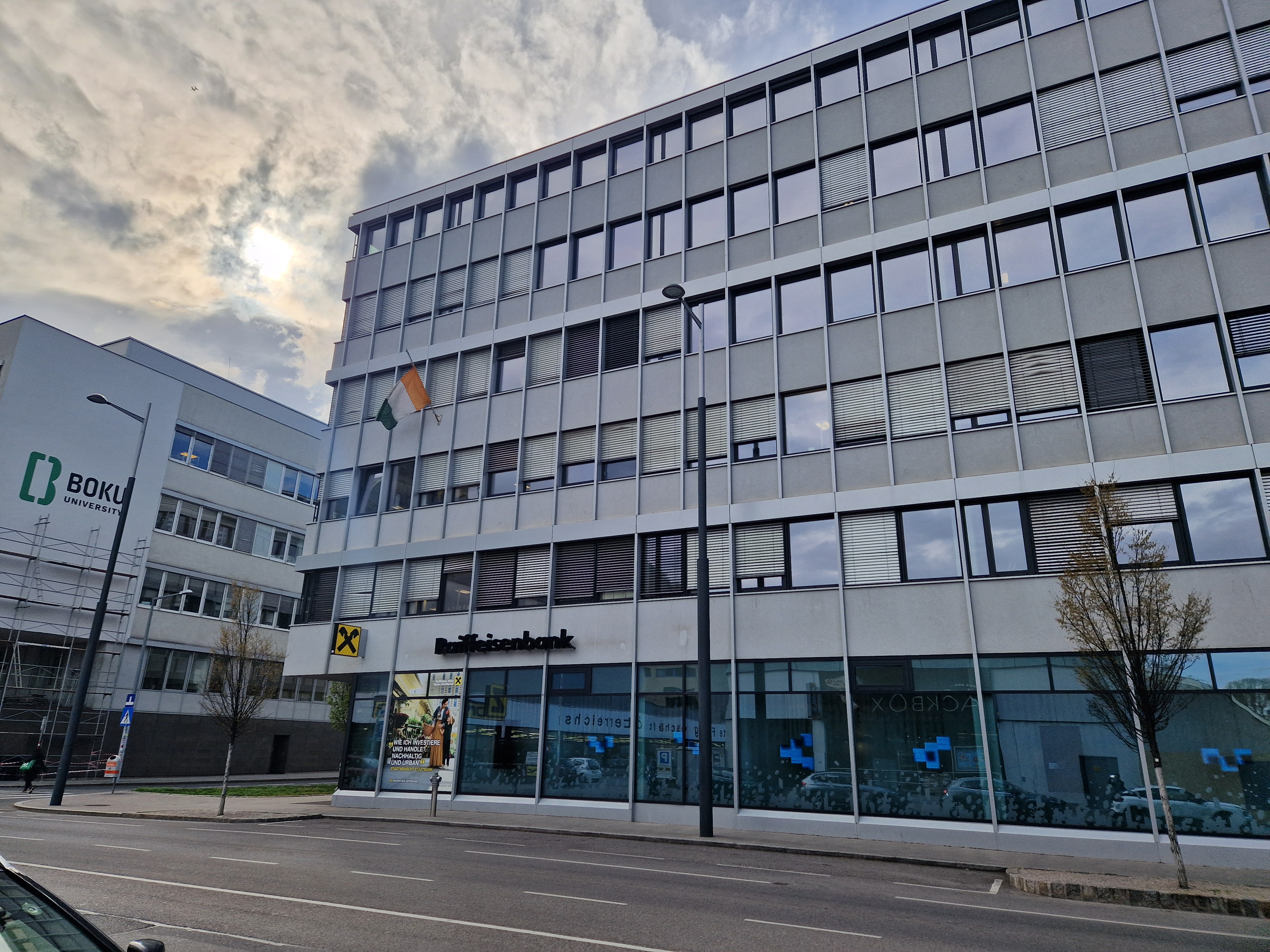
Embassy in Vienna

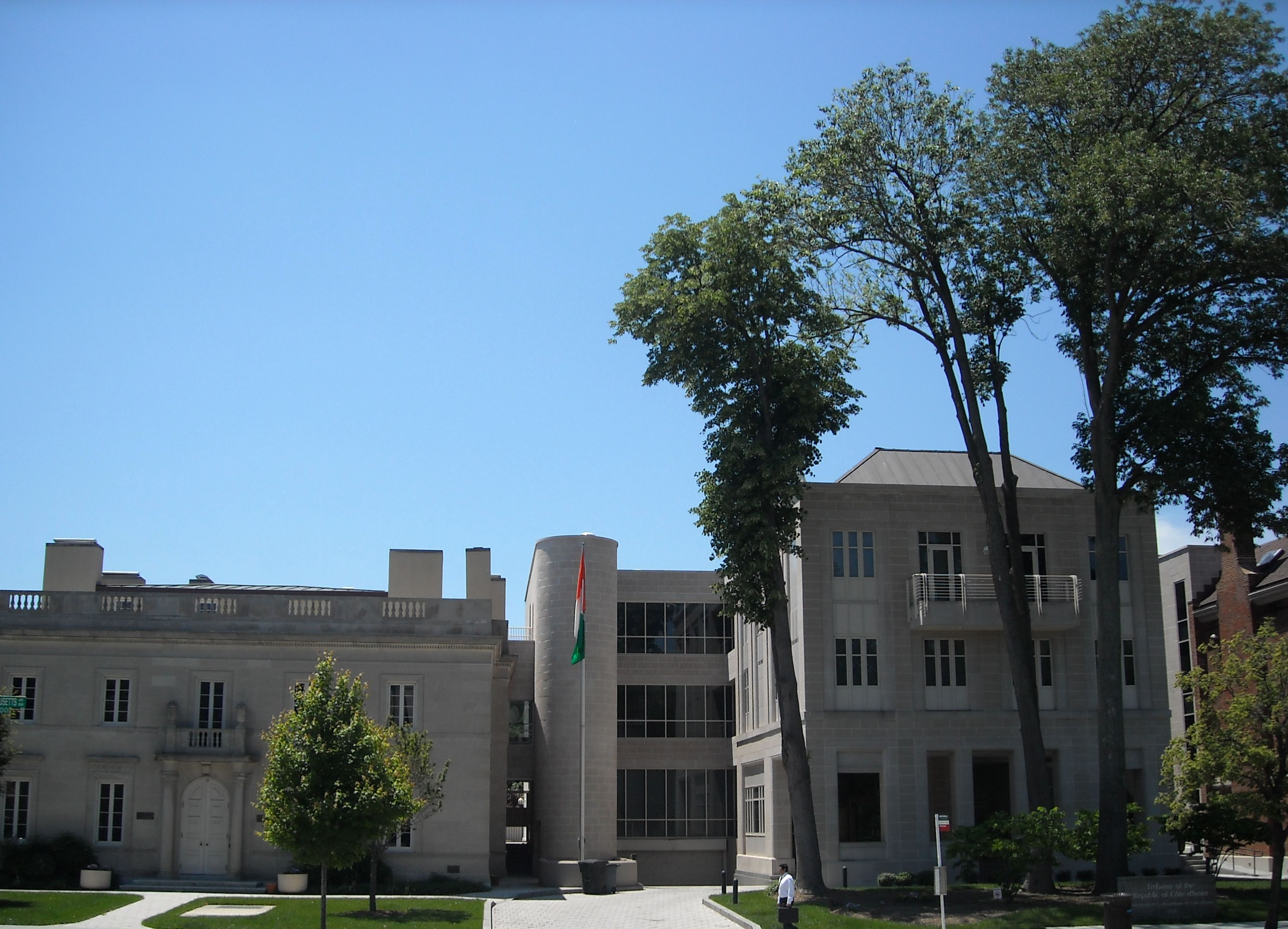
Embassy in Washington, D.C.

Former Embassies:

Australia (Canberra) (Embassy closed on 8 October 2018)

Chad (N'Djamena) (Embassy closed on 8 October 2018)

Libya (Tripoli, Libya) (Embassy closed unknown)

== See also ==
- Foreign relations of Ivory Coast
- List of diplomatic missions in Ivory Coast
- Visa policy of Ivory Coast
