= List of diplomatic missions in Ivory Coast =

This article lists the diplomatic missions in Ivory Coast (Côte d'Ivoire). At present, Abidjan, the largest city in the country, currently hosts 53 embassies. Meanwhile, the capital Yamoussoukro hosts no embassies.

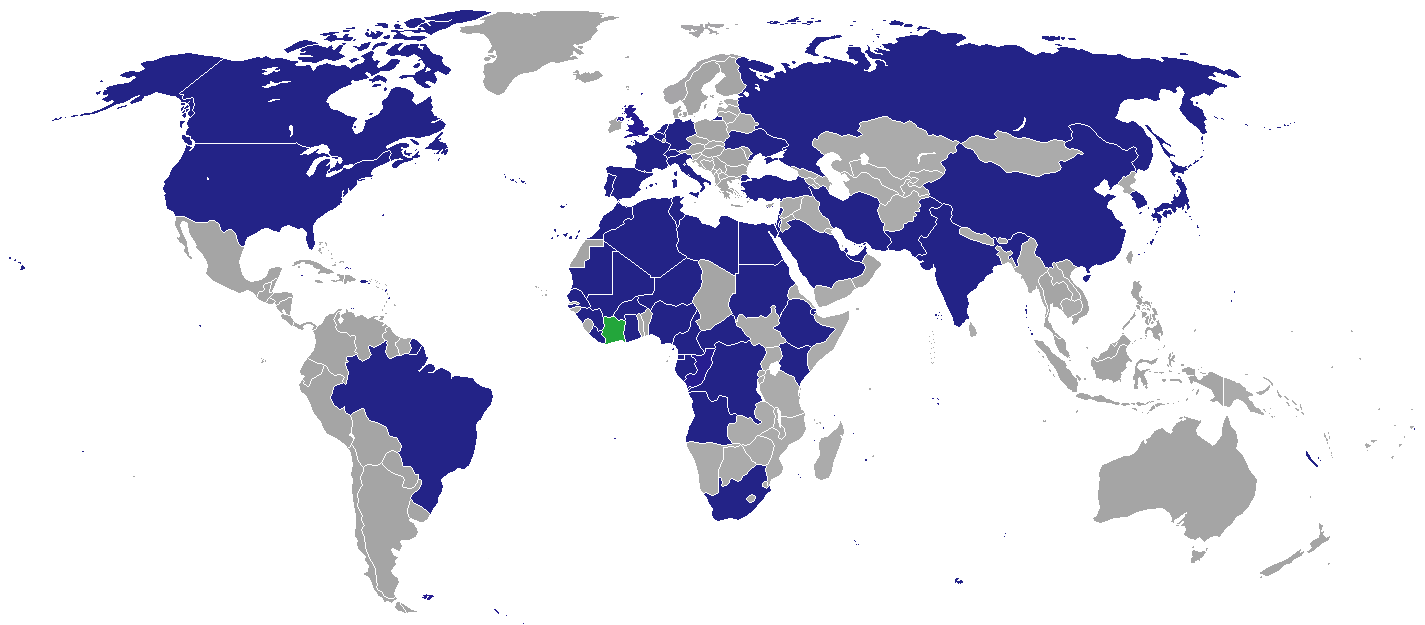
Map of diplomatic missions in Ivory Coast

== Diplomatic missions in Abidjan ==
=== Embassies ===
1. Algeria
2. Angola
3. Belgium
4. Brazil
5. Burkina Faso
6. Cameroon
7. Canada
8. Central African Republic
9. China
10. Congo-Brazzaville
11. Congo-Kinshasa
12. Djibouti
13. Egypt
14. Equatorial Guinea
15. Ethiopia
16. France
17. Gabon
18. Germany
19. Ghana
20. Guinea
21. Holy See
22. India
23. Iran
24. Israel
25. Italy
26. Japan
27. Kenya
28. Lebanon
29. Liberia
30. Libya
31. Mali
32. Mauritania
33. Morocco
34. Netherlands
35. Niger
36. Nigeria
37. Pakistan
38. Palestine
39. Portugal
40. Qatar
41. Russia
42. Saudi Arabia
43. Senegal
44. South Africa
45. South Korea
46. Sovereign Military Order of Malta
47. Spain
48. Sudan
49. Switzerland
50. Tunisia
51. Turkey
52. Ukraine
53. United Arab Emirates
54. United Kingdom
55. United States

=== Other missions or delegations ===
- (Europe) European Union (Delegation)
- Taiwan (Representative Office)

== Consular missions ==
=== Bouake ===
- Burkina Faso (Consulate-General)
- Mali

=== Soubré ===
- Burkina Faso (Consulate-General)

== Non-resident embassies ==
=== Resident in Accra, Ghana ===
- Australia
- Denmark
- Namibia
- Rwanda
- Togo
- Zambia

=== Resident in Abuja, Nigeria ===
- Argentina
- Philippines
- Poland
- Slovakia
- Tanzania
- Trinidad & Tobago

=== Resident in Dakar, Senegal ===
- Austria
- Cape Verde
- Colombia
- Finland
- Greece
- Indonesia
- Romania
- Somalia
- Thailand

=== Resident in Conakry, Guinea ===
- Cuba
- Malaysia

=== Resident in other cities ===
- Costa Rica (Paris)
- Croatia (Rabat)
- Ireland (Monrovia)
- Maldives (London)
- Mexico (Rabat)
- Paraguay (Pretoria)
- Serbia (New York City)
- Seychelles (Addis Ababa)
- Sierra Leone (Monrovia)
- Sweden (Stockholm)
- Venezuela (Cotonou)
- Vietnam (Rabat)

== Closed missions ==
Host city	Sending country	Mission	Year closed	Ref.
Abidjan	Argentina	Embassy (Note: Resident in Abuja, Nigeria)	1991	
Abidjan	Austria	Embassy (Note: Resident in Dakar, Senegal)	1994	
Abidjan	Benin	Consulate-General	2020	
Abidjan	Chile	Embassy	1991	
Abidjan	Czech Republic	Embassy	2005	
Abidjan	Norway	Embassy	2011	
Abidjan	Romania	Embassy	1983	
Abidjan	South Vietnam	Embassy	1975	
Abidjan	Sweden	Embassy (Note: Resident in Stockholm, Sweden)	2007	
Abidjan	Uruguay	Embassy	1989	
Bouaké	France	Consulate	1992	

== See also ==
- Foreign relations of Ivory Coast
- List of diplomatic missions of Ivory Coast
