= Ivory Coast–Spain relations =

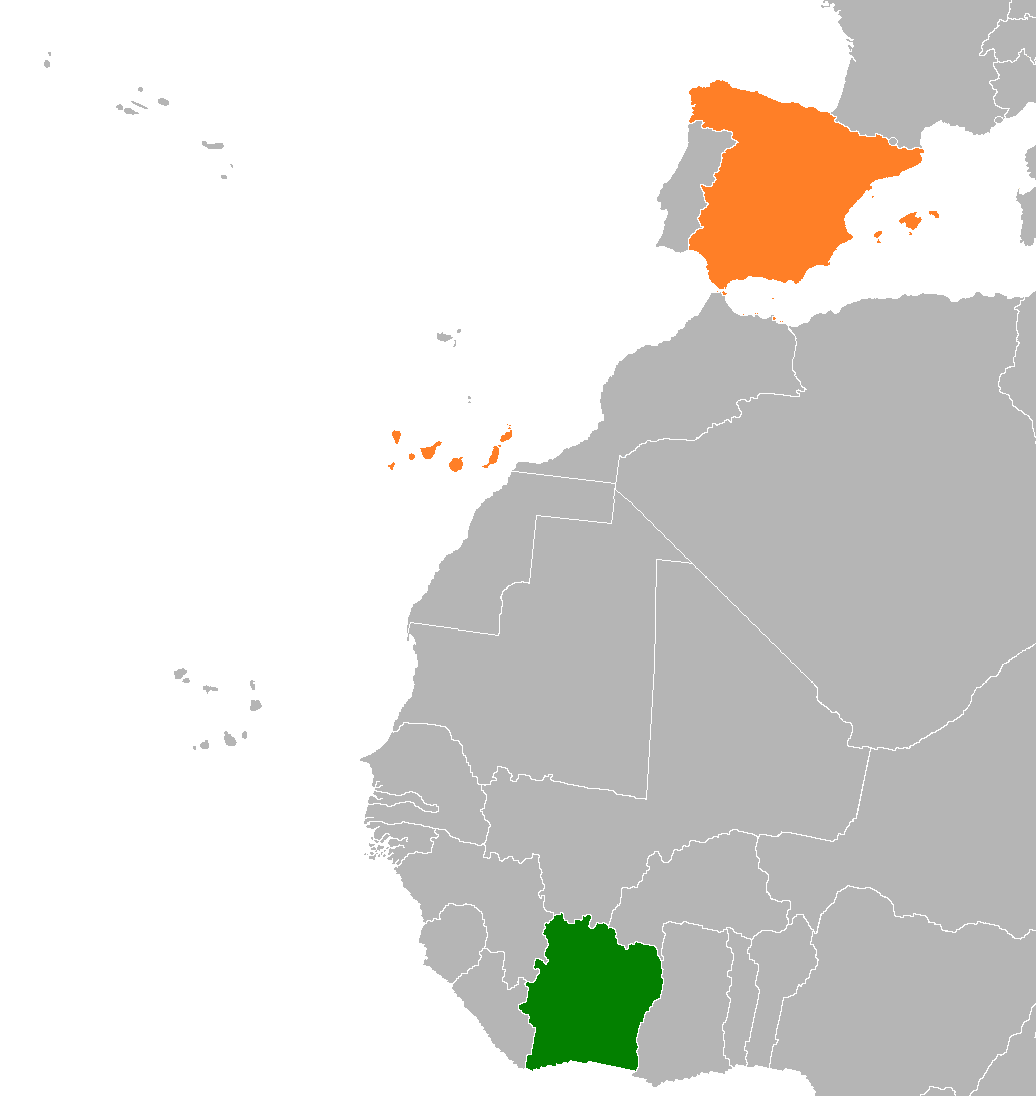
- Ivory Coast: Spain

Ivory Coast–Spain relations are the bilateral and diplomatic relations between these two countries. Ivory Coast has an embassy in Madrid, and honorary consulates in Barcelona, Bilbao, in Las Palmas de Gran Canaria, Málaga, Murcia, Oviedo, Seville, Tarragona, Valencia, Valladolid, Zaragoza and La Coruña. Spain has an embassy in Abidjan. The Canary Islands are geographically closer to the northern border of Ivory Coast than to some parts of mainland Spain.

== Diplomatic relations ==
In the political and institutional sphere, relations between Spain and Ivory Coast are cordial and fluid. The Ivorian State highly valued the permanence of Spain in the country throughout the entire post-election conflict, including during the most violent phases.

For Côte d'Ivoire, the role of Spain and the Spanish economy in the field of the European Union is especially relevant. An increase is perceived of the Spanish presence in Africa, especially in West Africa. In 1998 Spain appeared as the first "development partner" with Côte d'Ivoire and granted this country the priority consideration for its international cooperation.

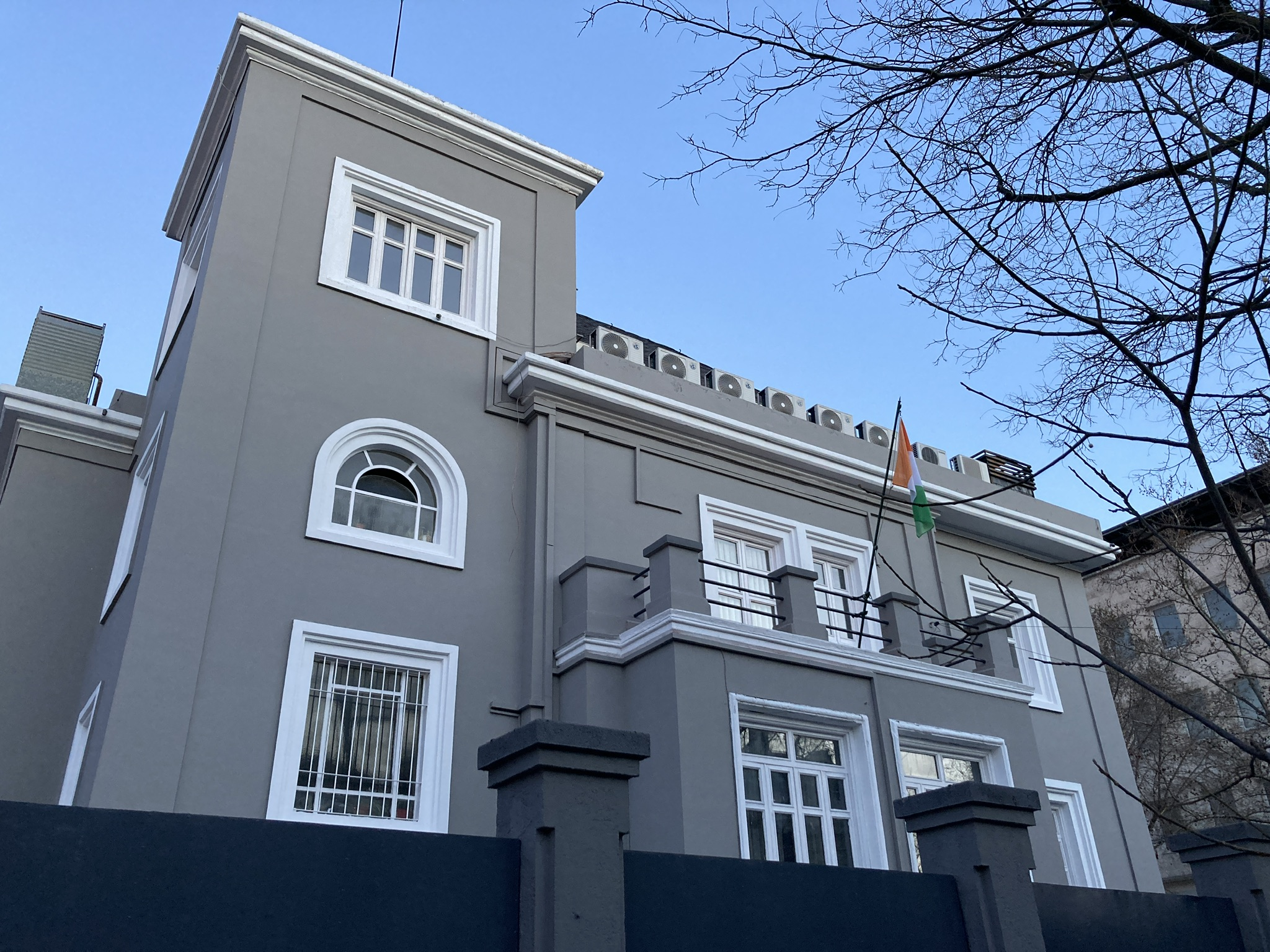
Embassy of Ivory Coast, Madrid

Successive Master Plans of International Cooperation no longer considered Ivory Coast as a priority country for our cooperation. The commercial and economic presence of Spain in Côte d'Ivoire is still reduced, but it is increasing continuously and progressively, and now that the political situation has normalized, business returns to normal. In June 2014 the Economic and Commercial Office of the Spanish Embassy in Abidjan was reopened.

== Economic relations ==
Spain's trade balance with Ivory Coast has traditionally been deficient for Spain, due to the considerable volume of imports of raw materials from Ivory Coast.

== Cooperation ==
Côte d'Ivoire has not been a country included in the geographical priorities of the Master Cooperation Plans (nor in that of 2013–2016). However, Spain does have a debt conversion program with Ivory Coast, under negotiation. There is also Spanish cooperation in the country through two channels: cooperation financed by the Spanish government through international and regional organizations, and cooperation executed by Spaniards or third-country nationals linked to Spain by the institution in which they are basically connected Religious

In 2013, Spain canceled the Ivory Coast debt for an amount of 172.75 million euros and 4.63 million dollars, as a result of the country having reached the culmination point in the framework of the Highly Indebted Poor Countries initiative. In 2014 Spain designed a conversion plan for the remaining debt (about 100 million euros in total).

== See also ==
- Foreign relations of Ivory Coast
- Foreign relations of Spain
