= Ivory Coast–United Kingdom relations =

- Ivory Coast: United Kingdom

Diplomatic mission
- Embassy of Ivory Coast, London: Embassy of the United Kingdom, Abidjan

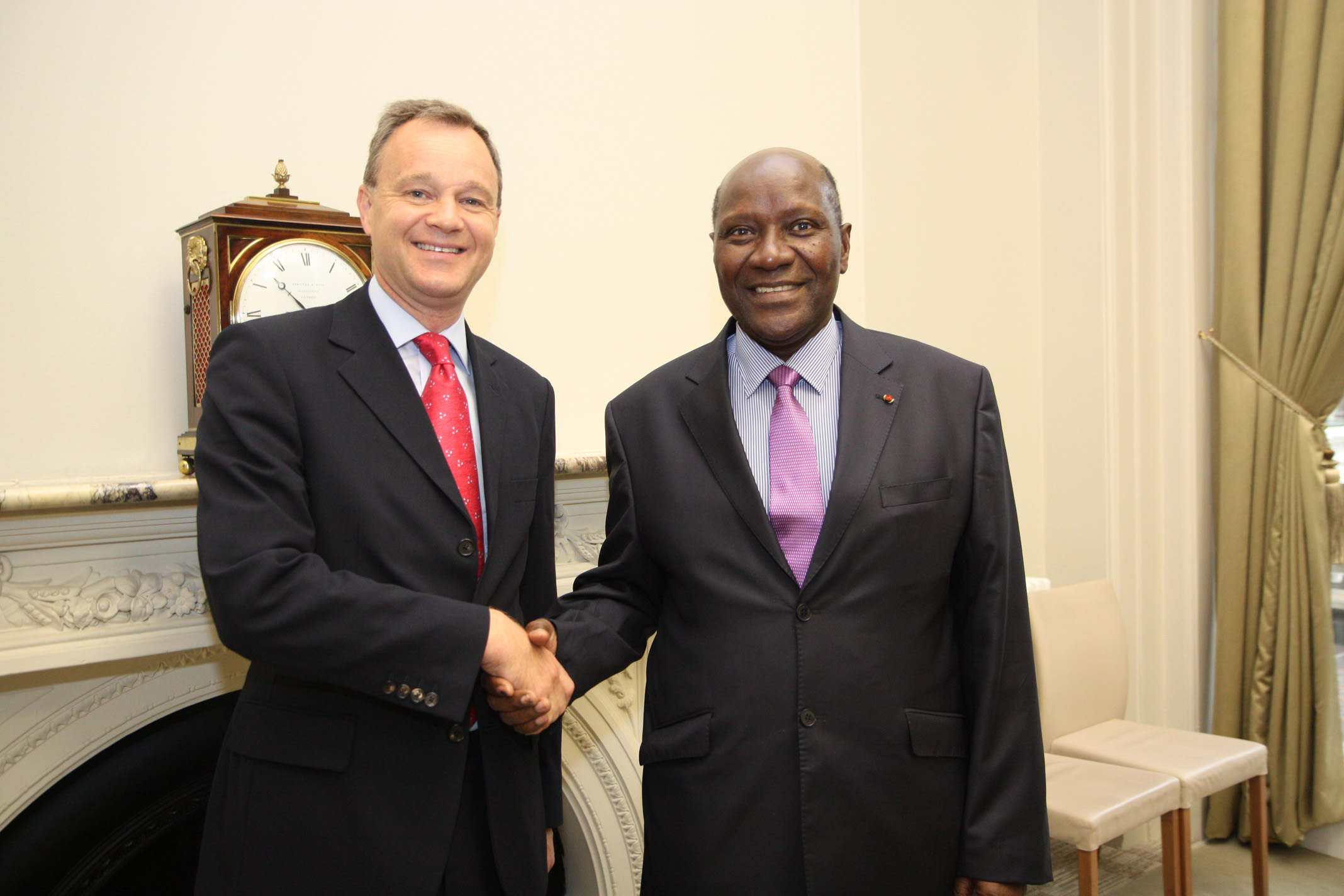
British Foreign Office Minister Mark Simmonds with Ivorian Prime Minister Daniel Kablan Duncan in London, June 2013.

The Ivory Coast–United Kingdom relations are the foreign and bilateral relations between the Republic of Côte d'Ivoire and the United Kingdom of Great Britain and Northern Ireland. The two countries established diplomatic relations on 12 October 1960.

Both countries share common membership of the Atlantic Co-operation Pact, the International Criminal Court, and the World Trade Organization. Bilaterally the two countries have an Economic Partnership Agreement, a High Level Prosperity Partnership, and an Investment Agreement.

== Economic relations ==
Ivory Coast–UK Stepping Stone Economic Partnership Agreement
Stepping Stone Economic Partnership Agreement between the United Kingdom of Great Britain and Northern Ireland, of the one part, and Côte d’Ivoire, of the other part
- Type: Free trade agreement
- Context: Trade continuity agreement between Ivory Coast and the United Kingdom
- Signed: 15 October 2020
- Location: London, England, United Kingdom
- Effective: 1 January 2021
- Parties: Ivory Coast; United Kingdom
- Language: English; French

The Stepping Stone Economic Partnership Agreement between the United Kingdom and Ivory Coast was signed on 15 October 2020 in London. This agreement was created to maintain and strengthen trade relations between the UK and Ivory Coast after the UK's departure from the European Union. Both the UK and Ivory Coast were directly represented in the signing of this treaty. The agreement is bilingual, with both English and French versions being equally valid and authoritative. The treaty allows for tariff-free trade and supports cooperation on goods and standards, thus preserving and facilitating essential economic links between the two parties. Both languages are used in administering the agreement, ensuring clear communication and effective implementation. The accord provides stability and continuity for trade, benefiting the economies of the UK and Ivory Coast.

From 3 September 2016 until 30 December 2020, trade between Ivory Coast and the UK was governed by the European Community–Ivory Coast Stepping Stone Economic Partnership Agreement, while the United Kingdom was a member of the European Union.

Following the withdrawal of the United Kingdom from the European Union, the UK and the Ivory Coast signed the Ivory Coast–UK Stepping Stone Economic Partnership Agreement on 15 October 2020. The Ivory Coast–UK Stepping Stone Economic Partnership Agreement is a continuity trade agreement, based on the EU free trade agreement, which entered into force on 1 January 2021. Trade value between Ivory Coast and the United Kingdom was worth £539 million in 2022.

== Diplomatic missions ==
- Ivory Coast maintains an embassy in London.
- The United Kingdom is accredited to Ivory Coast through its embassy in Abidjan.

== See also ==
- Foreign relations of Ivory Coast
- Foreign relations of the United Kingdom
- Free trade agreements of the United Kingdom
