= Ivory Coast–Russia relations =

- Ivory Coast: Russia

Ivory Coast–Russia relations (Russian: Российско-ивуарские отношения) are the bilateral relations between Ivory Coast and Russia. Russia works on UN missions to help the people of Ivory Coast. The help is sometimes provided from the Russian embassy in Abidjan, but is also done from the embassy in Accra, Ghana. From these point of view, Russia regarded the outcome of the extraordinary summit held in Dakar, Senegal, of the Economic Community for West African States.

== History ==
After the breakup of the Soviet Union, the relations between the two countries became strong and friendly. Ever since Russia has sent UN missions to the country, the relations got even stronger. There was however a feud in the relations when un-cut diamonds were brought to Russia by Ivory Coast. This calls for a decree that Ivory Coast has just committed human rights violations and financial sanctions against individuals. The decree is a symbolic move for Russia, which is known for its highly secretive diamond trade, making it a popular destination for "conflict diamonds" from war-torn countries such as the Ivory Coast and Liberia. Russia has played its part in the fight against conflict diamonds by chairing the Kimberly Process until Botswana took over the chairmanship in January 2006, and is currently the chair of the Kimberley Process Participation Committee.

== See also ==
- Foreign relations of Ivory Coast
- Foreign relations of Russia
- Ivory Coast–Soviet Union relations
