= Taipei Representative Office, Abidjan =

Political representative office in Abdjan, Ivory Coast

Taipei Representative Office in Ivory Coast
- Bureau de Représentation de Taipei en Côte d'Ivoire 駐象牙海岸臺北代表處

Agency overview
- Formed: 2022
- Jurisdiction: Ivory Coast
- Headquarters: 1, Boulevard de l'indénié, Le Plateau, Abidjan, Ivory Coast
- Agency executive: Shin Chi-chih, Representative
- Website: Official website

The Taipei Representative Office in Ivory Coast (Chinese: 駐象牙海岸臺北代表處; French: Bureau de Représentation de Taipei en Côte d'Ivoire) represents the interests of Taiwan in Ivory Coast in the absence of formal diplomatic relations, functioning as a de facto embassy.

== History ==
The aim of the representative office is to further bilateral cooperation between Ivory Coast and Taiwan in the fields of economics, culture, education and research.

From 1963 to 1983, Taiwan had full formal relations with Ivory Coast. In 1983, diplomatic relations were severed after Ivory Coast switched relations to China. In 1992, under then Prime Minister of Ivory Coast Alassane Ouattara, Minister of Foreign Affairs of Ivory Coast Amara Essy signed an agreement with Taiwan to establish an economic office in Abidjan. On 1 January 2017, the office was closed by the International Trade Administration of the Ministry of Economic Affairs of Taiwan due to business considerations. Following the closure of the office, consular services for Ivory Coast was held by the Taipei Trade Office in the Federal Republic of Nigeria and Taipei Representative Office in France.

On 12 November 2022, the Ministry of Foreign Affairs of Taiwan announced that in order to continue to assist Taiwanese businessmen to expand into the African market and seize business opportunities, an agreement was reached with the Government of Ivory Coast to establish the Taipei Representative Office in Abdjan. The representative office currently does not handle consular affairs and its consular affairs are still handled by offices in Nigeria and France. Following the opening of the office, the Chinese Embassy in Abidjan said it opposed Taiwan setting up any kind of representative office in Ivory Coast. The embassy also said it was against any moves that support Taiwan independence or harm relations between China and Ivory Coast.

According to a report by Taipei Times, the trade volume between Ivory Coast and Taiwan grew to 9.1 percent in the first six months of 2023 following the opening of the office.

== Heads ==
Heads of the Representative Office in Ivory Coast:

1. Shin Chi-chih, since January 2023

== See also ==
- List of diplomatic missions of Taiwan
- List of diplomatic missions in Ivory Coast
