= Ivory Coast–Turkey relations =

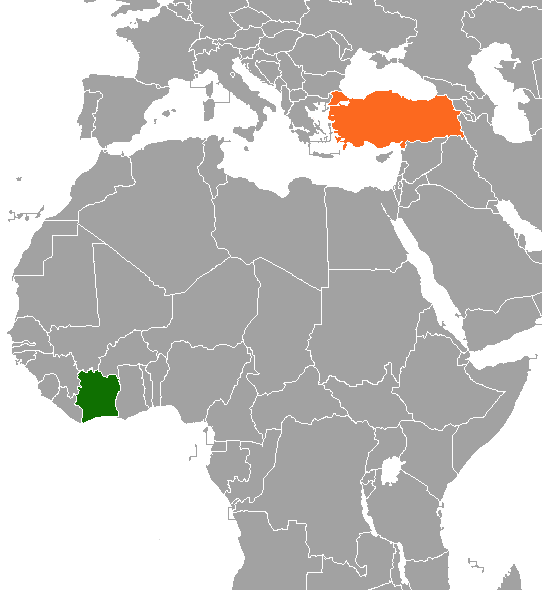
- Ivory Coast: Turkey

Ivory Coast–Turkey relations are the foreign relations between Ivory Coast and Turkey.

== Historical relations ==
For most of the 20th century, President Houphouët-Boigny’s and Turkey's foreign policy aligned: Both countries have been staunch supporters of Israel and considered the Soviet Union as a threat.

Bilateral relations became tense in the early 1960s when President Houphouët-Boigny assisted French nuclear testing in Algeria and refused to (1) condemn France for its response to Algerian War and (2) provide Algeria with any assistance.

Relations became tense again in February 1986, when Houphouët-Boigny announced the decision to move his country's embassy from Tel Aviv to Jerusalem in exchange for Israeli aid. This decision was in defiance of a 1980 United Nations Security Council resolution calling on all countries to withdraw their embassies from that city.

== Presidential visits ==
Guest	Host	Place of visit	Date of visit
(Ivory Coast) President Alassane Ouattara	(Turkey) President Abdullah Gül	Çankaya Köşkü, Ankara	March 25-28, 2014
(Turkey) President Recep Tayyip Erdoğan	(Ivory Coast) President Alassane Ouattara	Abidjan	February 28-29, 2016

== Economic relations ==
- Trade volume between the two countries was US$409.7 million in 2019 (Turkish exports/imports: US$220.9/188.8 million).
- There are direct flights from Istanbul to Abidjan since July 2012.

== See also ==
- Foreign relations of Ivory Coast
- Foreign relations of Turkey
