= Germany–Ivory Coast relations =

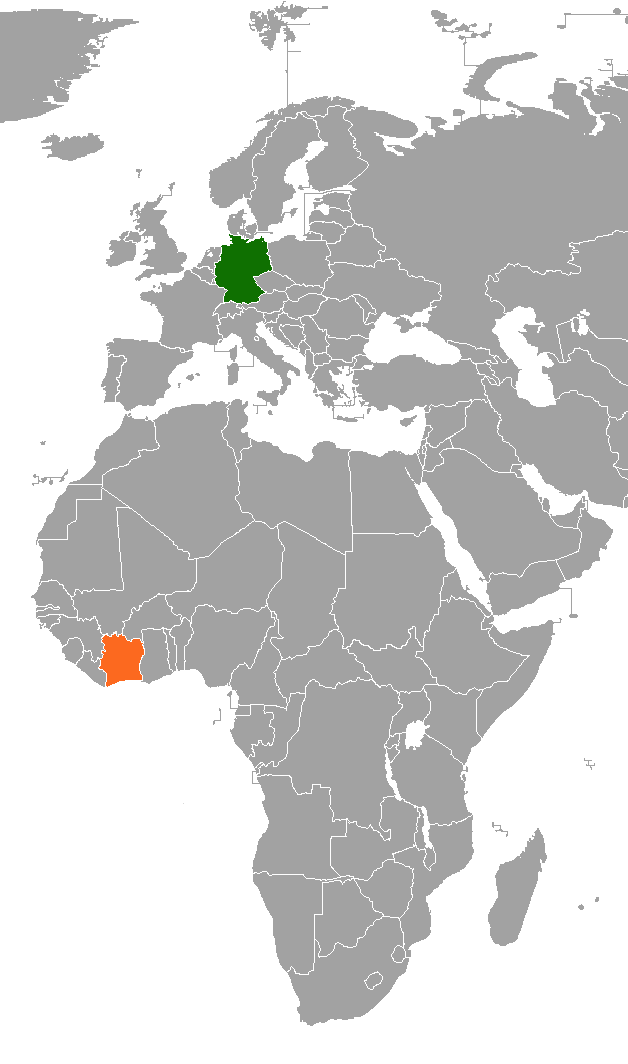

- Germany: Ivory Coast

Germany–Ivory Coast relations are described by the German Foreign Office as "traditionally friendly".

== History ==
Immediately after the Ivory Coast's independence from France in 1960, the Federal Republic of Germany (FRG) established diplomatic relations with it. Thus, a branch of the German Consulate in Dakar, established in Abidjan on December 14, 1959, was transformed into an embassy. From 1984 until German reunification, the Ivory Coast also maintained diplomatic relations with the German Democratic Republic (GDR).

In 1999, the two countries began cooperating on environmental protection. Ivorian President Alassane Ouattara visited Berlin in January 2013 and met with German Chancellor Angela Merkel. The meeting focused on strengthening cooperation in the field of energy supply. In November 2017, German Chancellor Angela Merkel visited Abidjan to attend the EU-Africa Summit.

== Economic relations ==
The bilateral trade volume between the two countries was €1.1 billion in 2021, making Ivory Coast one of Germany's most important trading partners in all of Africa. Ivory Coast is an important supplier for the German cocoa processing industry and exports to Germany primarily raw cocoa. In 2019, nearly 60 percent of Germany's raw cocoa imports came from the Ivory Coast.

KfW and the German Investment and Development Company (DEG) have been present in the Ivory Coast since 2017 and 2018, respectively.

== Development cooperation ==
Since 2011, development cooperation has been deepened and intensified. Since the 1990s, the two countries have been working together on environmental protection. There are also joint cooperation projects in the areas of health/family planning and HIV/AIDS prevention, private sector development, and natural resource governance.

== Culture and education ==
The German language is very important in the Ivory Coast and almost 300,000 people learn German as a foreign language. The universities of Abidjan and Bouaké have their own German language institutes, each with over 1,000 students. There is also a Goethe Institute and the German Academic Exchange Service is active in the country. Thanks to German development aid to the country and support for reconstruction after the civil war in Côte d'Ivoire, Germany enjoys a good reputation in the country.

== Diplomatic missions ==
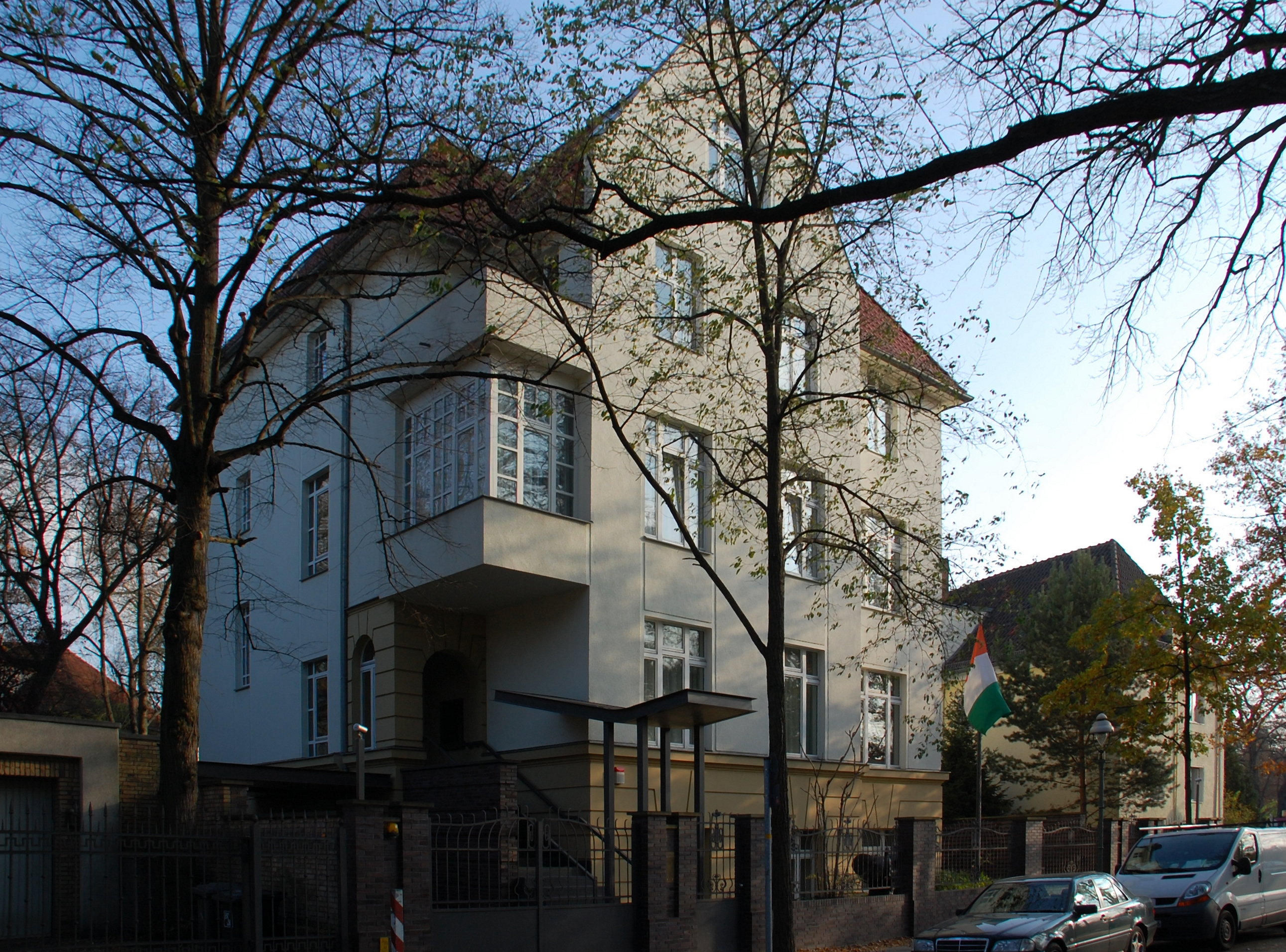
Ivorian embassy in Germany

- Germany has an embassy in Abidjan.
- Ivory Coast has an embassy in Berlin.
