= China–Ivory Coast relations =

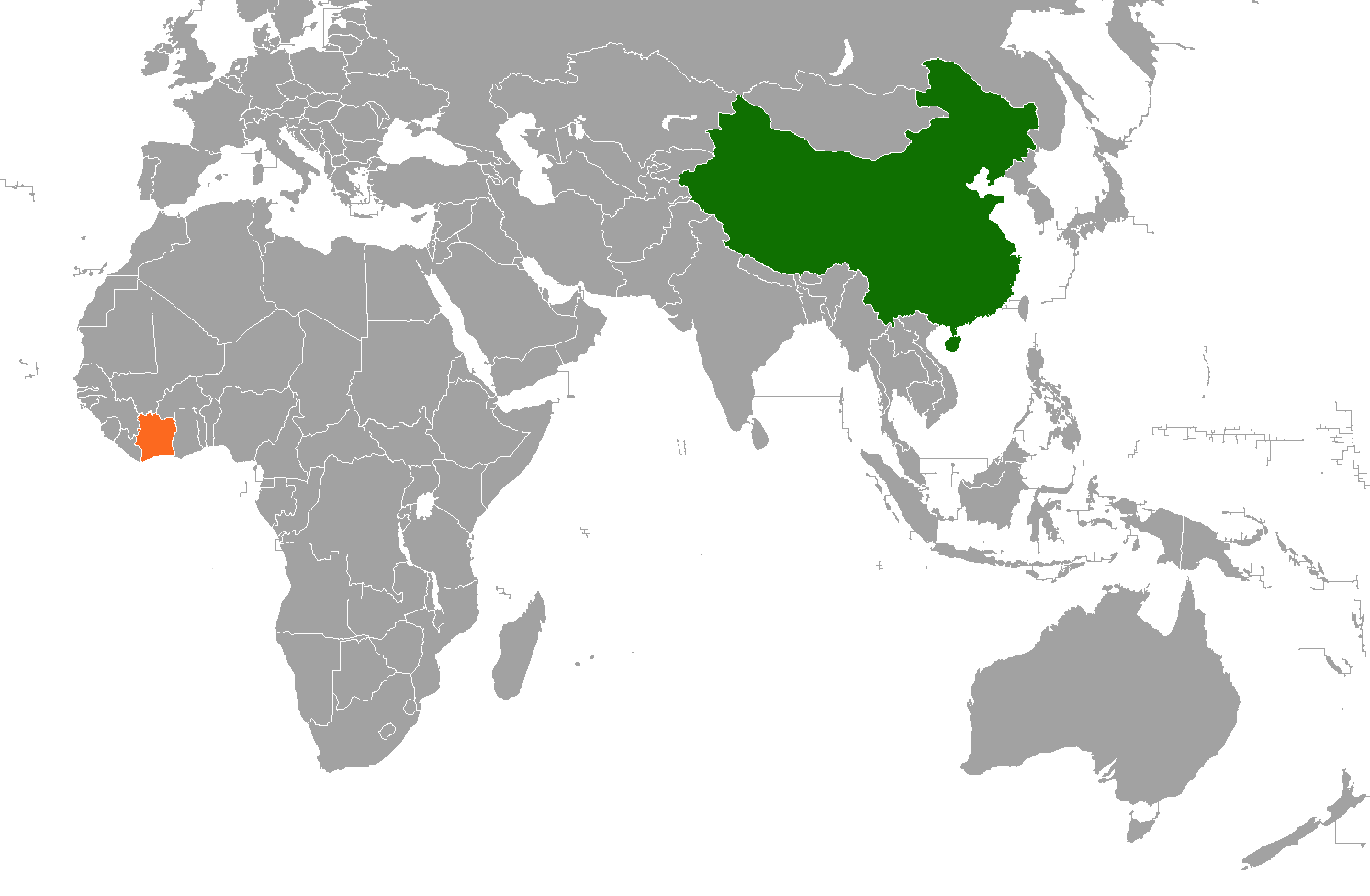
- China: Ivory Coast

China–Ivory Coast relations refer to the foreign relations between China and Ivory Coast. They established the diplomatic relations on March 2, 1983.

== Economic relations ==
From 2000 to 2011, there are approximately 34 Chinese official development finance projects identified in Côte d'Ivoire through various media reports. These projects range from a $114 million loan from Export-Import Bank of China at two-percent interest over 20 years to finance a motorway construction project linking Abidjan to Grand-Bassam, to an 18 million EUR debt relief in 2007.

According to Xavier Aurégan, PhD at the French Institute of Geopolitics, from 1983 to 2013, there are approximately 174 Chinese official development finance projects in Côte d'Ivoire. Of these 174 official development finance projects, 112 are approximately €12 billion. The most expensive project is the urban center in Abidjan (€8.9 billion). In addition, infrastructure accounted for 86% of the Chinese public assistance. The majority of Chinese aid is granted during the Ivorian political crisis between 2002 and 2010. Under Laurent Gbagbo, 69% of aid is thus assigned.

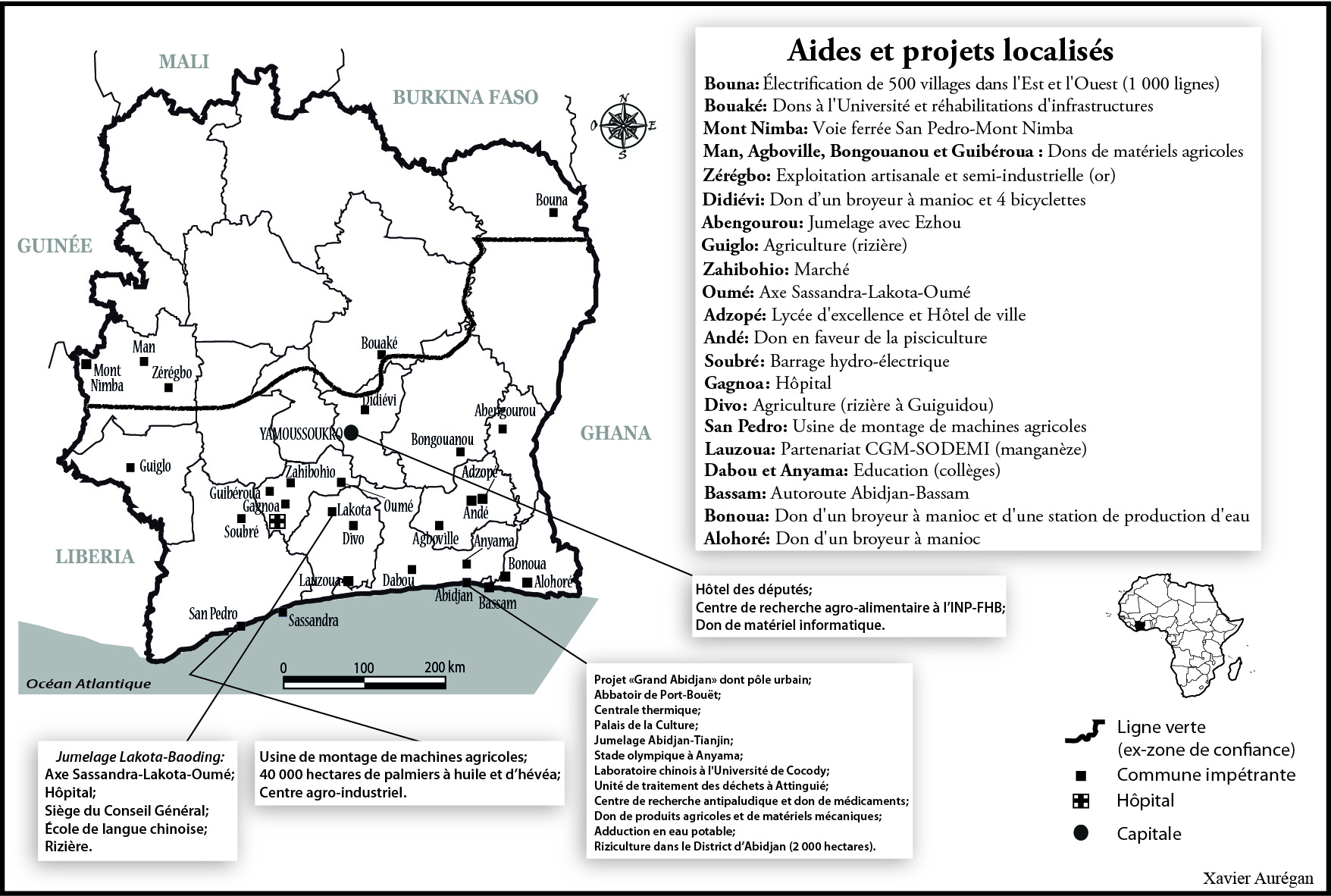
Chinese projects in Ivory Coast from 1983 to 2013

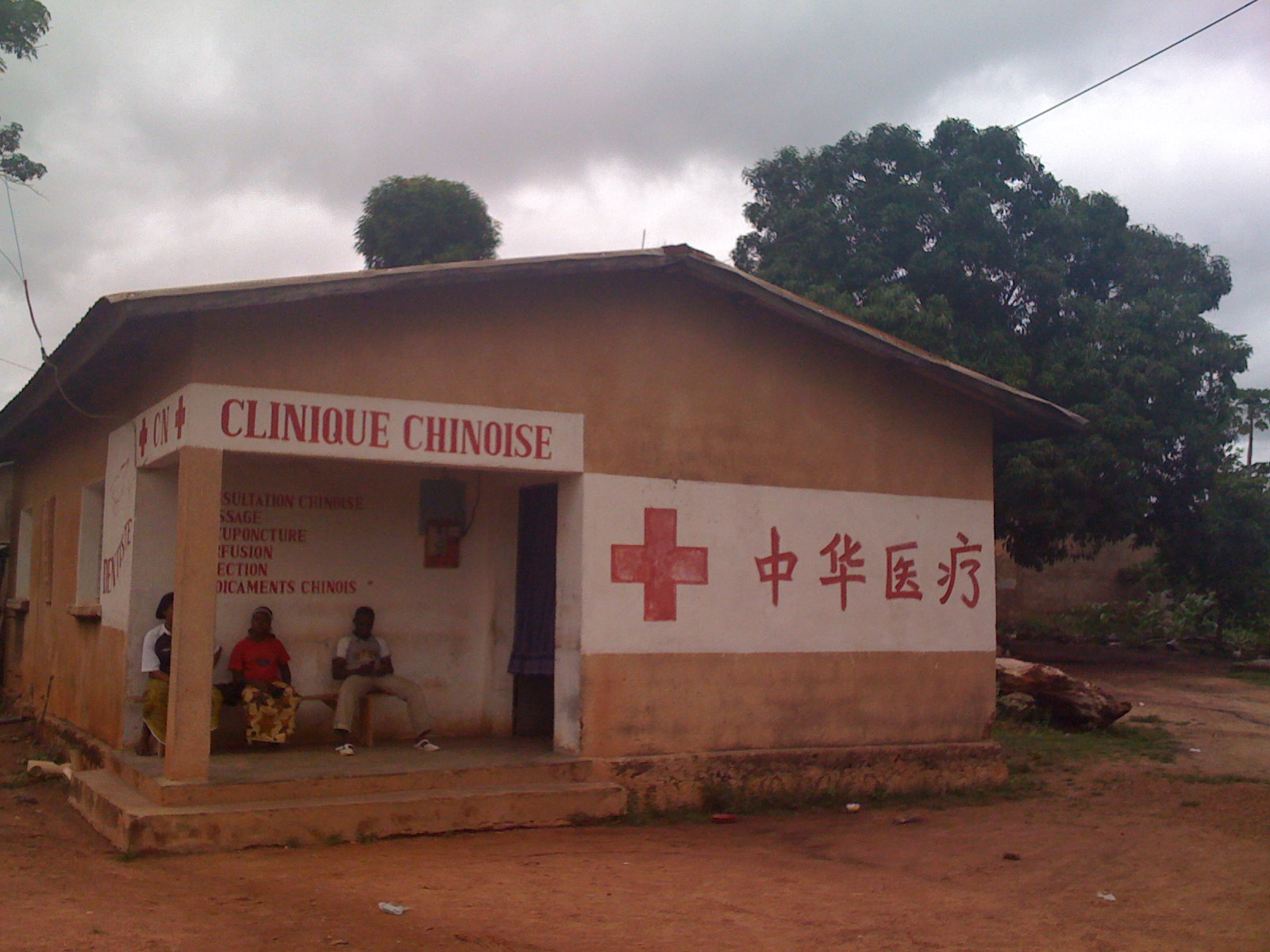
A Chinese Clinic offering traditional Chinese medicine in Ferkessédougou

Ivory Coast joined the Belt and Road Initiative (BRI) in 2017.

== Sovereignty issues ==
Ivory Coast follows the one China principle. It recognizes the People's Republic of China as the sole government of China and Taiwan as an integral part of China's territory, and supports all efforts by the PRC to "achieve national reunification". It also considers Hong Kong, Xinjiang and Tibet to be China's internal affairs.
