= Ivory Coast–United States relations =

- United States: Ivory Coast

Ivory Coast is one of the most pro-United States nations in Africa and the world, with 85% viewing the U.S. favorably in 2002, and rising to a high of 88% in 2007.

== History ==
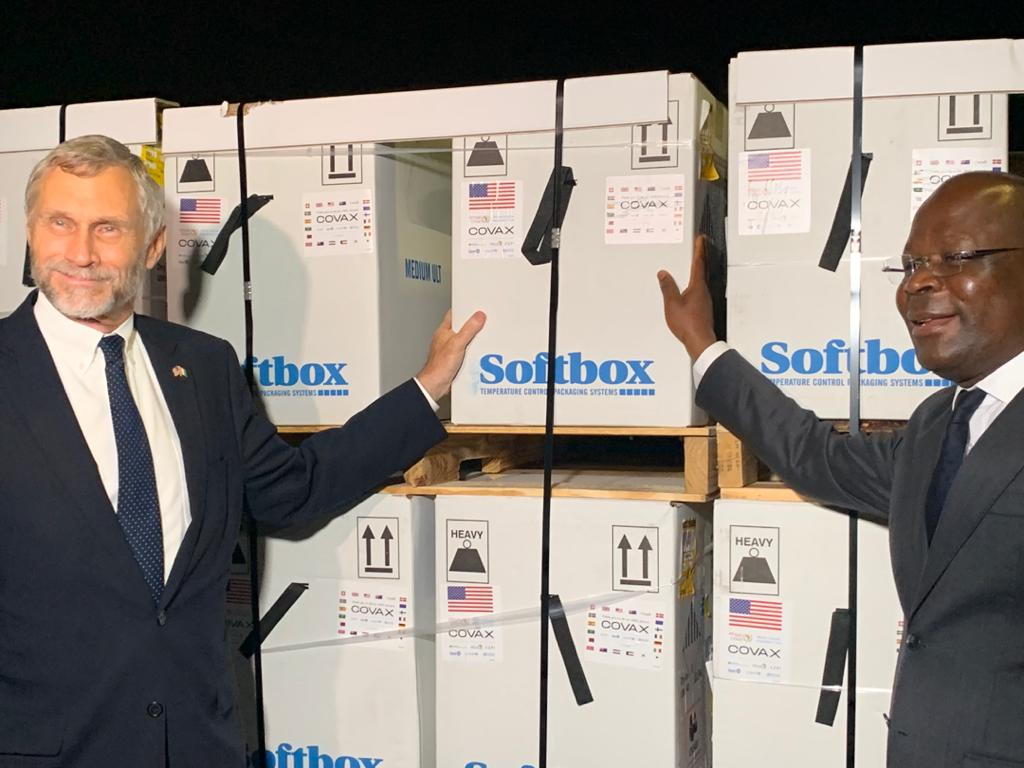
The US delivers Pfizer–BioNTech COVID-19 vaccines to Côte d'Ivoire as part of the COVAX initiative in 2021

In 1842, the U.S. Navy launched the Ivory Coast expedition, a punitive expedition carried out in response to attacks on U.S. merchant ships by the native Bereby people, residing in what would become the modern-day country of Ivory Coast.

As of the late 1980s, Ivory Coast's relationship with the U.S. was cordial, if less intimate than its ties with its former colonizer France. Through the mid-1980s, Ivory Coast was one of Africa's most loyal supporter of the United States in the United Nations General Assembly. It supported the larger United States agenda on Chad, the Western Sahara, southern Africa, and Israel. The government strongly approved of moves by the United States against Muammar al-Gaddafi, especially in light of rumors that Libyans in Burkina Faso were recruiting and training agents to infiltrate Ivory Coast. United States Secretary of State George P. Shultz visited Abidjan in 1986 following Félix Houphouët-Boigny's visit to Washington, D.C. in 1983.

The United States continued to be Ivory Coast's leading trading partner, after France. During the Cold War, foreign policymakers in Washington continued to point to Ivory Coast as an exemplar of successful capitalism, even as Ivory Coast's foreign debt mounted out of control. While enjoying a favorable image in the United States, Houphouët-Boigny has indirectly criticized the United States by attacking the system of international trade, which the United States supported unequivocally, but which Houphouët-Boigny claimed was responsible for his country's economic ills.

Some strain has resulted from the Section 508 restrictions on nonhumanitarian aid imposed on Ivory Coast following the December 1999 coup. Because of Ivorian governmental interference in the 2000 presidential elections, the Section 508 restrictions were not lifted. The U.S. participates in the international effort to assist Ivory Coast in overcoming its current crisis, providing more than a quarter of the funding for the UN peacekeeping mission that helps to maintain the ceasefire. The U.S. has also provided modest economic support fund (ESF) assistance to promote democracy. The U.S. is sympathetic to Ivory Coast's desire for rapid, orderly economic development as well as its moderate stance on international issues. Bilateral U.S. Agency for International Development funding, with the exception of self-help and democracy and human rights funds, has been phased out, although Ivory Coast continues to benefit to a limited extent from regional West African programs. The country remains a major beneficiary of U.S. assistance in combating HIV/AIDS, as it is one of 15 focus countries under the President's Emergency Plan for AIDS Relief (PEPFAR). With assistance under PEPFAR likely to total some $85 million in FY 2007 (equivalent to $123,520,000 in 2024), this is by far the largest U.S. assistance program in Ivory Coast. Ivorian eligibility for the African Growth and Opportunity Act (AGOA) has been withdrawn, following the political impasse resulting from the 2002 rebellion. The U.S. and Ivory Coast maintain an active cultural exchange program, through which prominent Ivorian Government officials, media representatives, educators, and scholars visit the U.S. to become better acquainted with the American people and to exchange ideas and views with their American colleagues. This cooperative effort is furthered through frequent visits to Ivory Coast by representatives of U.S. business and educational institutions, and by visits of Fulbright-Hays scholars and specialists in various fields. A new U.S. Embassy chancery compound opened in July 2005. A modest security assistance program that provides professional training for Ivorian military officers in the U.S. has been suspended by the Section 508 restrictions.

== USAID Closure ==
Since President Donald Trump's Administration cut back on USAID to Africa, the closure of 516 health facilities in the Ivory Coast has severely impacted HIV/AIDS treatment, affecting 85% of those receiving care according to the United Nations. The shutdowns, which disrupted support for over 400,000 adults and children living with HIV, have also displaced more than 8,600 healthcare workers, including doctors, nurses, and midwives.

In 2025, the U.S. halted a $20 million USAID program in northern Ivory Coast, which had been crucial in countering extremist influence through job training, agricultural projects, and border security. Initially launched under the 2019 Global Fragility Act, the initiative aimed to prevent jihadist recruitment by addressing poverty and instability. Its termination, part of broader U.S. foreign aid cuts, has raised concerns about increased vulnerability to extremist groups, particularly as violence escalates in neighboring Mali and the Sahel region.

== Location of the United States Embassy ==
While Yamoussoukro is the political capital of Ivory Coast, the U.S. Embassy is located in the economic capital of the country, in the Riveria Golf neighborhood of Cocody, Abidjan.

== US Government Terminology ==
The United States Department of State uses the name Republic of Côte d'Ivoire when referring to Ivory Coast in international settings and diplomatic matters. They also use the francophone demonym "Ivoirian" in official communications.

== Embassy of Ivory Coast in Washington, D.C. ==
Embassy of Ivory Coast, Washington, D.C.
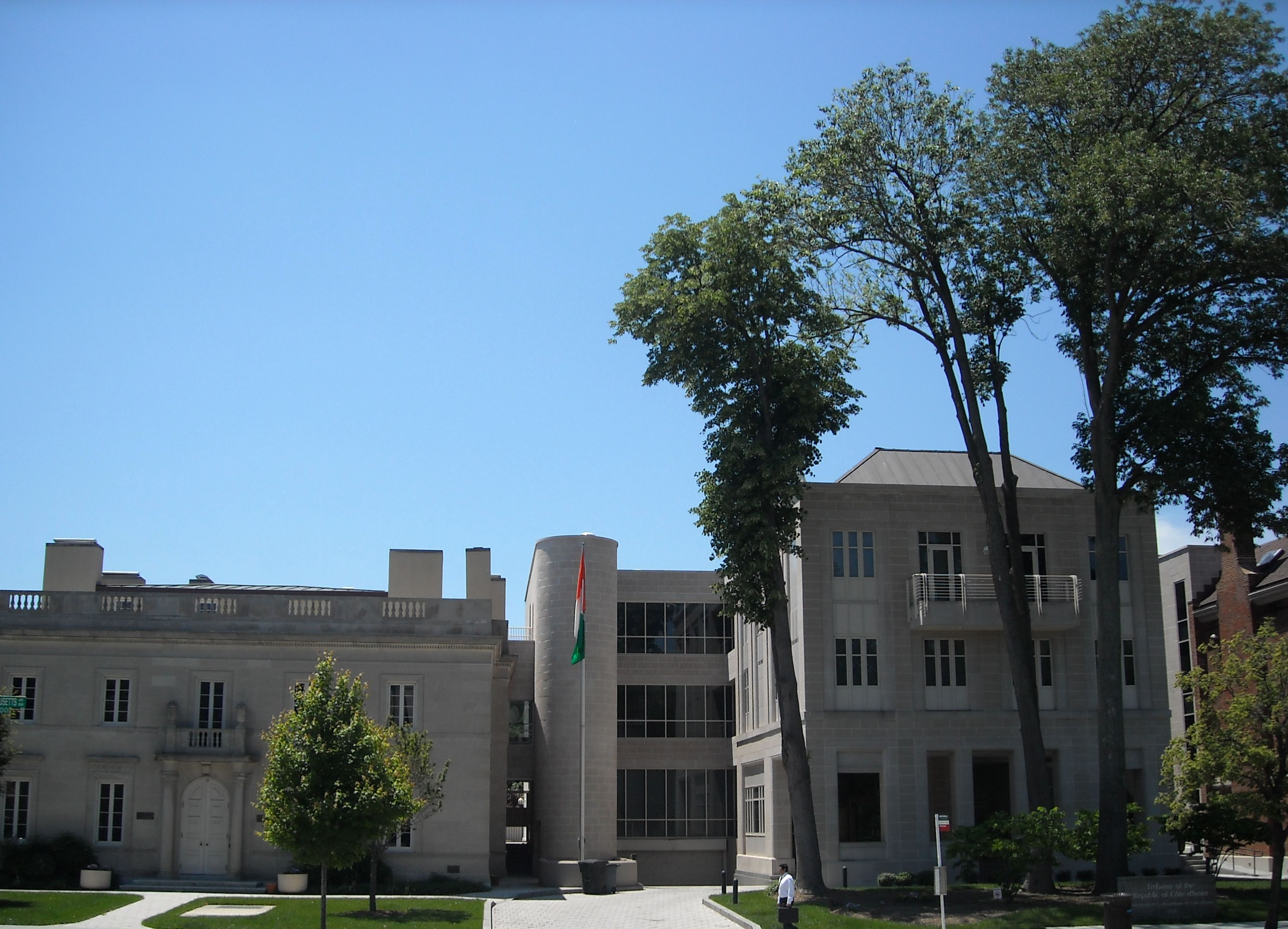
- Location: Washington, D.C.
- Address: 2424 Massachusetts Avenue, N.W.
- Coordinates: 38°54′49″N 77°3′12″W
- Ambassador: Yao Charles Koffi

The Embassy of Ivory Coast in Washington, D.C. is the diplomatic mission of the Republic of Ivory Coast to the United States. It is located in the Embassy Row neighborhood.

The Ambassador is Yao Charles Koffi.
