= Politics of Ivory Coast =

The politics of Ivory Coast takes place in a framework of a presidential representative democratic republic, whereby the President of Ivory Coast is both head of state and head of government, and of a multi-party system. Executive power is exercised by the President and the Government. Legislative power is vested in both the government and parliament.

The capital since 1983 is Yamoussoukro; however, Abidjan remains the commercial center. Most countries maintain their embassies in Abidjan. A civil war was fought in Ivory Coast between 2002–2004 and a second civil war broke out in March 2011 following contested elections that saw president-elect Alassane Ouattara come into power in 2011 and reelected in 2015.

== Civil war ==
Troops, mostly hailing from the north of the country, mutinied in the early hours of 19 September 2002. They soon after launched attacks in many cities, including Abidjan. By lunchtime, they had control of the north of the country. Their principal claim relates to the definition of who is a citizen of Ivory Coast (and so who can stand for election as president), voting rights and their representation in government in Abidjan. The events in Abidjan shows that it is not a tribal issue, but a crisis of transition from a dictatorship to a democracy, with the clashes inherent in the definition of citizenship. Forces involved in the conflict include:

- Government forces, the National Army (FANCI), also called loyalists, formed and equipped essentially since 2003
- The Young Patriots: nationalist groups aligned with President Laurent Gbagbo
- Mercenaries recruited by President Gbagbo:
  - allegedly, Belarusians
  - some former combatants of Liberia, including under-17 youths, forming the so-called "Lima militia"
- New Forces (Forces Nouvelles, FN), ex-northern rebels, who hold 60% of the country; their political expression is the Mouvement patriotique de Côte d'Ivoire, or MPCI
- French forces: troops sent within the framework of Opération Licorne and under UN mandate (United Nations Operation in Côte d'Ivoire), 3000 men in February 2003 and 4600 in November 2004;
- Soldiers of the Economic Community of West African States (ECOWAS), White helmets, also under the UN.

== Executive branch ==
Current officeholders
President	Alassane Ouattara	Rally of the Republicans	4 December 2011
Vice-President	Tiémoko Meyliet Koné	Independent	19 April 2022
Prime Minister	Robert Beugré Mambé	Rally of the Republicans	17 October 2023

Ivory Coast's 1959 constitution provides for strong presidency within the framework of a separation of powers. The executive is personified in the president, elected for a five-year term. The president is commander in chief of the armed forces, may negotiate and ratify certain treaties, and may submit a bill to a national referendum or to the National Assembly. According to the constitution, the President of the National Assembly assumes the presidency in the event of a vacancy, and he completes the remainder of the deceased president's term. The cabinet is selected by and is responsible to the president. Changes are being proposed to some of these provisions, to extend term of office to 7 years, establish a senate, and make president of the senate interim successor to the president.

Laurent Gbagbo took power following a popular overthrow of the interim leader Gen. Robert Guéï who had claimed a dubious victory in presidential elections; Gen. Guéï himself had assumed power on 25 December 1999, following a military coup against the government of former President Henri Konan Bédié. Gbagbo was elected president in 2000 in an election boycotted by many oppositional forces. The president is elected by popular vote for a five-year term. The prime minister is appointed by the president. Alassane Ouattara is currently the president of Ivory Coast. He was reelected in the 2015 Ivorian presidential election.

After a new constitution was approved by referendum, it is expected President Alassane Ouattara would appoint a Vice-President before 2020. The President and Vice-President will run on a joint ticket from 2020. They will be both elected for a five-year term, with only one possible reelection. The Vice-President will replace the President in case of death, resignation and any other vacancy.

In November 2020, Alassane Ouattara won third term in office in elections boycotted by the opposition. His opponents argued it was illegal for president Ouattara to run for a third term.

== Legislative branch ==
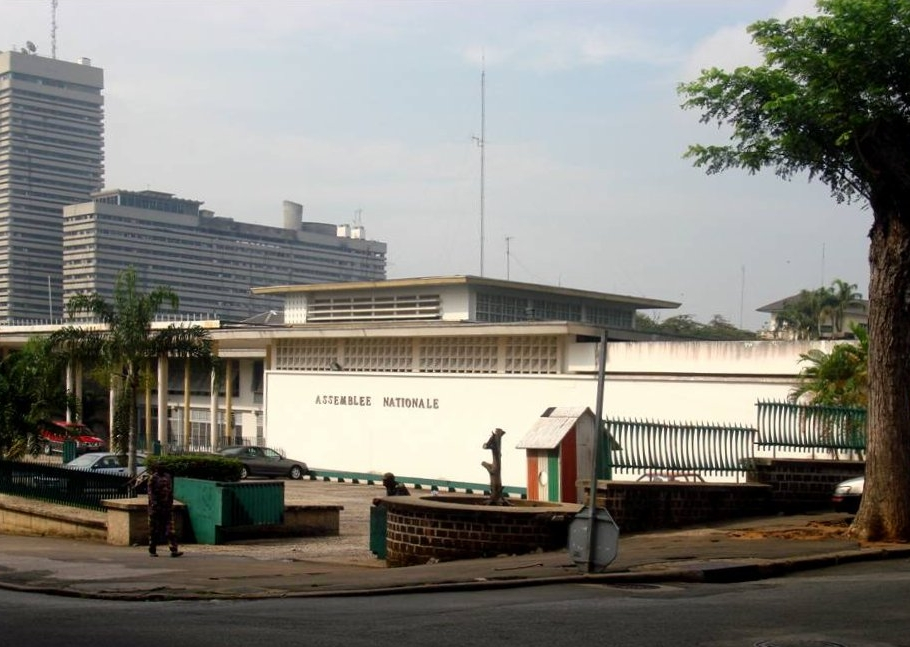
National Assembly of Ivory Coast.

Parliament of Ivory Coast is a bicameral body composed by the National Assembly and the Senate of Ivory Coast. Prior to November 2016 and the future creation of the Senate, the Parliament of Ivory Coast was only composed of the National Assembly. The National Assembly (Assemblée Nationale) has 255 members, elected for a five-year term in single-seat constituencies. It passes on legislation typically introduced by the president although it also can introduce legislation. The Senate of Ivory Coast (Sénat) will have two-thirds of the senators indirectly elected and one-third appointed by the president-elect, elected for a five-year term in single-seat constituencies. Ivory Coast is a one party dominant state with the Rally of the Republicans in power.

== Judicial branch ==
The judicial system culminates in the Supreme Court of Ivory Coast. The High Court of Justice is competent to try government officials for major offenses. The Supreme Court or Court Supreme consists of four chambers: Judicial Chamber for criminal cases, Audit Chamber for financial cases, Constitutional Chamber for judicial review cases, and Administrative Chamber for civil cases; there is no legal limit to the number of members.

== Political parties and elections ==
=== Presidential elections ===
Candidate	Party	Votes	%
Alassane Ouattara	Rally of Houphouëtists for Democracy and Peace	3,031,483	95.31
Kouadio Konan Bertin	Independent	64,011	2.01
Henri Konan Bédié	Democratic Party of Ivory Coast	53,330	1.68
Pascal Affi N'Guessan	Ivorian Popular Front	31,986	1.01
Total		3,180,810	100.00
Valid votes		3,180,810	97.28
Invalid votes		53,904	1.65
Blank votes		35,099	1.07
Total votes		3,269,813	100.00
Registered voters/turnout		6,066,441	53.90
Source: Independent Electoral Commission

=== Parliamentary elections ===
Party	Votes	%	Seats
Rally of Houphouëtists for Democracy and Peace	1,318,715	48.64	139
Democratic Party of Ivory Coast/Together for Democracy and Sovereignty	441,691	16.29	50
Democratic Party of Ivory Coast	161,601	5.96	23
Together for Democracy and Sovereignty	119,360	4.40	8
Ivorian Popular Front	52,343	1.93	2
UDPCI/Arc-en-ciel	40,949	1.51	7
Ivorian Popular Front/AFD/UDPCI/Arc-en-ciel	12,877	0.48	1
For the Republic and Democracy	2,417	0.09	0
Republican Union for Democracy	2,053	0.08	0
Rally of Democrats of Ivory Coast	1,810	0.07	0
Rally for Peace and Agreement	1,694	0.06	0
1,000 Volunteers	1,600	0.06	0
Union of Democrats for Progress	1,146	0.04	0
Party for African Integration	1,016	0.04	0
Rally for Peace and Agreement/Group of Political Partners for Peace	911	0.03	0
Ecological Party of Ivory Coast	822	0.03	0
Strength to the Peoples	681	0.03	0
Alliance for Democracy Movement	589	0.02	0
Serving Ivory Coast	587	0.02	0
National Civic Movement	533	0.02	0
New Union for Ivory Coast	464	0.02	0
People's Party of Social Democrats	405	0.01	0
Democratic and Civic Union	402	0.01	0
Party for Progress and Socialism	392	0.01	0
Ivorian Ecological Party	300	0.01	0
National, Democratic and Reformist Front	263	0.01	0
Congress for an Ivorian and Pan-African Renaissance	248	0.01	0
Reform is Possible	246	0.01	0
Pan-African Congress for Renewal	244	0.01	0
People's Socialist Union	237	0.01	0
Union for Total Democracy in Ivory Coast	233	0.01	0
Union for National Progress	228	0.01	0
Group of Political Partners for Peace	194	0.01	0
Liberal Democratic Party	192	0.01	0
Ivorian Democratic Front	181	0.01	0
Pan-African Democratic Rally	175	0.01	0
Ivorian Centrist Alliance	143	0.01	0
Business and Farmers Party of Ivory Coast	118	0.00	0
National Integrity and Conscience	82	0.00	0
Democratic and Social Movement	79	0.00	0
Social Democrat Party	66	0.00	0
Ivorian Party of Challenges to Overcome	64	0.00	0
National Congress for the Development of Ivory Coast	57	0.00	0
Collective of Democratic Ivorians	55	0.00	0
National Reforming Party	53	0.00	0
Party of Democratic Rebirth and Development	46	0.00	0
Party of Republican Democrats	43	0.00	0
National Movement of Young Centrists	18	0.00	0
UNITE-AMOUR-PAIX	10	0.00	0
Independents	508,095	18.74	25
Blank votes	34,198	1.26	–
Total	2,710,926	100.00	255
Valid votes	2,710,926	97.03	
Invalid votes	83,021	2.97	
Total votes	2,793,947	100.00	
Registered voters/turnout	7,379,640	37.86	
Source: CEI

== Administrative divisions ==
For administrative purposes, Ivory Coast is divided into 58 departments, each headed by a prefect appointed by the central government. There are 196 communes, each headed by an elected mayor, plus the city of Abidjan with ten mayors.

The 58 departments (départements, singular - département) are listed in the article Departments of Ivory Coast.

== International organization participation ==
ACP, AfDB, AU, ECA, ECOWAS, Entente, FAO, FZ, G-24, G-77, IAEA, IBRD, ICAO, ICCt (signatory), ICRM, IDA, IDB, IFAD, IFC, IFRCS, ILO, IMF, IMO, Interpol, IOC, IOM, ISO, ITU, ITUC, MONUC, NAM, OIC, OPCW, UN, UNCTAD, UNESCO, UNHCR, UNIDO, UPU, WADB (regional), WAEMU, WCO, WFTU, WHO, WIPO, WMO, WToO, WTrO

== External links and references ==
- CIA World Factbook 2003
