= 2021–22 SV Waldhof Mannheim season =

SV Waldhof Mannheim
2021–22 season
- Chairman: Bernd Beetz
- Manager: Patrick Glöckner
- Stadium: Carl-Benz-Stadion
- 3. Liga: 5th
- DFB-Pokal: Second round

The 2021–22 season was the 115th in the history of SV Waldhof Mannheim and their third consecutive season in the third division. The club participated in 3. Liga and DFB-Pokal.

== Players ==
As of 31 January 2022

Note: Flags indicate national team as defined under FIFA eligibility rules; some limited exceptions apply. Players may hold more than one non-FIFA nationality.

No.	Pos.	Nation	Player
1	GK	GER	Timo Königsmann
2	DF	GER	Niklas Sommer
3	DF	GER	Léonce Kouadio
4	DF	NED	Jesper Verlaat
5	DF	GER	Marcel Seegert (captain)
6	MF	GER	Stefano Russo
7	MF	GER	Onur Ünlüçifçi
8	MF	GER	Fridolin Wagner
9	FW	GER	Joseph Boyamba
10	FW	GER	Pascal Sohm
11	FW	CRO	Dominik Martinović
13	MF	GER	Marc Schnatterer
14	FW	GER	Anthony Roczen
17	MF	GER	Marcel Costly
18	MF	TUN	Mohamed Gouaida

No.	Pos.	Nation	Player
19	MF	GER	Anton Donkor
20	MF	FRA	Adrien Lebeau
21	DF	GER	Alexander Rossipal
22	DF	GER	Jan Just
23	GK	GER	Jan-Christoph Bartels
24	DF	GER	Marcel Gottschling
25	MF	AZE	Baris Ekincier
27	DF	GER	Gerrit Gohlke
29	FW	GER	Gillian Jurcher
30	GK	GER	Lucien Hawryluk
31	FW	USA	Justin Butler (on loan from Ingolstadt)
34	MF	GER	Dominik Kother (on loan from Karlsruher SC)
35	MF	GER	Hamza Saghiri
37	MF	GER	Marco Höger

== Pre-season and friendlies ==
Win Draw Loss Fixtures

3 July 2021 Friendly	Neckarsulmer SU (Germany)	2–4	(Germany) Waldhof Mannheim	Neckarsulm
14:00 CEST (UTC+2)				Stadium: Sportpark Pichterich

17 July 2021 Friendly	Waldhof Mannheim (Germany)	5–3	(Germany) FC Gießen	Mannheim
14:00 CEST (UTC+2)				Stadium: Sportgelände Alsenweg Platz 3

18 July 2021 Friendly	FSV Frankfurt (Germany)	3–1	(Germany) Waldhof Mannheim	Frankfurt
14:00 CEST (UTC+2)				Stadium: PSD Bank Arena

6 October 2021 Friendly	Waldhof Mannheim (Germany)	2–1	(Germany) Türkspor Mannheim	Mannheim
18:00 CEST (UTC+2)				Stadium: Carl-Benz-Stadion

== Competitions ==
=== Overall record ===
Competition	First match	Last match	Starting round	Final position	Record							
Competition	First match	Last match	Starting round	Final position	Pld	W	D	L	GF	GA	GD	Win %
3. Liga	24 July 2021	14 May 2022	Matchday 1	5th	36	16	12	8	58	40	+18	44.44
DFB-Pokal	8 August 2021		First round	Second round	2	1	0	1	3	3	+0	50.00
Total					38	17	12	9	61	43	+18	44.74

Source: Competitions

=== 3. Liga ===
==== League table ====
Pos	Team	Pld	W	D	L	GF	GA	GD	Pts	Promotion, qualification or relegation
3	1. FC Kaiserslautern (O, P)	36	18	9	9	56	27	+29	63	Qualification for promotion play-offs and DFB-Pokal
4	1860 Munich	36	17	10	9	67	50	+17	61	Qualification for DFB-Pokal
5	Waldhof Mannheim	36	16	12	8	58	40	+18	60	
6	VfL Osnabrück	36	16	10	10	56	48	+8	58	
7	1. FC Saarbrücken	36	14	11	11	50	44	+6	53	

Source: DFB
Rules for classification: 1) Points; 2) Goal difference; 3) Goals scored; 4) Head-to-head results; 5) Head-to-head away goals scored; 6) Away goals scored; 7) Play-off.
(O) Play-off winners; (P) Promoted

==== Results summary ====
Overall								Home						Away					
Pld	W	D	L	GF	GA	GD	Pts	W	D	L	GF	GA	GD	W	D	L	GF	GA	GD
0	0	0	0	0	0	0	0	0	0	0	0	0	0	0	0	0	0	0	0

Source: DFB

==== Results by round ====
Round	1	2	3	4	5	6	7	8	9	10	11	12	13
Ground	H	A	H	A	H	A	H	A	H	A	H	A	H
Result	L	D	D	W	W	L	W	D	W	D	W	W	D
Position													

Source: DFB
A = Away; H = Home; W = Win; D = Draw; L = Loss

==== Matches ====
The league fixtures were announced on 1 July 2021.

24 July 2021 1	Waldhof Mannheim	0–2	1. FC Magdeburg	Mannheim
14:00 CEST (UTC+2)				Stadium: Carl-Benz-Stadion

31 July 2021 2	Borussia Dortmund II	1–1	Waldhof Mannheim	Dortmund
14:00 CEST (UTC+2)				Stadium: Stadion Rote Erde

15 August 2021 3	Waldhof Mannheim	1–1	Würzburger Kickers	Mannheim
14:00 CEST (UTC+2)				Stadium: Carl-Benz-Stadion

21 August 2021 4	Viktoria Köln	2–3	Waldhof Mannheim	Cologne
14:00 CEST (UTC+2)				Stadium: Sportpark Höhenberg

24 August 2021 5	Waldhof Mannheim	5–0	SV Meppen	Mannheim
19:00 CEST (UTC+2)				Stadium: Carl-Benz-Stadion

28 August 2021 6	Viktoria Berlin	1–0	Waldhof Mannheim	Berlin
14:00 CEST (UTC+2)				Stadium: Friedrich-Ludwig-Jahn-Sportpark

4 September 2021 7	Waldhof Mannheim	3–0	Türkgücü München	Mannheim
14:00 CEST (UTC+2)				Stadium: Carl-Benz-Stadion

11 September 2021 8	1. FC Kaiserslautern	0–0	Waldhof Mannheim	Kaiserslautern
14:00 CEST (UTC+2)				Stadium: Fritz-Walter-Stadion

18 September 2021 9	Waldhof Mannheim	2–1	Hallescher FC	Mannheim
14:00 CEST (UTC+2)				Stadium: Carl-Benz-Stadion

25 September 2021 10	Eintracht Braunschweig	0–0	Waldhof Mannheim	Braunschweig
14:00 CEST (UTC+2)				Stadium: Eintracht-Stadion

3 October 2021 11	Waldhof Mannheim	2–1	SC Verl	Mannheim
14:00 CEST (UTC+2)				Stadium: Carl-Benz-Stadion

30 November 2021 12	1860 Munich	1–3	Waldhof Mannheim	Munich
19:00 CEST (UTC+2)				Stadium: Grünwalder Stadion

23 October 2021 13	Waldhof Mannheim	1–1	FSV Zwickau	Mannheim
14:00 CEST (UTC+2)				Stadium: Carl-Benz-Stadion

30 October 2021 14	Waldhof Mannheim	1–0	1. FC Saarbrücken	Mannheim
14:00 CEST (UTC+2)				Stadium: Carl-Benz-Stadion

6 November 2021 15	SC Freiburg II	2–1	Waldhof Mannheim	Freiburg im Breisgau
14:00 CET (UTC+1)				Stadium: Dreisamstadion

21 November 2021 16	Waldhof Mannheim	3–3	VfL Osnabrück	Mannheim
14:00 CET (UTC+1)				Stadium: Carl-Benz-Stadion

26 November 2021 17	MSV Duisburg	1–3	Waldhof Mannheim	Duisburg
19:00 CET (UTC+1)				Stadium: Schauinsland-Reisen-Arena

6 December 2021 18	Waldhof Mannheim	1–1	Wehen Wiesbaden	Mannheim
19:00 CET (UTC+1)				Stadium: Carl-Benz-Stadion

11 December 2021 19	TSV Havelse	1–2	Waldhof Mannheim	Hanover
14:00 CET (UTC+1)				Stadium: HDI-Arena

19 December 2021 20	1. FC Magdeburg	3–0	Waldhof Mannheim	Magdeburg
13:00 CET (UTC+1)				Stadium: MDCC-Arena

17 January 2022 21	Waldhof Mannheim	1–3	Borussia Dortmund II	Mannheim
19:00 CET (UTC+1)				Stadium: Carl-Benz-Stadion

22 January 2022 22	Würzburger Kickers	1–2	Waldhof Mannheim	Würzburg
14:00 CET (UTC+1)				Stadium: flyeralarm Arena

25 January 2022 23	Waldhof Mannheim	0–1	Viktoria Köln	Mannheim
19:00 CET (UTC+1)				Stadium: Carl-Benz-Stadion

30 January 2022 24	SV Meppen	1–1	Waldhof Mannheim	Meppen
14:00 CET (UTC+1)				Stadium: Hänsch-Arena

5 February 2022 25	Waldhof Mannheim	3–2	Viktoria Berlin	Mannheim
14:00 CET (UTC+1)				Stadium: Carl-Benz-Stadion

12 February 2022 26	Türkgücü München	0–0	Waldhof Mannheim	Munich
14:00 CET (UTC+1)				Stadium: Olympiastadion

20 February 2022 27	Waldhof Mannheim	0–0	1. FC Kaiserslautern	Mannheim
14:00 CET (UTC+1)				Stadium: Carl-Benz-Stadion

26 February 2022 28	Hallescher FC	1–2	Waldhof Mannheim	Halle
14:00 CET (UTC+1)				Stadium: Leuna Chemie Stadion

6 March 2022 29	Waldhof Mannheim	0–3	Eintracht Braunschweig	Mannheim
14:00 CET (UTC+1)				Stadium: Carl-Benz-Stadion

12 March 2022 30	SC Verl	1–3	Waldhof Mannheim
14:00 CET (UTC+1)

20 March 2022 31	Waldhof Mannheim	3–0	1860 Munich	Mannheim
14:00 CET (UTC+1)				Stadium: Carl-Benz-Stadion

3 April 2022 32	FSV Zwickau	1–1	Waldhof Mannheim	Zwickau
13:00 CEST (UTC+2)				Stadium: GGZ-Arena Zwickau

9 April 2022 33	1. FC Saarbrücken	0–0	Waldhof Mannheim	Saarbrücken
14:30 CEST (UTC+2)				Stadium: Ludwigsparkstadion

18 April 2022 34	Waldhof Mannheim	0–1	SC Freiburg II	Mannheim
19:00 CEST (UTC+2)				Stadium: Carl-Benz-Stadion

23 April 2022 35	VfL Osnabrück	1–2	Waldhof Mannheim	Osnabrück
14:00 CEST (UTC+2)				Stadium: Stadion an der Bremer Brücke

2 May 2022 36	Waldhof Mannheim	3–1	MSV Duisburg	Mannheim
19:00 CEST (UTC+2)				Stadium: Carl-Benz-Stadion

7 May 2022 37	Wehen Wiesbaden	1–1	Waldhof Mannheim	Wiesbaden
14:00 CEST (UTC+2)				Stadium: BRITA-Arena

14 May 2022 38	Waldhof Mannheim	7–0	TSV Havelse	Mannheim
13:30 CEST (UTC+2)				Stadium: Carl-Benz-Stadion
