= Kouadio =

Kouadio is an Ivorian given name and a surname. Notable people with the name include:

- Kouadio Konan Bertin (born 1968), Ivorian politician
- Kouadio-Yves Dabila (born 1997), Ivorian footballer
- Kouadio Otokpa (born 1959), Ivorian sprinter
- Kouadio Pascal (born 1986), Ivorian footballer
- Kouadio Pascal Doubaï (born 1992), Ivorian footballer
- Cédric Khaleb Kouadio (born 1997), Ivorian footballer
- Christ Kouadio (born 2001), Ivorian footballer
- Djétenan Kouadio (born 1960), Ivorian sprinter
- Eddy Kouadio (born 2006), Italian footballer
- Gastom Kouadio, Ivorian sprinter
- Germain Kouadio (born 1992), Ivorian footballer
- Jean Kouadio (born 2000), Italian-born Ivorian footballer
- Jeannot Ahoussou-Kouadio (born 1951), Ivorian politician
- Julien Kouadio (born 1999), Central African footballer
- Konan Serge Kouadio (born 1988), Ivorian footballer
- Lee Kouadio (born 1987), Ivorian footballer
- Léonce Kouadio (born 1998), Ivorian footballer
- Lionel Kouadio (born 2001), Ivorian basketball player
- Lucien Kassi-Kouadio (born 1963), Ivorian footballer
