= Parliament of Ivory Coast =

National legislature of Ivory Coast

Parliament Parlement

Type
- Type: Bicameral
- Houses: Senate; National Assembly

Leadership
- Chairperson of the Senate: Kandia Camara since 12 October 2023
- Speaker of the Assembly: Patrick Achi, RHDP since 17 January 2026
- Leader of the Minorities: Hervé N'Guessan

Structure
- Seats: 99 (Senate); 255 (National Assembly)

Elections
- Senate voting system: Indirect election
- National Assembly voting system: First-past-the-post
- Last Senate election: 16 September 2023
- Last National Assembly election: 27 December 2025

Meeting place
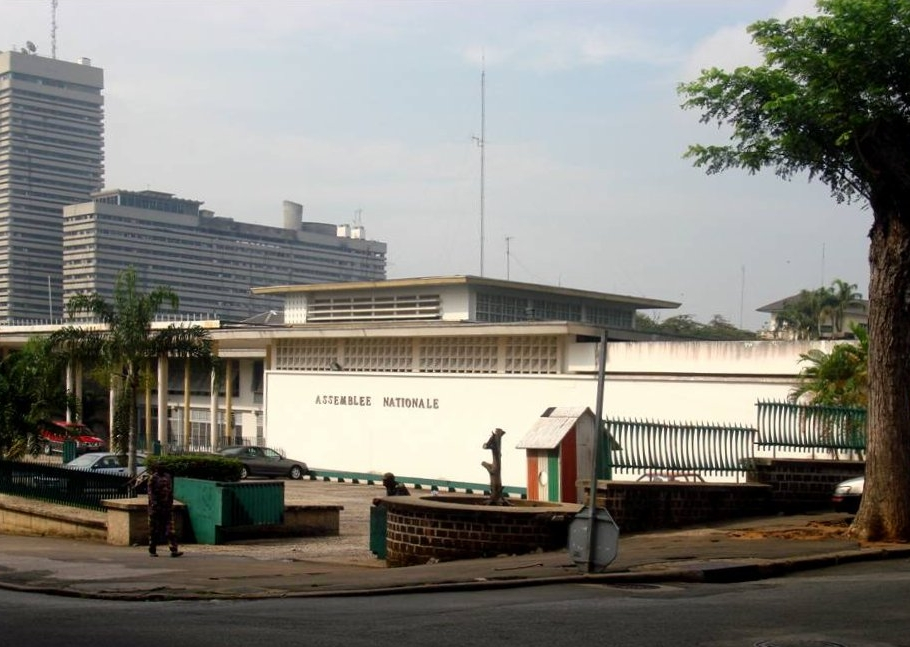
- Yamoussoukro (Senate); Abidjan (National Assembly)

The Parliament of Ivory Coast is the legislature of Ivory Coast. From 1960 to 2016, it was a unicameral body. It became a bicameral body after a new constitution was approved by referendum on 30 October 2016. The parliament consists of two chambers:

- The Senate (upper chamber)
- The National Assembly (lower chamber)

== Most recent elections ==
The most recent parliamentary elections were on 6 March 2021, with the Rally of Houphouëtists for Democracy and Peace winning the majority of seats. Five other parties are represented, and 26 representatives are independent of any political party.

The next election is slated for 27 December 2025.

== See also ==
- Politics of Ivory Coast
- List of legislatures by country
- Legislative branch
