= Vice President of Ivory Coast =

Political office of Ivory Coast

Vice President of the Republic of Côte d'Ivoire
- Vice président de la République de Côte d'Ivoire (French)
- Coat of arms of Ivory Coast

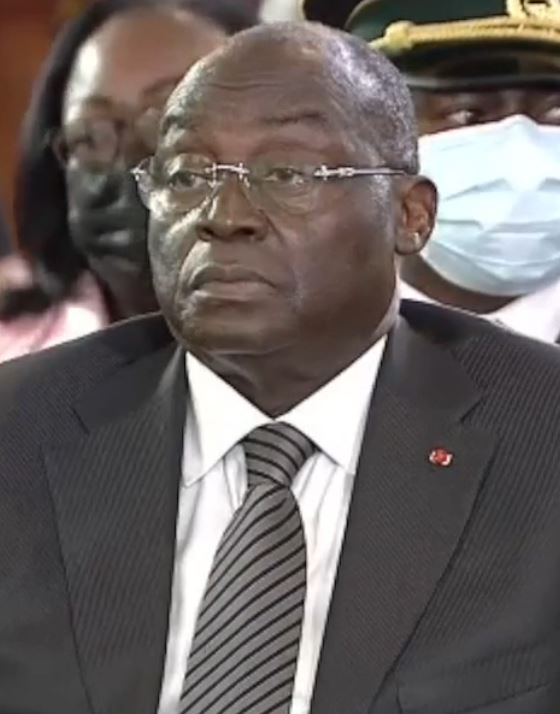
- Incumbent; Tiémoko Meyliet Koné since 19 April 2022
- Appointer: President of the Ivory Coast
- Term length: 5 years, renewable once
- Constituting instrument: Constitution of Ivory Coast (2016)
- Formation: 10 January 2017; 9 years ago
- First holder: Daniel Kablan Duncan

The vice president of the Republic of Ivory Coast, officially the Republic of Côte d'Ivoire, is the second-highest executive official in Ivory Coast. The vice president is appointed by the president, with the consent of the Parliament, composed of the National Assembly and the Senate. The Ivorian Constitution of 2016 initially provided for the vice president to be elected at the same time as the president by direct universal suffrage, as running mate of the presidential candidate. A constitutional revision announced by Ouattara before the 2020 presidential election, confirms the designation of the vice-president, appointed by the president with the consent of Parliament.

The vice president is the first person in the presidential line of succession and would ascend to the presidency upon the death or resignation of the president, or an absolute vacancy in the office. President Alassane Ouattara appointed Daniel Kablan Duncan as vice president in January 2017 after the 2016 Constitution was enacted.

== History ==
The office of vice president was first created in 1980, but it was abolished in 1985. The adoption of a new constitution in 2016 recreated the office of vice president.

== Eligibility ==
The same provisions of the 2016 Constitution for the president apply to a candidate for election as vice president.

== Duties ==
The duties of the vice president of Ivory Coast are:

- Presiding of various meetings in absence of the president
- Acting president when the president is out of the country
- ascend to the presidency upon the death or resignation of the president, or an absolute vacancy in the office

== List of officeholders ==
Political parties

Democratic Party of Ivory Coast – African Democratic Rally (PDCI–RDA)

Other factions

Independent

No.	Portrait	Name (Birth–Death)	Term of office			Political party	President
No.	Portrait	Name (Birth–Death)	Took office	Left office	Time in office	Political party	President
1		Daniel Kablan Duncan (born 1943)	10 January 2017	8 July 2020	3 years, 180 days	PDCI–RDA	Alassane Ouattara
Vacant (8 July 2020 – 19 April 2022)
2		Tiémoko Meyliet Koné (born 1949)	19 April 2022	Incumbent	4 years, 142 days	Independent	Alassane Ouattara
