= Roczen =

Roczen (Polish: Roczeń) is a surname which means "yearling" in Polish. Notable people with the surname include:

- Anthony Roczen (born 1999), German footballer
- Ken Roczen (born 1994), German motocross and supercross racer
