= Karine Aka Oulaté =

Karine Christelle Michelle Aka Oulaté
- Honours: Knight of the National Order of Merit, Citizen of the month

Karine Oulaté is a digital communication expert from Ivory Coast.

Oulaté studied in Ivory Coast then moved to France, where she studied tax, followed by human resources. While studying in France she played basketball for her university, until she suffered a knee injury and could no longer play.

In November 2022, she was elected citizen of the month by the government of Côte d'Ivoire, and was elevated to the rank of Knight of the National Order of Merit.
