= Senate of Ivory Coast =

Upper house of the Ivory Coast Parliament

Coordinates: 6.797267957484281°N 5.264875860968806°W

Senate Sénat
- Parliament of Ivory Coast

Type
- Type: Upper house

History
- Founded: 2016
- New session started: April 12, 2018

Leadership
- President: Kandia Camara since 12 October 2023

Structure
- Seats: 99 members
- Political groups: Government coalition: RHDP (58); Opposition: PDCI-RDA (6); Non-affiliated: Independents (2); Appointed (31)

Elections
- Voting system: Indirect election
- Last election: 16 September 2023

Meeting place
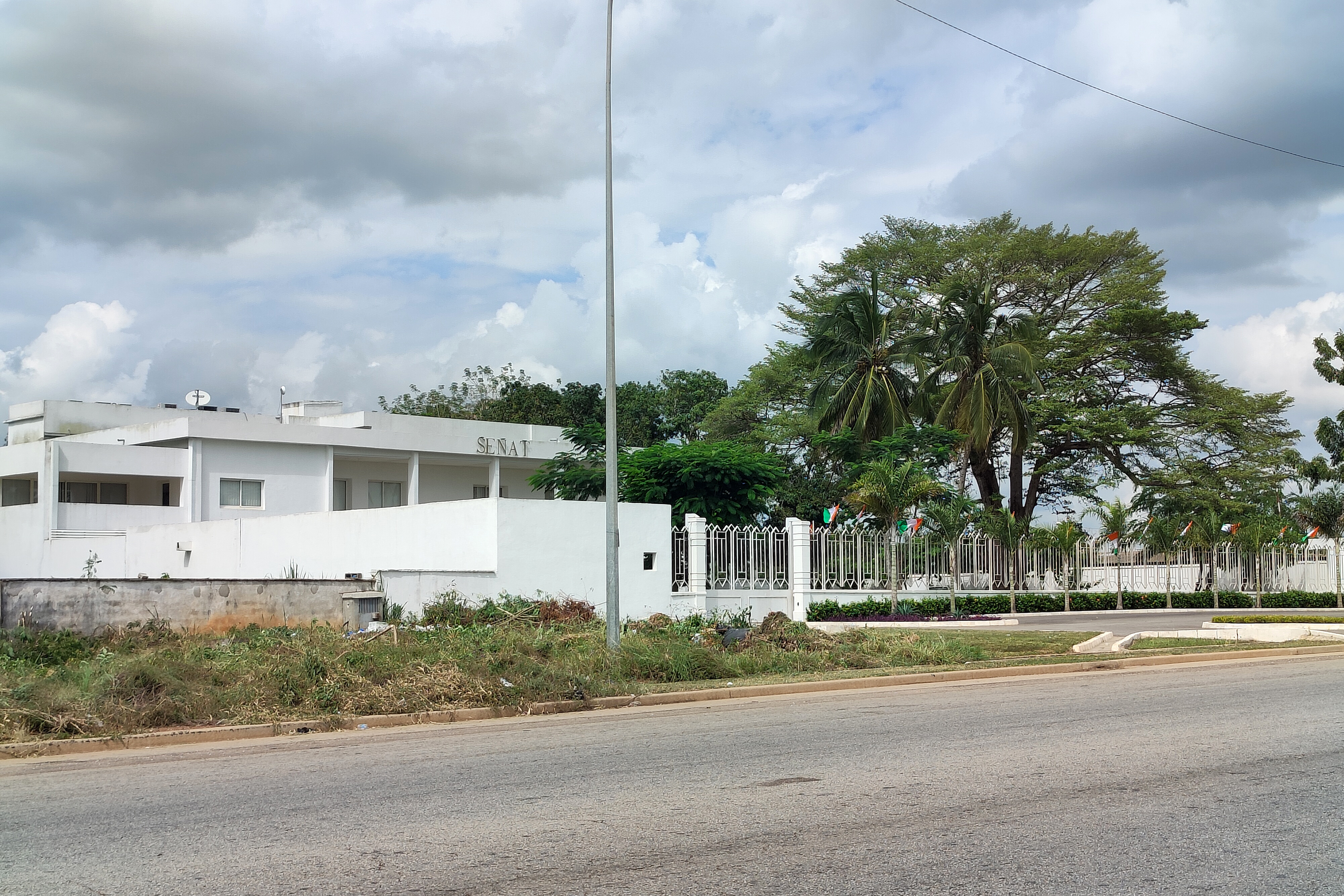
- Senate Building, Yamoussoukro

Website
- senat.ci

The Senate is the upper house of the Parliament of Ivory Coast. The Senate was created after a new constitution was approved by a referendum in 2016.

== History ==
The Senate first sat in 2018, after the first Ivorian senatorial election held on March 24, 2018. Under the constitution the Senate represents the regions.

== Electoral system ==
On February 14, 2018, the government of Ivory Coast decided the first Ivorian senatorial election will be held on March 24, 2018. It also established new rules on appointing senators, who are elected by National Assembly members, members of municipal, autonomous districts and regional councils. Each region and autonomous district has 2 senators elected and 1 appointed by the President. The Senate has 99 members, who serve five-year terms.

== Presidents of the Senate ==
Below is a list of presidents of the Senate:

Name	Took office	Left office	Notes
Jeannot Ahoussou-Kouadio	5 April 2018	12 October 2023	
Kandia Camara	12 October 2023	Incumbent	

== Senators of the 2018-2023 legislature ==
On 24 March 2018, 66 senators were elected. The president then appointed 33 senators.

Region	Elected members	Appointed members
Agnéby-Tiassa	Béhou Ekissi (Independent); Hyacinthe Amon Ekissi (Independent)	1
Bafing	Sarra Fadika (RHDP); Mamadou Diomandé (RHDP)	1
Bagoué	Nanourou Diarrassouba (RHDP); Losseni Dao (RHDP)	1
Bélier	Jeannot Ahoussou-Kouadio (RHDP); Louise Adjoua N'Go (RHDP)	1
Béré	Mamadou Bamba (Independent); Kanaté Dogomo (Independent)	1
Bounkani	Sansan Noufé (Independent); Kouakou Ouattara (Independent)	1
Cavally	Edouard Djouha Kéhi (RHDP); Paul Déhé (RHDP)	1
Folon	Chantal Fanny Moussokoura (RHDP); Baba Traoré (RHDP)	1
Gbêkê	Alain Cocauthrey Abla-Kouakou (Independent); René Koumoin Konan (Independent)	1
Gbôklé	Jean-Baptiste Pany (Independent); Amélie Beugré Orhon (Independent)	1
Gôh	André Logbo (RHDP); Fatouma Sangaré (RHDP)	1
Gontougo	Moïse Yao-Kouman (RHDP); Souleyman Touré (RHDP)	1
Grands-Ponts	Félix Memel Grah (Independent); Francis Bombro Lezou (Independent)	1
Guémon	Boniface Gueye (Independent); Evariste Sah Tiétémomon (Independent)	1
Hambol	Simon Ouattara Lamine (RHDP); Anzoumanan Ouattara (RHDP)	1
Haut-Sassandra	Seri Bi N'Guessan (RHDP); Lancine Touré (RHDP)	1
Iffou	Moïse Koumoué Koffi (RHDP); Delphin Kouadio Kpli Kouassi (RHDP)	1
Indénié-Djuablin	Abdoulaye Tano (RHDP); Amoikon Kouakou Banga (RHDP)	1
Kabadougou	Arouna N'Daho (RHDP); Siaka Koné (RHDP)	1
La Mé	Christophe Yapo Achi (RHDP); Zepp Atsé N'dé (RHDP)	1
Lôh-Djiboua	Adia Adido (RHDP); Manindja Touré (RHDP)	1
Marahoué	Lionel-Bernard Bassy-Koffi Koffi (RHDP); Charles Goueti Bi Soho (RHDP)	1
Moronou	Tiémoko Koffi (RHDP); Séraphin Boni Kouamé (RHDP)	1
Nawa	Adama Mané (RHDP); Bernard Gobo Yokoré (RHDP)	1
N'Zi	Emilienne Epse Bobi (RHDP); Bertin Kouadio Kouakou (RHDP)	1
Poro	Yaya Coulibaly (RHDP); Augustin Silué Kagnon (RHDP)	1
San-Pédro	Clément Boueka Nabo (RHDP); Alphonse Gosso Yabayou (RHDP)	1
Sud-Comoé	Germain Ollo Anouman (RHDP); Félix Famié Akattia Edoukou (RHDP)	1
Tchologo	Bakary Ouattara (RHDP); Bakary Sanogo (RHDP)	1
Tonkpi	Mamadou Cissé (RHDP); Seu Tia (RHDP)	1
Worodougou	Yaya Meité (RHDP); Vaflali Bakayoko (RHDP)	1
Autonomous Districts
Abidjan Autonomous District	Raymond N'Dohi Yapi (RHDP); Maman Ouattara (RHDP)	1
Yamoussoukro Autonomous District	Léon Kouamé Loukou (Independent); Gbeugré Konan Yao (Independent)	1
Total	66	33
