= 2018 Ivorian senatorial election =

- 24 March 2018
- 66 of 99 seats in the Senate; 50 seats needed for a majority
Party	Leader	Seats	+/–
RHDP	Alassane Ouattara	50	+50
Independents	–	16	+16
This lists parties that won seats. See the complete results below.
President of the Senate before	President of the Senate after
Position established	Jeannot Ahoussou-Kouadio

Senatorial elections were held for the first time in Ivory Coast on 24 March 2018.

== Electoral system ==
On 14 February 2018, the government of Ivory Coast ruled that the first senatorial election would be held on 24 March 2018. The government also established new rules on appointing senators, who will be elected by National Assembly members, members of municipal, autonomous districts and regional councils. Each region and autonomous district will have two elected senators. The Senate will have a total of 66 elected senators.

== Campaign ==
The campaign was held from 19 to 22 March 2018. With the opposition boycotting this election, it's expected it'll be widely won by the Rally of Houphouëtists for Democracy and Peace, which will present 33 lists of candidates, competing with a dozen of Independent lists of candidates.

On 13 March 2018, the Independent Electoral Commission announced 58 lists of candidates were selected for the senatorial election. These list has to be approved by the Constitutional Council.

== Results ==
Party	Votes	%	Seats
Rally of Houphouëtists for Democracy and Peace	4,663	78.30	50
Independents	1,292	21.70	16
Nominated senators			33
Total	5,955	100.00	99
Valid votes	5,955	96.52	
Invalid/blank votes	215	3.48	
Total votes	6,170	100.00	
Registered voters/turnout	7,010	88.02	
Source: CEI
