= Constitution of Ivory Coast =

National constitution

The Constitution of Ivory Coast was approved by referendum on October 30, 2016, and officially adopted on November 8, 2016.

Ivory Coast has had three constitutions.

== Previous constitutions ==
=== 1960 Constitution ===
On October 31, 1960, the National Assembly of Ivory Coast adopted the constitution establishing an independent republic. The 1960 constitution called for a strong, centralized presidential system with an independent judiciary and a national legislature.

As in much of the Ivorian political system, French influence weighed heavily in the preparation of the constitution. Félix Houphouët-Boigny and its other authors had received much of their formal political education and experience in France, and Houphouët-Boigny himself had been in successive French governments in the 1950s. Not unexpectedly, the 1960 constitution was largely taken (often verbatim) from the 1958 constitution of the French Fifth Republic. Like its French counterpart, the Ivorian constitution declares that all power derives from the people and is expressed through universal suffrage. It also mandates the separation of executive and legislative authority with limits on the power of the former.

In its preamble, the constitution proclaims its dedication to liberal democratic principles and inalienable human rights as expressed in the 1789 Declaration of the Rights of Man and of the Citizen and the 1948 Universal Declaration of Human Rights. Under the rubric "Of the State and Sovereignty", the initial articles of the constitution describe the symbols of the state — the flag, the motto and the national anthem — and name French the official language. Articles 3 to 7 delineate the fundamental rights and principles pertaining to Ivorian citizenship: universal suffrage, popular sovereignty and equality before the law. Significantly, in light of the government's subsequent coercive support of a single political party, Article 7 formally allows a multiparty system.

The first chapter directs that the government consist of executive, legislative and judicial branches. The three subsequent chapters list the powers accruing to each. The Ivorian Constitution provides for a strong executive, although it couches the language of power in democratic terms. For example, in keeping with the articulated principle of popular sovereignty, it provides that the National Assembly shall vote laws and consent to taxes but then limits the assembly's power by specifying exactly the matters on which the legislature may act. Matters constitutionally excluded from the legislature's purview automatically fall within that of the executive and are dealt with either by decree or by regulation. It also stipulates that the executive and the National Assembly share the power to initiate legislation, but the pertinent article appears in the chapter dealing with executive — not legislative — responsibilities. In fact, for most of Ivory Coast's brief history as an independent republic, nearly all legislative programs have originated with the president and have been rubber-stamped by the assembly.

The constitution also calls for a separate judiciary. As with the legislature, however, it makes the judiciary subordinate to the individual who guarantees its independence, that is, the president. It neither establishes nor protects a judiciary independent of or opposed to the government. It does provide for the Supreme Court and a subordinate court system; nevertheless, it does not stipulate the exact structure of the judiciary, a task that officially was to be done by the National Assembly. In fact, the assembly simply approved the president's plan.

The ninth chapter establishes the Economic and Social Council (Conseil Economique et Social), the purpose of which is to advise the president on matters pertaining to economic development and social change. The final two chapters provide procedures for amending and adopting the constitution.

The constitution guaranteed most of the usual rights and freedoms. Among those not protected, however, were freedom of the press and assembly.

=== 2000 Constitution ===
Following the bloodless coup of 1999, General Robert Guéï formed a government of national unity and promised open elections. A new constitution was drafted and ratified by the population in summer 2000.

Ivory Coast's constitution of the Second Republic provides for a strong presidency within the framework of a separation of powers. The executive is personified in the president, elected for a five-year term. The president is the head of state and commander in chief of the armed forces, may negotiate and ratify certain treaties, and may submit a bill to a national referendum or to the National Assembly. According to the constitution, the president of the National Assembly assumes the presidency for 45–90 days in the event of a vacancy and organizes new elections in which the winner completes the remainder of the deceased president's term. The president selects the prime minister, who is the head of government. The cabinet is selected by and is responsible to the prime minister.

The unicameral National Assembly is composed of 225 members elected by direct universal suffrage for a 5-year term concurrently with the president. It passes on legislation typically introduced by the president, although it also can introduce legislation.

The judicial system culminates in the Supreme Court. The High Court of Justice is competent to try government officials for major offenses. There is also an independent Constitutional Council which has seven members appointed by the president that is responsible for, amongst other duties, the determination of candidate eligibility in presidential and legislative elections, the announcement of final election results, the conduct of referendums and the constitutionality of legislation.

Ivory Coast is divided into five levels of administrative subdivision, but these divisions are not written into the constitution. It is divided into 14 first-level districts, 31 second-level regions, 108 third-level departments and 510 fourth-level sub-prefectures. By law, districts are to be headed by governors appointed by the central government; however, by 2016, only two of the 14 districts have had governors nominated, so most of the districts have not yet become functional governmental entities. Each region and department is headed by a prefect appointed by the central government. Sub-prefectures are headed by sub-prefects, also appointed by the central government. In 2002, the country held its first departmental elections to select departmental councils to oversee local infrastructure development and maintenance as well as economic and social development plans and projects. Where needed, there are 197 fifth-level communes, each headed by an elected mayor.

== 2016 Constitution ==
During the 2015 Ivory Coast presidential election, President Alassane Ouattara promised a new constitution to replace the 2000 one, which he said was responsible for years of turmoil and war, with the First Ivorian Civil War and the Second Ivorian Civil War.

On June 1, 2016, Ouattara created an expert panel to draft a new constitution. This draft was approved by the National Assembly on October 11, 2016, with a strong majority.

The proposed constitution had to be approved by a referendum, which was held on October 30, 2016. Based on provisional results given by the Independent Electoral Commission on November 1, 2016, the proposed constitution was approved with 93.42% of votes.

The constitution includes many innovations.

=== Conditions of eligibility to the Presidency ===
Under the constitution, a candidate must be "exclusively Ivorian, born of a father or of a mother Ivorian by birth". In addition, the constitution lowers the minimum age limit for presidential candidates to 35 years and abolishes the upper age limit, which was 75 years.

=== Executive ===
The president and vice-president were to run on a joint ticket (from 2020) and the latter would replace the former in case of death, resignation and any other vacancy. It was expected that President Ouattara would appoint a vice-president, after the new constitution was ratified. His choice must be approved be the Constitutional Council.

A constitutional revision announced by Ouattara before the 2020 presidential election, confirmed the designation of the vice-president, appointed by the president with the consent of parliament.

=== Senate ===
The parliament was to be composed of two legislative chambers: the National Assembly and a new Senate. The senate was expected to represent the interests of territorial collectivities and Ivorians living abroad. Two thirds of the senate were to be elected at the same time as the general election. The remaining one third would be appointed by the president-elect. The two chambers share legislative functions and must approve all laws, including those relating to the budget. In case of persistent disagreement between the two chambers, the president of the republic can request the assembly to adopt definitively the law.

=== Bill of rights ===
The bill of rights strengthens the rights of vulnerable groups, particularly children, women and persons with disabilities. It makes the right to education compulsory for children, boys and girls. The prohibition of child labor further lays the background for the implementation of the right to education. The draft also requires the state to promote women's participation in public affairs, the modalities of implementation of which must be given effect in subsequent laws. Furthermore, the state should act to ensure gender equality in employment and to encourage women to occupy posts of responsibilities. Considering that the draft does not establish a specific organization dedicated to promoting women's rights, this will be a mission for the ministerial department in charge of women's affairs.

Rights to a healthy environment were also added. The preamble condemns any unconstitutional attempt to change government (including the 1999 coup d'état) or to maintain power (including the 2010–11 Ivorian crisis).
