= Onur Ünlüçifçi =

German-Turkish footballer (born 1997)

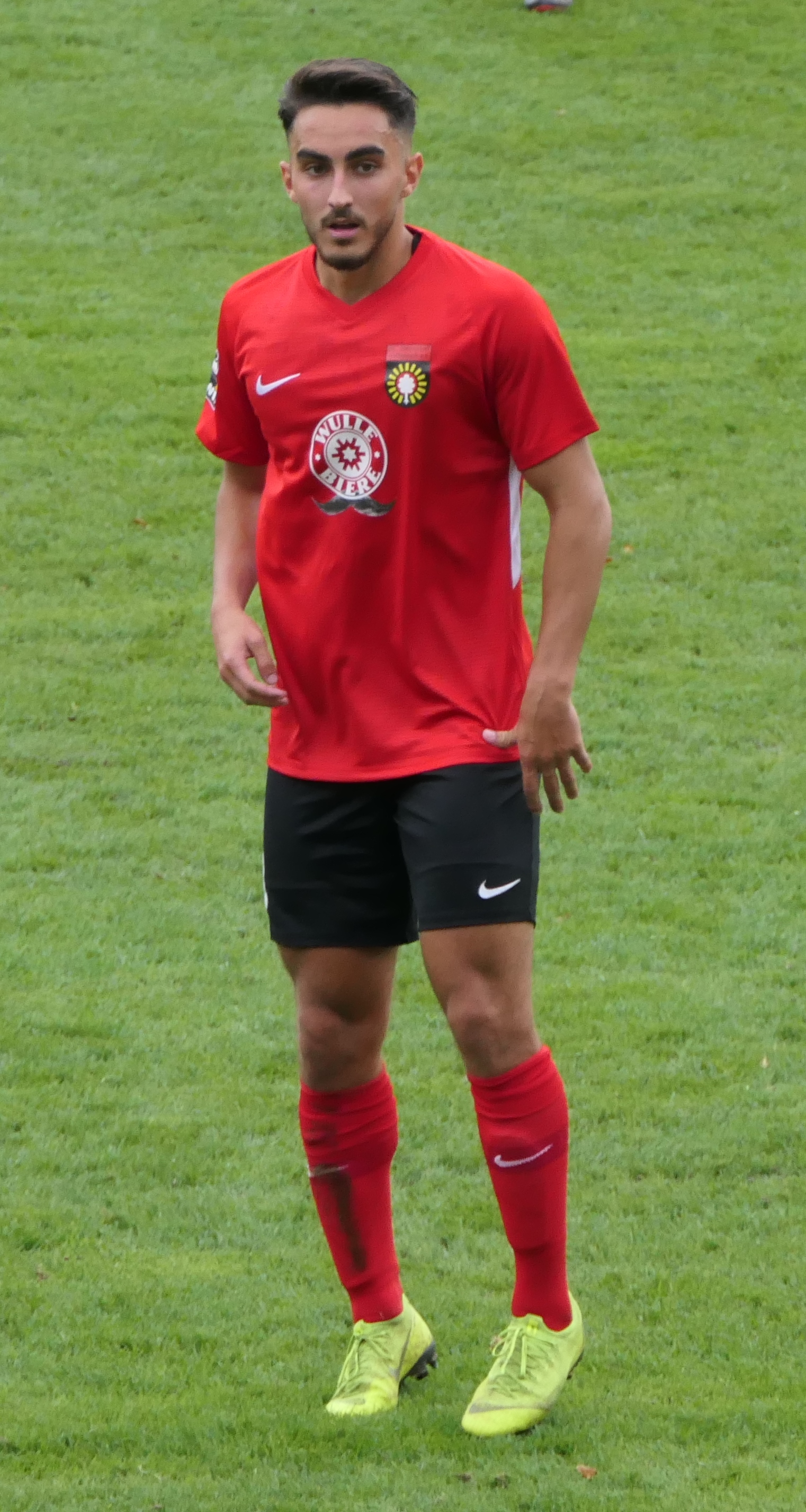
- Ünlüçifçi with Sonnenhof Großaspach in 2019

Personal information
- Date of birth: 24 April 1997 (age 29)
- Place of birth: Frankfurt, Germany
- Height: 1.78 m (5 ft 10 in)
- Position: Midfielder

Youth career
- Eintracht Frankfurt
- –2016: FSV Frankfurt

Senior career*
Years	Team	Apps	(Gls)
2016–2019	Würzburger Kickers II	50	(21)
2018–2019	Würzburger Kickers	5	(0)
2019–2020	Sonnenhof Großaspach	20	(0)
2020–2022	Waldhof Mannheim	11	(0)
2022–2024	FSV Frankfurt	51	(12)
2024–2026	Kickers Offenbach	40	(9)
- * Club domestic league appearances and goals as of 17:30, 24 September 2026 (UTC)

Onur Ünlüçifçi (born 24 April 1997) is a German–Turkish professional footballer who plays as a midfielder.
