= Tiémoko Meyliet Koné =

2nd Vice President of Ivory Coast

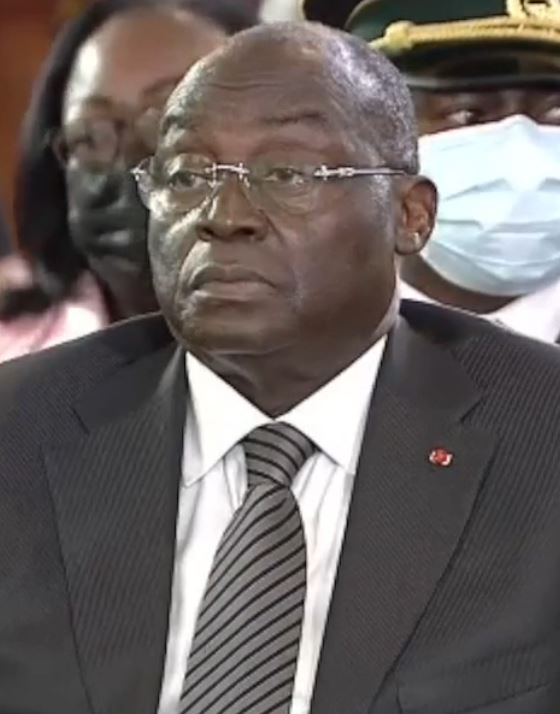
- Koné in 2022

2nd Vice President of Ivory Coast
- Incumbent
- Assumed office 19 April 2022
- President: Alassane Ouattara
- Preceded by: Daniel Kablan Duncan

Governor of Central Bank of West African States
- In office 2011–2022
- Preceded by: Jean-Baptiste Compaoré
- Succeeded by: Jean-Claude Brou

Personal details
- Born: 26 April 1949 (age 77) Tafiré, French West Africa (now Ivory Coast)
- Party: Independent
- Children: 5

Tiémoko Meyliet Koné (born 26 April 1949) is an Ivorian economist and politician who has served as Vice-President of Ivory Coast since April 2022.

== Early life ==
Koné was born 26 April 1949 in Tafiré located in the Niakaramandougou Department in Hambol Region, Vallée du Bandama District. He is part of the Senoufo ethnic group. He is married and has 5 children.

== Career ==
Koné joined the Central Bank of West African States (BCEAO) in 1975. He served as BCEAO National Director and Alternate Governor at the IMF from 1991 to 1998.

Koné was Chairman of the Board of Directors of the UEMOA Pension Fund (CRRAE-UEMOA) from 1996 to 2006. During his career at the BCEAO, he became good friends with another Ivorian banker, Alassane Ouattara. In 2007, Ouattara encouraged new Prime Minister Guillaume Soro to take Koné as chief of staff. He served as chief of staff from 2007 to 2010.

Koné became Minister of Construction, Urban Planning and Housing in 2010 in the Soro government, then Special Advisor to the President of the Republic, in charge of Economic and Monetary Affairs. In September 2017, he was elected as a member of the Board of Directors of the Alliance for Financial Inclusion (AFI) in which he represented the regions of sub-Saharan Africa, the Middle East and South Africa. He served as BCEAO governor from 2011 to 2022.

Koné was appointed Vice President of Ivory Coast by Alassane Ouattara on 19 April 2022. He thus became the deputy of the President. He was sworn in on 20 April 2022 by the Constitutional Council. President Ouattara commented; "Tiémoko Meyliet Koné is a brilliant economist, an outstanding technocrat, a competent and hardworking man who has my full trust".

== Recognition ==
- Grand Officer of the National Order of Benin and Officer of the French Legion of Honor
- Commander of the National Order of Ivory Coast
- Commander of the National Order of Guinea Bissau
- Commander of the International Academic Palms from CAMES (African and Malagasy Council for Higher Education).
