= Carl-Benz-Stadion =

Stadium in Mannheim, Germany

Coordinates: 49°28′46″N 8°30′09″E

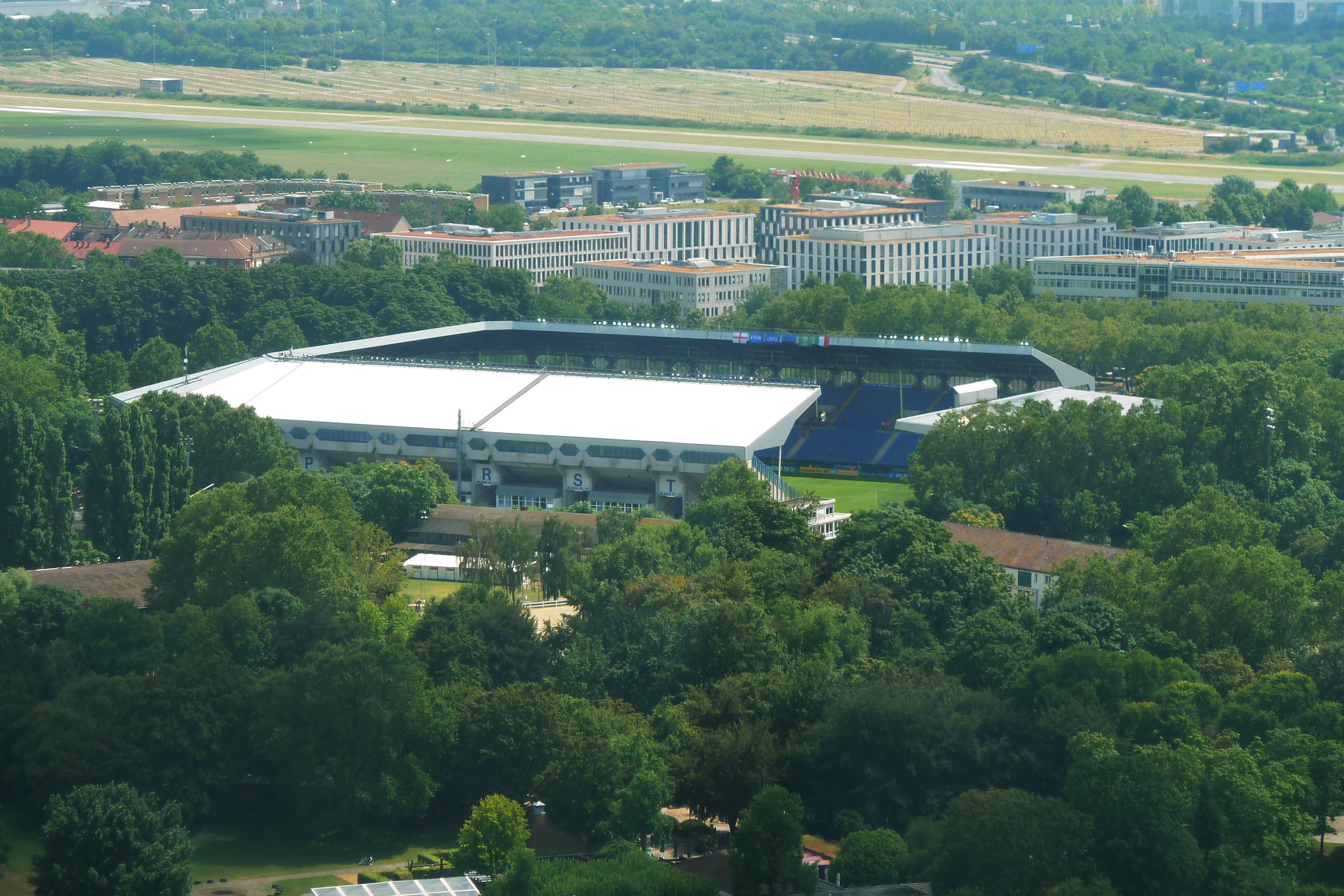
- Interactive map of Carl-Benz-Stadion
- Location: Mannheim, Germany
- Capacity: 25,667

Construction
- Opened: 1994
- Architect: Folker Fiebiger

Tenants
- SV Waldhof Mannheim (1994–present); TSG 1899 Hoffenheim (2008)

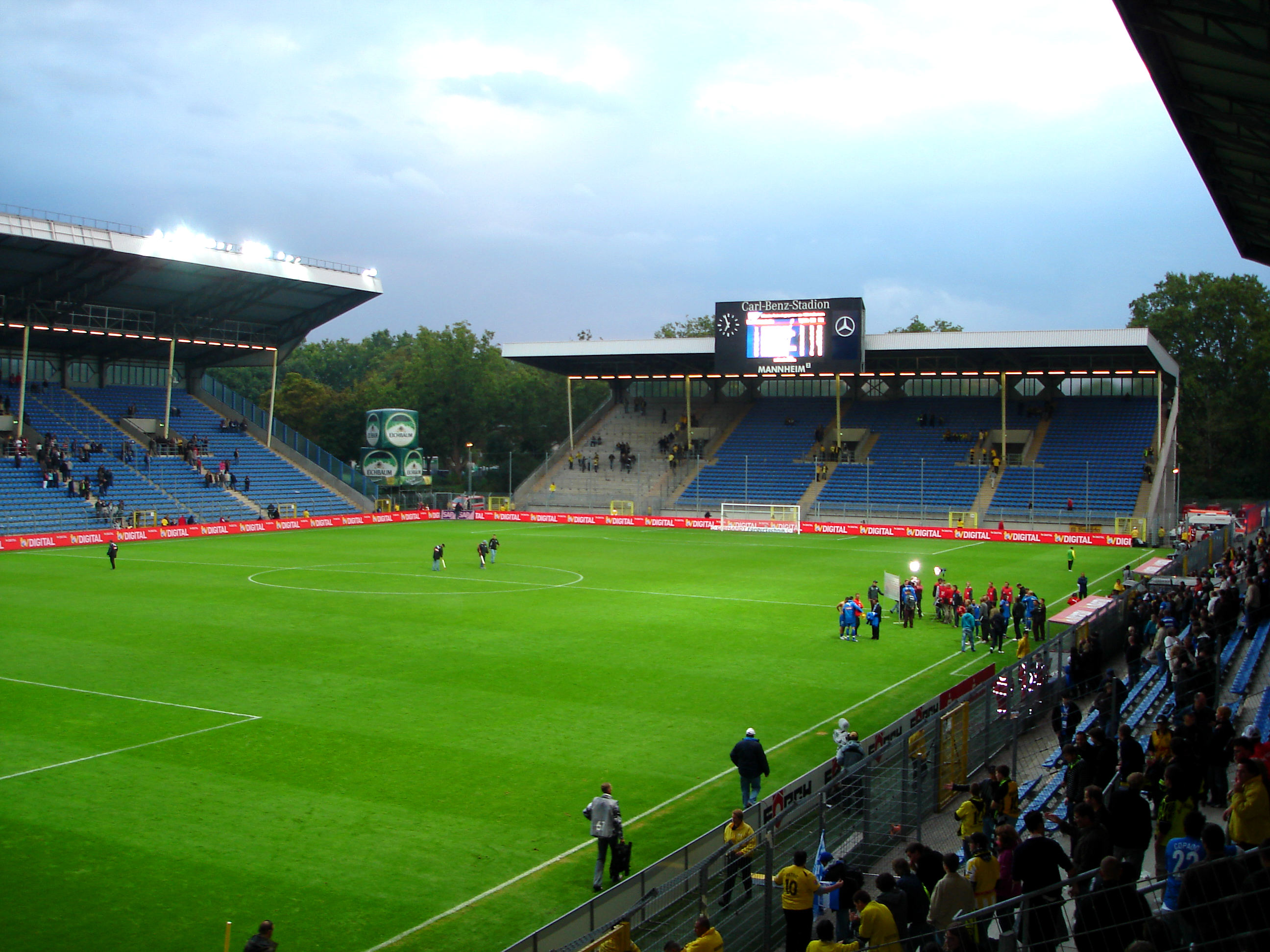
Carl-Benz-Stadion

Carl-Benz-Stadion is a multi-purpose stadium in Mannheim, Germany. It is currently used mostly for football matches and is the home stadium of SV Waldhof Mannheim. In 2008, it also hosted TSG 1899 Hoffenheim for the first half of that club's first season in the Bundesliga, until Hoffenheim's new stadium opened in January 2009. The stadium is able to hold 27,000 people and was built in 1994. The stadium was last renovated in 2019 to 3. Liga standards following Waldhof's promotion from the Regionalliga Südwest. The architect was Folker Fiebiger. The Mannheim stadium was completed in 1927 on the site of today's Carl Benz stadium. It had a track and field track, held 35,000 spectators and played an international friendly match between Germany and Switzerland in 1929 that Germany won by 7–1.

== See also ==
- List of football stadiums in Germany
- Lists of stadiums
