= 2023 Ivorian senatorial election =

- 16 September 2023
- 66 of 99 seats in the Senate; 50 seats needed for a majority
Party	Leader	Seats	+/–
RHDP	Alassane Ouattara	58	+8
PDCI–RDA	Philippe Cowppli-Bony	6	+6
Independents	–	2	−14
This lists parties that won seats. See the complete results below.
President of the Senate before	President of the Senate after
Jeannot Ahoussou-Kouadio	Kandia Camara

Senatorial elections were held in Ivory Coast on 16 September 2023.

== Context ==
Members of the electoral college were renewed in the 2023 Ivorian local elections on 2 September 2023, with a landslide victory for the ruling RHDP.

== Electoral system ==
Senators are elected by members of municipal, autonomous districts and regional councils. In each region and autonomous district, two senators are elected by the members of this electoral college, while the president nominates a third one. The Senate thus has a total of 99 senators, 66 elected and 33 nominated.

== Results ==
Party	Votes	%	+/–	Seats	+/–
Rally of Houphouëtists for Democracy and Peace	6,404	74.63	-3.67	58	+8
PDCI–RDA	1,061	12.36	New	6	+6
PDCI–RDA–PPA–CI joint list	202	2.35	New	0	–
African People's Party – Côte d'Ivoire (PPA–CI)	106	1.24	New	0	–
Ivorian Popular Front (FPI)	56	0.65	New	0	–
Independents	752	8.76	-12.94	2	-14
Nominated senators				33	–
Total	8,581	100.00	–	99	–
Valid votes	8,581	98.87			
Invalid votes	51	0.59			
Blank votes	47	0.54			
Total votes	8,679	100.00			
Registered voters/turnout	9,535	91.02			
Source: CEI
