= Jean Kouadio =

Italian-born Ivorian footballer

Personal information
- Full name: Jean Enrico Kouadio
- Date of birth: 11 January 2000 (age 26)
- Place of birth: Palermo, Italy
- Height: 1.76 m (5 ft 9 in)
- Position: Forward

Youth career
- Como

Senior career*
Years	Team	Apps	(Gls)
2019–2021	Como	1	(0)
2020–2021	→ NibionnOggiono (loan)	0	(0)
2021	→ Arconatese (loan)	4	(0)
- * Club domestic league appearances and goals as of 19 Jun 2021

Jean Enrico Kouadio (born 11 January 2000) is an Italian-born Ivorian footballer who plays as a forward.

== Career ==
=== Como ===
A product of the club's youth academy, Kouadio made his league debut for the club on 23 October 2019, coming on as a late substitute for Dario Toninelli in a 2–0 away defeat to Carrarese.

On 2 October 2020 he was loaned to Serie D club NibionnOggiono.

On 2 March 2021 he moved on a new loan to Arconatese, again in Serie D.
