= Léonce Kouadio =

German-Ivorian footballer

Personal information
- Full name: Emmanuel Léonce Kouadio
- Date of birth: 27 December 1998 (age 27)
- Place of birth: Vavoua, Ivory Coast
- Height: 1.80 m (5 ft 11 in)
- Position: Right-back

Team information
- Current team: Rot-Weiß Koblenz
- Number: 23

Youth career
- –2011: VfR Friesenheim
- 2011–2015: 1899 Hoffenheim
- 2015–2016: 1. FC Heidenheim
- 2016–2017: VfL Bochum

Senior career*
Years	Team	Apps	(Gls)
2018–2019	TSG Sprockhövel	0	(0)
2019–2020	Wormatia Worms	3	(1)
2020	Waldhof Mannheim II	6	(0)
2020–2022	Waldhof Mannheim	5	(0)
2022–	Rot-Weiß Koblenz	11	(0)
- * Club domestic league appearances and goals as of 13 November 2022

Emmanuel Léonce Kouadio (born 27 December 1998) is a German-Ivorian professional footballer who plays as a right-back for Rot-Weiß Koblenz.
