= Kouadio Konan Bertin =

Ivorian politician (born 1968)

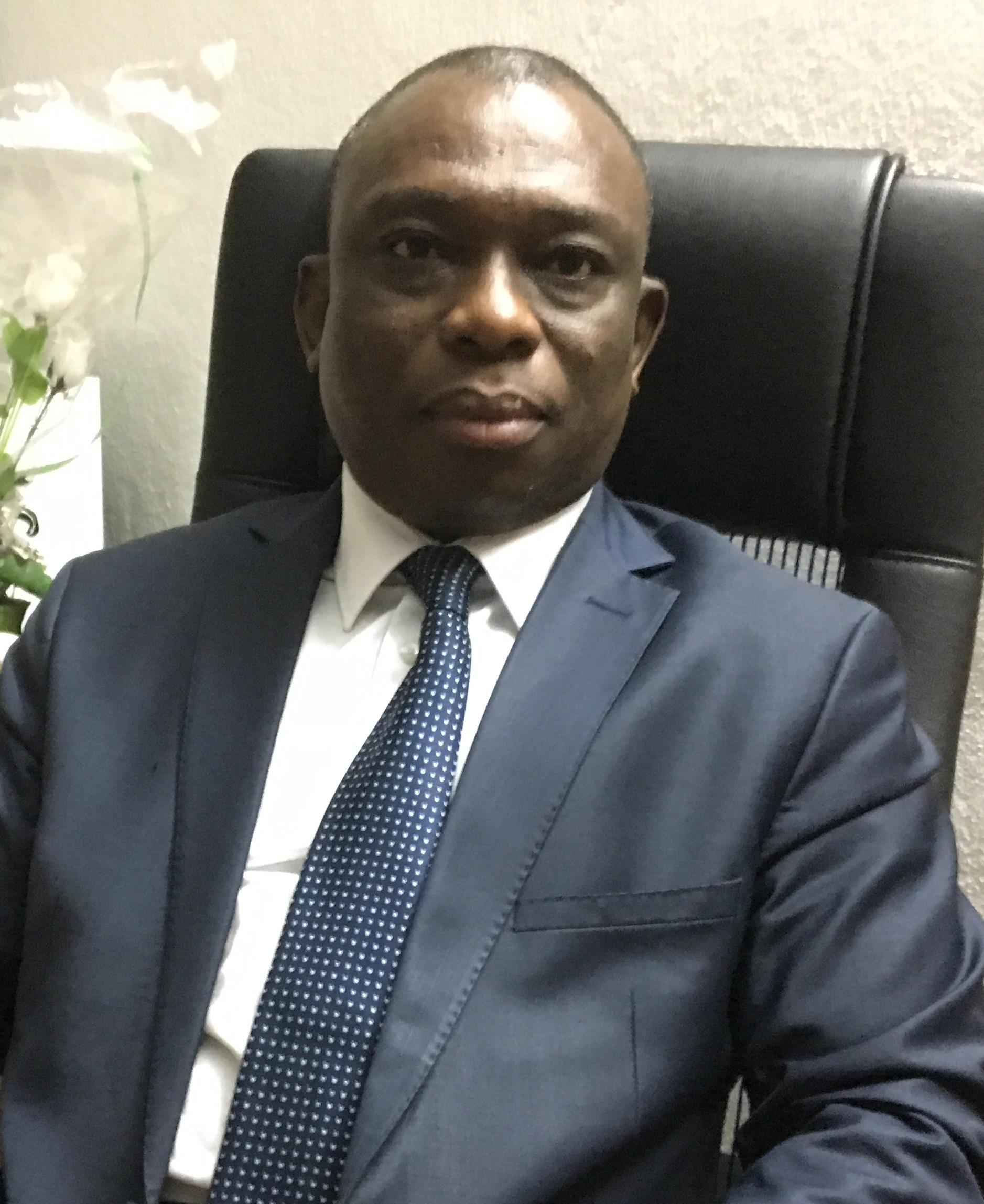
- Bertin in 2016

Youth President of the Democratic Party of Ivory Coast
- In office 2003–2013

Member of the Political Bureau of the Democratic Party of Ivory Coast
- Incumbent
- Assumed office May 29, 2003

Member of the National Assembly (Ivory Coast) for Port-Bouët
- In office December 11, 2011 – December 18, 2016

Personal details
- Born: December 26, 1968 (age 57) Lakota Department, Ivory Coast
- Party: Democratic Party of Ivory Coast; Independent

Kouadio Konan Bertin (born December 26, 1968), known as KKB, is an Ivorian politician. He represented Port-Bouët in the National Assembly from 2011 to 2016.

He ran for president for the first time in 2015, when he came in third. He was one of the four candidates for the 2020 Ivorian presidential election, in which he received 1.99% of the vote.

== Early life and education ==
Kouadio Konan Bertin was born in Lakota in southern Ivory Coast to a Dida mother, Delphine Dago Guizo, and a Baoulé father, Koffi Kouadio Mathieu. He defines himself as "the fruit of an Ivorian crossbreed." He is the oldest of six siblings.

As a student at the University of Abidjan, he opposed the dominance of the Student Federation of Ivory Coast, which he deemed too radical. Instead, he created the Cell for Reflection and Concrete Action (CERAC) in 1994.

He obtained a master's degree in German, with a focus on corporate communication. He considers himself "a pure product of Ivorian public education before the crisis."

== Political career ==
=== Entry ===
KKB became active in the youth wing of the Democratic Party of Ivory Coast (PDCI), supporting President Félix Houphouët-Boigny and then President Henri Konan Bédié, who succeeded him after his death in December 1993. For his efforts, the young politician quickly gained the confidence and the ear of the head of state.

=== 1999 Ivorian coup d'état ===
He emerged on the political scene as an opponent of the coup that replaced Bédié with General Robert Guéï in December 1999.

While party elders sought to discreetly rid themselves of the former president by removing him as head of the party, KKB, then largely unknown to the general public, mobilized students in opposition to the military junta to demand the return of the exiled former president from France.

At the Extraordinary Party Congress on April 6–9, 2000, the attempt to oust Bédié as president of the PDCI failed.

=== PDCI cadre ===
In 2003, after Bédié returned from exile, KKB was elected youth president of the PDCI.

He supported Bédié's candidacy in the first round of the 2010 presidential election, but the PDCI leader only received 25% of the vote and landed in third place, far behind incumbent president Laurent Gbagbo (FPI, 38%) and Alassane Ouattara (RDR, 32%). After demanding a recount, Bédié eventually threw his support behind Ouattara, which proved decisive. This was in line with an alliance, the Rally of Houphouëtists for Democracy and Peace (RHDP), formed five years earlier by a number of parties including the PDCI and the Rally of the Republicans (RDR).

In the 2011 Ivorian parliamentary election, KKB was elected to represent the Port-Bouët constituency with 93.81% of the vote.

=== L'appel de Daoukro ===
The alliance initiated by Bédié and Ouattara subsequently went further than the mandates of the RHDP. On September 17, 2014, the president of the PDCI announced "l'appel de Daoukro" ("the call of Daoukro"), in which he called on his party members to rally around Ouattara's candidacy, well ahead of the 2015 presidential election.

This caused a serious crisis within the PDCI, which at the October 2013 party congress had called for the candidacy of an "active PDCI activist" for the presidency. KKB was the first to openly describe Bédié's move as "treason."

On February 26, 2015, two days before the PDCI congress that would officially back Ouattara as the only RHDP candidate, KKB and three other party members (former prime minister Charles Konan Banny, former Foreign Minister Amara Essy, and parliament member Jérôme Kablan Brou) announced their decision not to attend the event. KKB predicted at the time that Bédié and his followers might leave the PDCI for the RDR, but he refused to leave his party and create another, arguing it would be a betrayal of the party's founder, Félix Houphouët-Boigny.

At the party congress, the "call of Daoukro" was adopted with "Brezhnevian unanimity," Le Monde wrote. The decision to not put forward a PDCI candidate was approved by 98.84% of the party. Critics claimed that the near-unanimity was attributable to the fact that the vote was taken by a public show of hands.

=== Candidate in the 2015 presidential election ===
On December 5, 2014, KKB announced his candidacy for the 2015 Ivorian presidential election. He said, "I am the candidate to save the PDCI. Because to not have a candidate in 2015 is to jointly put to death the party of Félix Houphouët-Boigny." He submitted his independent candidacy to the Independent Electoral Commission on August 25, 2015.

His campaign was not successful, however. In the election on October 25, he came in third place with 3.88% of the vote, behind the incumbent Outtara at 83.66% and the Ivorian Popular Front candidate Pascal Affi N’Guessan at 9.29%.

=== Reconciliation with Henri Konan Bédié ===
During a meeting in Bingerville on April 10, 2017, the PDCI agreed to appoint a candidate from its own ranks for the presidential election in 2020. Two months later, KKB reconnected with his party. He said: "Our split was about one thing: The PDCI giving up its candidacy in the presidential election." Dissent subsequently increased between the two main allied parties of the RHDP, with Bédié declaring that the alliance as it was in 2005 "no longer existed." The PDCI then in effect became the primary opposition party against Ouattara.

Two years after returning to the party, KKB met with Bédié, and they agreed to work together to return the PDCI to power. KKB voiced his opposition to Ouattara remaining in power, telling TV5 Monde, "When you are the head of state, you must at least know how to count to two."

In June 2020, KKB submitted himself as a candidate for the internal vote within the PDCI, which would nominate a candidate for the 2020 election. But on July 2, his candidacy was rejected by the party due to procedural errors. Bédié was elected, according to the PDCI general secretariat, by 99.67% of the internal votes. Radio France Internationale suggested that Bédié had removed any internal competition in order to avoid risking a loss.

=== Candidate in the 2020 presidential election ===
In a press conference on July 7, KKB denounced the decision to remove him from the PDCI primary campaign. He decided to run once again as an independent instead.

On September 14, 2020, the Constitutional Council announced that only four of the 44 declared presidential candidates would actually be eligible to run. The four candidates are: incumbent president Alassane Ouattara, Henri Konan Bédié, Pascal Affi N'Guessan, and Kouadio Konan Bertin. These were the only candidates to receive the required signatures from at least 1% of all voters in 17 regions of the country, according to the Constitutional Council. Against the backdrop of pre-electoral violence and one month before the vote on October 31, Bédié called for "civil disobedience." He was rapidly joined in this call by Affi N'Guessan.

Asked if he would be joining this opposition effort, KKB said on September 24 that "Ivory Coast needs peace." He added: "I am not participating in that which divides Ivory Coast. I do not endorse this kind of venture." In an interview with Jeune Afrique on October 1, KKB reiterated his refusal to support the two candidates' call for a boycott of the election.

He held his official campaign launch on October 4, 2020, in front of a crowd of 2,500 supporters. He said: "This election should be a precious moment when we peacefully debate and decide our future. Alas, the ferments of division are already spreading. Faced with this perilous situation, yes, I have decided to present my candidacy for the presidential election."

Despite his insistence on staying in the race, he "commands little broad support" and was not expected to defeat the incumbent Ouattara.

KKB received 1.99% of the vote, second behind Outtara, who gained 94% of the vote amid the opposition's boycott.

=== Since 2021 ===
In September 2021, a Cameroonian artist named Sophie Dencia living in Côte d'Ivoire accused Kouadio Konan Bertin of rape committed in April 2021, and filed an official complaint. The politician responded that he had "nothing to reproach myself for" and filed a defamation complaint.

Since 2024, he has served as Ivory Coast's ambassador to Gabon.
