= Anthony Roczen =

German footballer

Personal information
- Date of birth: 16 August 1999 (age 27)
- Place of birth: Berlin, Germany
- Height: 1.91 m (6 ft 3 in)
- Position: Forward

Team information
- Current team: VSG Altglienicke
- Number: 33

Youth career
- –2012: LFC Berlin
- 2012–2018: Hertha BSC
- 2018: Union Berlin

Senior career*
Years	Team	Apps	(Gls)
2018–2019	Hertha BSC II	19	(11)
2019–2020	FC Magdeburg	19	(1)
2020–2022	Waldhof Mannheim	7	(0)
2022–2023	RSV Eintracht 1949	2	(0)
2023–2024	VSG Altglienicke	14	(5)
2024–2025	Hallescher FC	8	(0)
2025	→ VSG Altglienicke (loan)	5	(1)
2025–	VSG Altglienicke	2	(0)
- * Club domestic league appearances and goals as of 9 October 2025

Anthony Roczen (born 16 August 1999) is a German professional footballer who plays as a forward for Regionalliga Nordost club VSG Altglienicke.

== Career ==
Roczen made his professional debut for 1. FC Magdeburg in the 3. Liga on 28 July 2019, coming on as a substitute in the 78th minute for Sören Bertram in the 0–0 away draw against FSV Zwickau.
