= 2020 Ivorian presidential election =

- 31 October 2020
- Turnout: 53.90%
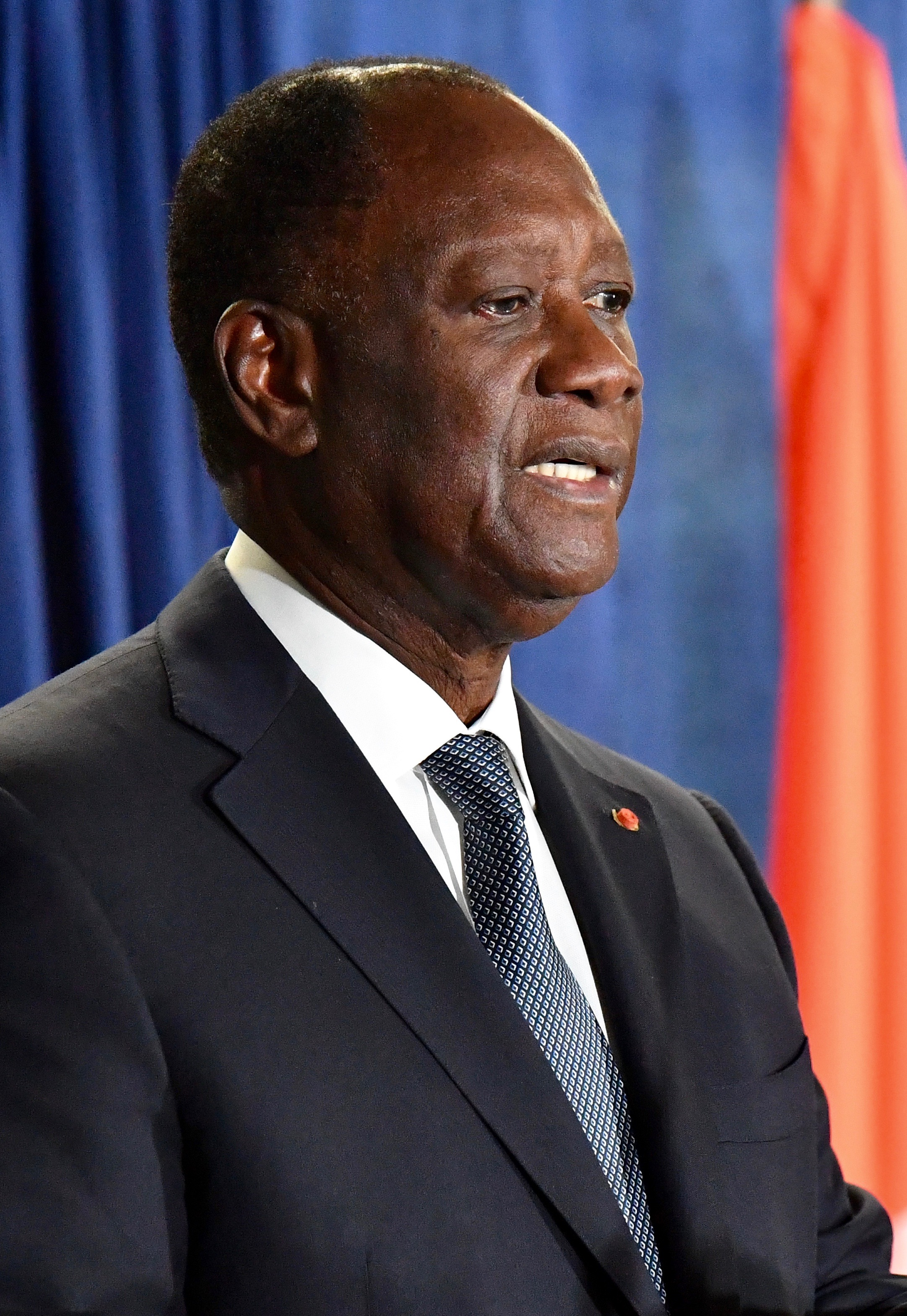

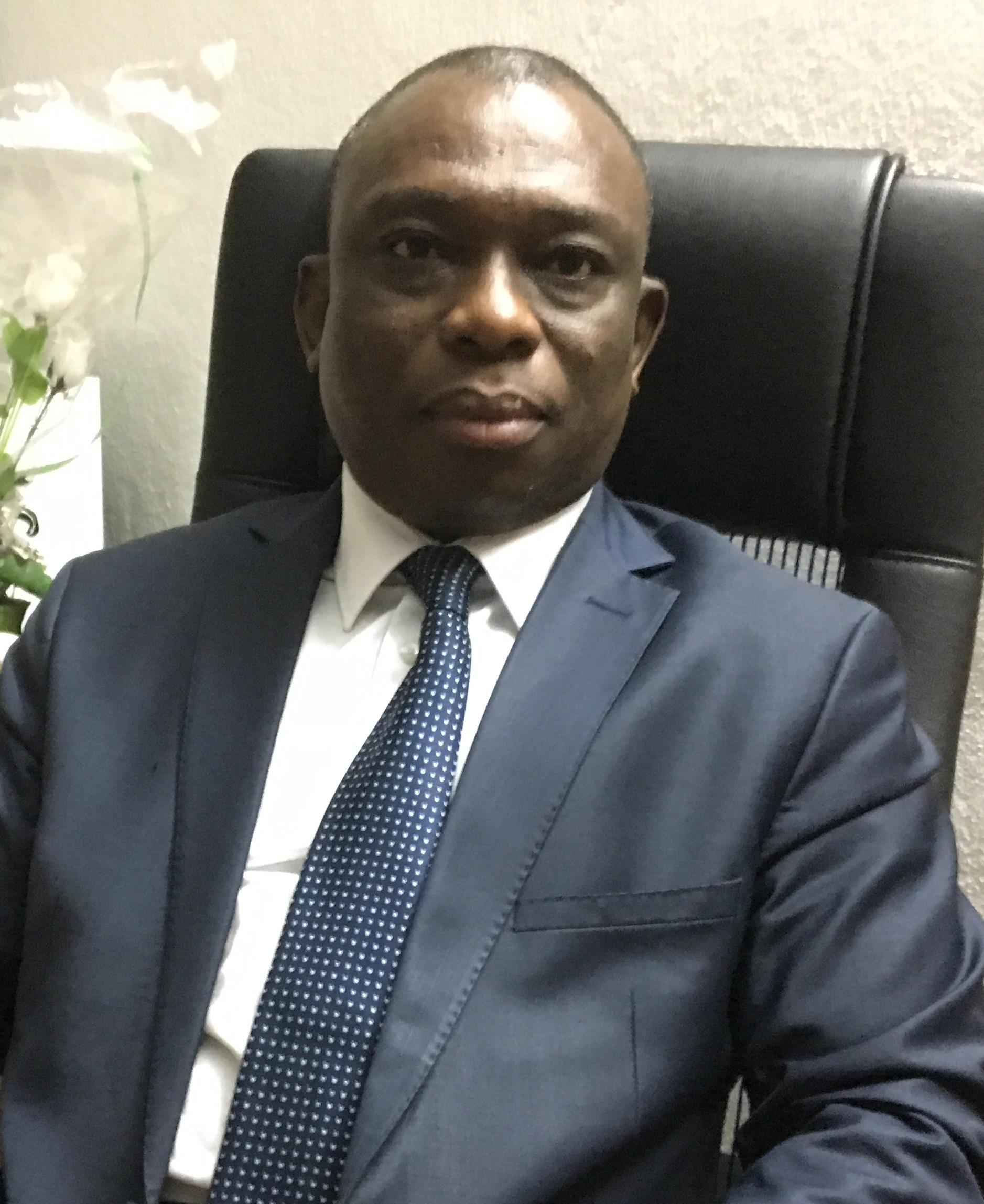
Nominee	Alassane Ouattara	Kouadio Konan Bertin
Party	RHDP	Independent
Popular vote	3,031,483	64,011
Percentage	95.31%	2.01%
President before election
Alassane Ouattara
RDR
Elected President
Alassane Ouattara
RDR

Presidential elections were held in Ivory Coast on 31 October 2020. Incumbent president Alassane Ouattara was re-elected with 95% of the vote amidst an opposition boycott.

== Background ==
In January 2017 incumbent President Alassane Ouattara of the Rally of Houphouëtists for Democracy and Peace (RHDP) announced that he would not run again after being president for two terms (2010–2015 and 2015–2020). On 5 March 2020, he publicly reiterated his intent not to be candidate during an address to Congress. Ouattara imposed Prime Minister Amadou Gon Coulibaly as the RHDP candidate of the ruling party over other potential candidates, including Vice President Daniel Kablan Duncan, who later resigned. However, in May, Coulibaly was hospitalised for heart complications and had a stent fitted. He returned to Ivory Coast on 2 July, but died six days later after falling ill during a meeting of the Council of Ministers. The event left the RHDP without a candidate, and Ouattara considered putting forward Defense Minister Hamed Bakayoko, before renouncing due to alleged links to drug trafficking.

In late July 2020, Ouattara rescinded his initial decision and announced his candidacy for a third term. Ouattara argued that because a new constitution was promulgated after a constitutional referendum in 2016, the normal two-term limit for the presidency was effectively reset, allowing him to run for a third term. Opposition parties argued that the move was unconstitutional, and some protests ensued, but Ouattara was allowed to run again regardless by the Independent Electoral Commission and the Constitutional Court.

Despite seeing good economic growth, critics have argued that vast inequality remains, and that Ouattara was developing authoritarian tendencies. Despite opposition parties calling for a boycott, two of his opponents allowed their names to remain on the ballot (Kouadio Konan Bertin did not support the boycott).

== Electoral system ==
The President of Ivory Coast is elected for a five-year term using the two-round system. If no candidate receives a majority of the vote, a second round may be held.

== Candidates ==
Former Prime Minister Guillaume Soro, who was living in France, announced that he would contest the elections. However, on 29 April 2020 he was sentenced in absentia to 20 years in prison and given a $7.6 million (£6.1 million) fine. Soro's lawyers claimed this was an attempt to prevent him taking part in the election.

On 14 September, the Constitutional Council approved four candidates; Ouattara, former president Henri Konan Bédié from the PDCI, former prime minister Pascal Affi N'Guessan and Kouadio Konan Bertin, a dissident from the PDCI. Former president Laurent Gbagbo and former Prime Minister Guillaume Soro, both critics of incumbent Ouattara, were barred as they were facing criminal charges. The ruling led to violent protests.

== Conduct ==
The opposition announced that it would not recognise the validity of the election, saying it was "marred by many irregularities and a low turnout," and called for "the start of a civilian transition in order to create the conditions for a fair, transparent and inclusive election". However, several members of the opposition have had disagreements, with the PDCI, Guillaume Soro, Simone Gbagbo, and Pascal Affi N'Guessan saying that a transitional government should immediately be named, while the FPI party argued that it was too early to form one in the current environment, saying a civil disobedience movement needed to force Ouattara to negotiate in a legal manner. Several localities, including several in Yamoussoukro, had seen traffic prevented from reaching some neighborhoods, and that the entry points to the city were blocked by barricades. Election monitors from ECOWAS had to travel by helicopter to reach Abidjan due to difficulties entering the city. Opposition supporters attacked several motorcades of pro-government figures, in some cases shooting at them, or setting vehicles on fire. Several people were also killed in clashes in Toumodi, as well as Tiébissou. Indigo, an Ivorian NGO backed by the National Democratic Institute, estimated that 23% of polling stations were shuttered, and 6% had to close early before the counting process and announcement of results were completed.

== Results ==
Candidate	Party	Votes	%
Alassane Ouattara	Rally of Houphouëtists for Democracy and Peace	3,031,483	95.31
Kouadio Konan Bertin	Independent	64,011	2.01
Henri Konan Bédié	Democratic Party of Ivory Coast	53,330	1.68
Pascal Affi N'Guessan	Ivorian Popular Front	31,986	1.01
Total		3,180,810	100.00
Valid votes		3,180,810	97.28
Invalid votes		53,904	1.65
Blank votes		35,099	1.07
Total votes		3,269,813	100.00
Registered voters/turnout		6,066,441	53.90
Source: Independent Electoral Commission
