= 2016 Ivorian constitutional referendum =

- 30 October 2016
- Do you approve of the draft constitution proposed by the President of the Republic?

Results
Choice	Votes	%
Yes	2,480,287	93.42%
No	174,714	6.58%
Valid votes	2,655,001	99.12%
Invalid or blank votes	23,600	0.88%
Total votes	2,678,601	100.00%
Registered voters/turnout	6,313,758	42.42%

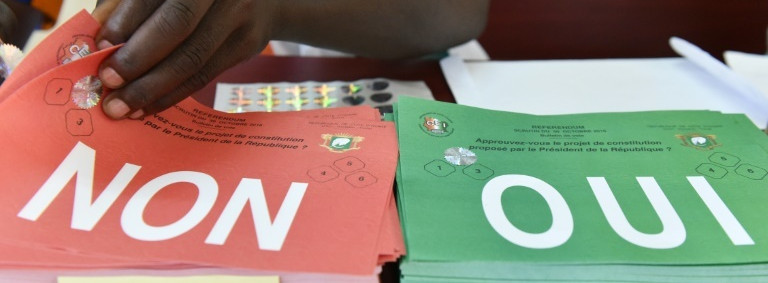
The actions of processing the referendums with options labed in the french language for "Oui" (Yes) and "Non" (No).

A constitutional referendum was held in Ivory Coast on 30 October 2016. Voters were asked whether they approve of a proposed new constitution. The new constitution would create a Senate, remove the nationality clause from the presidential requirements and establish the post of Vice-President. The constitution was approved by 93.42% of votes with a 42.42% turnout, as announced by the president of the Independent Electoral Commission (CEI).

== Background ==
The holding of the referendum was approved by the National Assembly on 22 July 2016 by a vote of 233 to 6 with seven abstentions.

== New constitution ==
The new constitution includes several changes to the current constitution, including the removal of a requirement for both parents of presidential candidates to be natural-born Ivorians and not to have had any other citizenship. It would also create the post of Vice-President and a Senate composed of former public servants. The President, Vice-President and two thirds of the Senate is to be elected at the same time as parliamentary elections, with the remaining third appointed by the president-elect.

There was speculation that President Alassane Ouattara would seek a third term in 2020, as the clause of the old constitution that required candidates to be younger than 75 years old was removed. He continued to promise that he would retire from politics in 2020, up to July 2020, when he announced his candidacy, arguing that his two previous terms did not count against the two-term term limit because of the change of constitution. He won the election with 94% of votes, amid an opposition boycott.

== Campaign ==
Campaigning for the referendum was held between 22 and 29 October. The proposed constitution was supported by the Rally of Houphouëtists for Democracy and Peace, an alliance composed of the Rally of the Republicans, the Democratic Party of Côte d'Ivoire, the Union for Democracy and Peace in Côte d'Ivoire, the Movement of the Forces of the Future and the Union for Ivory Coast, and some other parliamentary parties, including the Ivorian Workers' Party. It was opposed by a coalition of 23 parties headed by former president Laurent Gbagbo due to the lack of public consultation during the drafting process.

== Conduct ==
On polling day there was violence in pockets of Abidjan, where youth groups mainly from the opposition ransacked schools and several polling stations. The youth groups have been reported as being opposition members, who prevented people from voting in opposition strong holds. The interior minister Hamed Bakayoko declared that there was reported violence at over 100 polling stations in the city.

== Results ==
Choice	Votes	%
For	2,480,287	93.42
Against	174,714	6.58
Total	2,655,001	100.00
Valid votes	2,655,001	99.12
Invalid/blank votes	23,600	0.88
Total votes	2,678,601	100.00
Registered voters/turnout	6,313,758	42.42
Source: CEI

=== By region ===
Region	Turnout (%)	For (%)	Against (%)
Agnéby-Tiassa	44.34	79.88	20.12
Bafing	78.76	99.12	0.88
Bagoué	64.82	99.11	0.89
Bélier	37.51	92.36	7.64
Béré	73.58	99.24	0.76
Bounkani	52.93	96.59	3.41
Cavally	27.65	88.00	12.00
Folon	86.47	99.90	0.10
Gbêkê	35.80	89.03	10.97
Gbôklé	32.39	93.54	6.46
Gôh	21.26	94.12	5.88
Gontougo	51.28	93.37	6.63
Grands-Ponts	17.92	86.19	13.81
Guémon	29.23	93.09	6.91
Hambol	59.83	98.66	1.34
Haut-Sassandra	30.82	94.10	5.90
Iffou	38.66	94.38	5.65
Indénié-Djuablin	31.28	89.89	10.11
Kabadougou	86.51	99.86	0.14
La Mé	60.18	78.95	21.05
Lôh-Djiboua	25.15	93.36	6.64
Marahoué	28.48	92.68	7.32
Moronou	35.89	89.45	10.55
Nawa	33.70	94.93	5.07
N'Zi	27.18	88.70	11.30
Poro	86.58	99.57	0.43
San-Pédro	17.49	89.48	10.52
Sud-Comoé	30.88	91.87	8.13
Tchologo	68.79	99.27	0.73
Tonkpi	33.30	90.54	9.46
Worodougou	88.95	99.72	0.28
Autonomous Districts
Abidjan Autonomous District	46.25	93.89	6.11
Yamoussoukro Autonomous District	23.69	86.23	13.77
Ivorian diaspora
Belgium	10.63	82.40	17.6
Burkina Faso	10.59	82.41	17.59
France	5.18	94.36	5.64
Canada	4.62	77.46	22.54
Gabon	26.68	96.08	3.92
Guinea	54.10	93.17	6.83
Italy	13.11	89.37	10.63
Mali	12.55	85.89	14.11
Morocco	13.39	84.86	15.14
Senegal	8.73	78.64	21.36
South Africa	62.54	96.09	3.91
United Kingdom	7.64	95.27	4.73
United States	26.59	97.47	2.53
Total	42.42	93.42	6.58
Source: CEI
