= Jeannot Ahoussou-Kouadio =

Ivorian politician (born 1951)

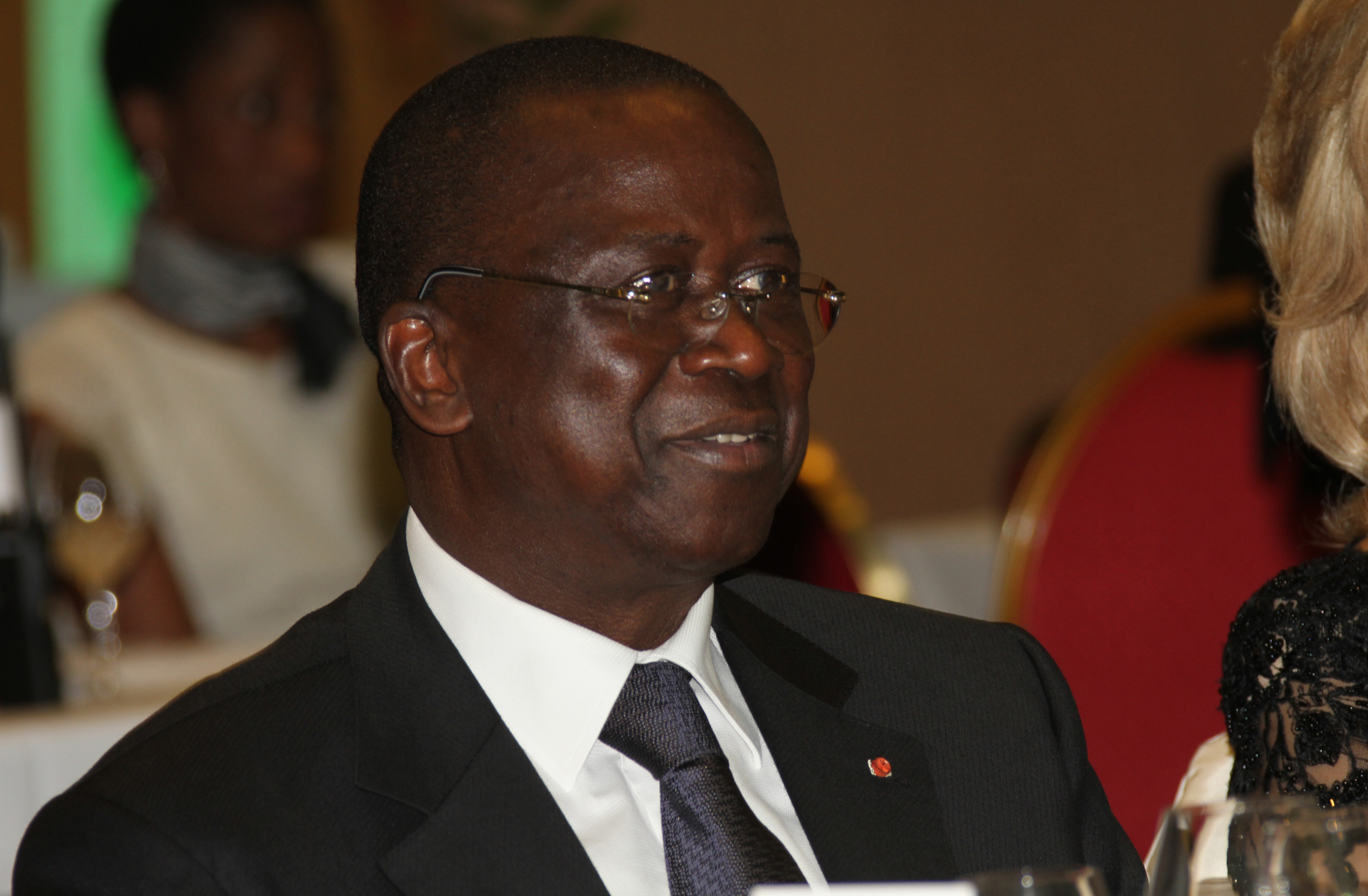

President of the Senate of Ivory Coast
- In office 12 April 2018 – 12 October 2023
- Preceded by: Position established
- Succeeded by: Kandia Camara

9th Prime Minister of Ivory Coast
- In office 13 March 2012 – 21 November 2012
- President: Alassane Ouattara
- Preceded by: Guillaume Soro
- Succeeded by: Daniel Kablan Duncan

Personal details
- Born: 6 March 1951 (age 75) Raviart, French West Africa (now Ivory Coast)
- Party: Democratic

Jeannot Ahoussou-Kouadio (born 6 March 1951) is an Ivorian politician who was Prime Minister of Ivory Coast from March 2012 to November 2012. In April 2018, he was appointed president of the Senate of Ivory Coast and served until October 2023. Previously he was Minister of Industry from 2002 to 2005 and Minister of Justice from 2010 to 2012.

Ahoussou-Kouadio is a member of the Democratic Party of Ivory Coast – African Democratic Rally (PDCI–RDA), a party led by former president Henri Konan Bédié. Since leaving office as prime minister, he has served as president of the Regional Council of Bélier Region and as Minister of State at the Presidency for Political Dialogue and Relations with the Institutions. When the new position as president of the Senate was created in 2018, Ahoussou-Kouadio was appointed to fill it.

== Career ==
Ahoussou-Kouadio was born at Raviart, located in the Tie-N'Diekro subprefecture. A business lawyer by profession, he is a long-time member of the PDCI-RDA and has held various party posts. He was appointed a member of the Economic and Social Council of Ivory Coast in 1999, and he was elected to the National Assembly of Ivory Coast in the December 2000 parliamentary election, representing the constituency of Didievi and Tie-N'Diekro. At the PDCI-RDA's 11th congress, held in 2002, he was designated as its Deputy Secretary-General for Legal Affairs.

Under President Laurent Gbagbo, Ahoussou-Kouadio was appointed Minister of Industry and the Promotion of the Private Sector on 5 August 2002 as part of a national unity government. He remained in that post until December 2005. He was the director of Bédié's campaign during the first round of the October–November 2010 presidential election; after Bédié placed third and gave his support to Alassane Ouattara, Ahoussou-Kouadio served as deputy director of Ouattara's campaign for the second round. Both Gbagbo and Ouattara claimed victory in the second round; Ouattara proclaimed himself president and appointed Ahoussou-Kouadio as Minister of State for Justice and Human Rights on 5 December 2010.

Ahoussou-Kouadio was appointed prime minister by President Ouattara on 13 March 2012, fulfilling Ouattara's promise to appoint a member of Bédié's party as prime minister. As prime minister, he retained the justice portfolio. However, he remained in office for less than a year; on 21 November 2012, President Ouattara appointed Foreign Minister Daniel Kablan Duncan, also a member of the PDCI, to replace Ahoussou-Kouadio. Ahoussou-Kouadio was subsequently appointed Minister of State at the Presidency on 9 January 2013.

Ahoussou-Kouadio has been the president of the Regional Council of Bélier since 2013. In the government appointed on 12 January 2016, he held the post of Minister of State at the Presidency for Political Dialogue and Relations with the Institutions. He became the first president of the Senate on 10 April 2018.

Having travelled to Europe on 3 July 2020 for a routine health check, Ahoussou-Kouadio tested positive for COVID-19 in Germany on 12 July 2020.

He was not re-elected to the Senate in the September 2023 elections.

Political offices
Preceded by Guillaume Soro	Prime Minister of the Ivory Coast; 2012	Succeeded by Daniel Kablan Duncan
