= Kondokro-Djassanou =

- Village
- Location in Ivory Coast
- Coordinates: 6°59′N 4°50′W
- Country: Ivory Coast
- District: Lacs
- Region: Bélier
- Department: Didiévi
- Sub-prefecture: Didiévi
- Time zone: UTC+0 (GMT)

Kondokro-Djassanou is a village in central Ivory Coast. It is in the sub-prefecture of Didiévi, Didiévi Department, Bélier Region, Lacs District.

Kondokro-Djassanou was a commune until March 2012, when it became one of 1,126 communes nationwide that were abolished.
