= N'Doukahakro =

- Village
- Location in Ivory Coast
- Coordinates: 6°40′N 5°9′W
- Country: Ivory Coast
- District: Lacs
- Region: Bélier
- Department: Toumodi
- Sub-prefecture: Toumodi
- Time zone: UTC+0 (GMT)

N'Doukahakro is a village in central Ivory Coast. It is in the sub-prefecture of Toumodi, Toumodi Department, Bélier Region, Lacs District.

N'Doukahakro was a commune until March 2012, when it became one of 1,126 communes nationwide that were abolished.
