= N'Gattadolikro =

- Village
- Location in Ivory Coast
- Coordinates: 7°14′N 5°8′W
- Country: Ivory Coast
- District: Lacs
- Region: Bélier
- Department: Tiébissou
- Sub-prefecture: Tiébissou
- Time zone: UTC+0 (GMT)

N'Gattadolikro is a village in central Ivory Coast. It is in the sub-prefecture of Tiébissou, Tiébissou Department, Bélier Region, Lacs District.

N'Gattadolikro was a commune until March 2012, when it became one of 1,126 communes nationwide that were abolished.
