= Konan-Kokorékro =

- Village
- Location in Ivory Coast
- Coordinates: 6°41′N 5°4′W
- Country: Ivory Coast
- District: Lacs
- Region: Bélier
- Department: Toumodi
- Sub-prefecture: Angoda
- Time zone: UTC+0 (GMT)

Konan-Kokorékro is a village in central Ivory Coast. It is in the sub-prefecture of Angoda, Toumodi Department, Bélier Region, Lacs District.

Konan-Kokorékro was a commune until March 2012, when it became one of 1,126 communes nationwide that were abolished.
