= Ahougnassou =

Ahougnassou Ahougnanssou
- Village
- Location in Ivory Coast
- Coordinates: 7°10′N 5°4′W
- Country: Ivory Coast
- District: Lacs
- Region: Bélier
- Department: Tiébissou
- Sub-prefecture: Tiébissou
- Time zone: UTC+0 (GMT)

Ahougnassou (also spelled Ahougnanssou) is a village in central Ivory Coast. It is in the sub-prefecture of Tiébissou, Tiébissou Department, Bélier Region, Lacs District.

Until 2012, Ahougnassou was in the commune of Ahougnassou-Alahou. In March 2012, Ahougnassou-Alahou became one of 1,126 communes nationwide that were abolished.
