= Gbangbossou =

- Village
- Location in Ivory Coast
- Coordinates: 7°32′N 4°49′W
- Country: Ivory Coast
- District: Lacs
- Region: Bélier
- Department: Didiévi
- Sub-prefecture: Tié-N'Diékro
- Time zone: UTC+0 (GMT)

Gbangbossou is a village in central Ivory Coast. It is in the sub-prefecture of Tié-N'Diékro, Didiévi Department, Bélier Region, Lacs District.

Until 2012, Gbangbossou was in the commune of N'Gban-Kassê with the nearby villages of Niénékro and Agbakro. In March 2012, N'Gban-Kassê became one of 1,126 communes nationwide that were abolished.
