= Yaakro =

- Village
- Location in Ivory Coast
- Coordinates: 7°26′N 5°1′W
- Country: Ivory Coast
- District: Lacs
- Region: Bélier
- Department: Didiévi
- Sub-prefecture: Molonou-Blé
- Time zone: UTC+0 (GMT)

Yaakro is a village in central Ivory Coast. It is in the sub-prefecture of Molonou-Blé, Didiévi Department, Bélier Region, Lacs District.

Yaakro was a commune until March 2012, when it became one of 1,126 communes nationwide that were abolished.
