= Bériaboukro =

- Village
- Location in Ivory Coast
- Coordinates: 6°23′N 5°18′W
- Country: Ivory Coast
- District: Lacs
- Region: Bélier
- Department: Toumodi
- Sub-prefecture: Kokumbo
- Time zone: UTC+0 (GMT)

Bériaboukro is a village in south-central Ivory Coast. It is in the sub-prefecture of Kokumbo, Toumodi Department, Bélier Region, Lacs District. The village sits on the east side of the river that forms the border with Gôh-Djiboua District.

Bériaboukro was a commune until March 2012, when it became one of 1,126 communes nationwide that were abolished.
