= Pranouan =

- Village
- Location in Ivory Coast
- Coordinates: 6°52′N 4°58′W
- Country: Ivory Coast
- District: Lacs
- Region: Bélier
- Department: Tiébissou
- Sub-prefecture: Yakpabo-Sakassou
- Time zone: UTC+0 (GMT)

Pranouan is a village in central Ivory Coast. It is in the sub-prefecture of Yakpabo-Sakassou, Tiébissou Department, Bélier Region, Lacs District.

Pranouan was a commune until March 2012, when it became one of 1,126 communes nationwide that were abolished.
