= Lomokankro =

- Town and sub-prefecture
- Location in Ivory Coast
- Coordinates: 7°5′N 5°2′W
- Country: Ivory Coast
- District: Lacs
- Region: Bélier
- Department: Tiébissou

Population (2014)
  - Total: 14,835
- Time zone: UTC+0 (GMT)

Lomokankro is a town and sub-prefecture in central Ivory Coast. It is a sub-prefecture of Tiébissou Department in Bélier Region, Lacs District.

Lomokankro was a commune until March 2012, when it became one of 1,126 communes nationwide that were abolished.

In 2014, the population of the sub-prefecture of Lomokankro was 14,835. The town has an area of 420 km^{2}. Lomokankro is 24km from Tiébissou and 17km from Didievi.

== Villages ==
The 23 villages of the sub-prefecture of Lomokankro and their population in 2014 are:

1. Aboblakro (614)
2. Amienkro (318)
3. Assé-N'gattakro (1,318)
4. Assoko Yao Djèkro (582)
5. Atchin Koffikro (450)
6. Bakro-Sakassou (418)
7. Bongobo (1,184)
8. Bouégbessou (996)
9. Bouékro (307)
10. Djahakro (283)
11. Gogokro (362)
12. Hodoukou (812)
13. Koffi N'gorankro (460)
14. Koua-Kouassikro (485)
15. Kouassi-Afflékro (226)
16. Kpassanou (831)
17. Kpodjou-Kpangbassou (204)
18. Lomokankro (1,282)
19. Lougbéli (653)
20. N'gangoro-Ahitou (846)
21. N'gatta-N'guessanblékro (397)
22. N'zissiessou (1,391)
23. Wawakro (416)
