= Subiakro =

- Village
- Location in Ivory Coast
- Coordinates: 6°42′N 5°16′W
- Country: Ivory Coast
- District: Yamoussoukro
- Department: Yamoussoukro
- Sub-prefecture: Yamoussoukro
- Time zone: UTC+0 (GMT)

Subiakro is a village in central Ivory Coast. It is in the sub-prefecture of Yamoussoukro in the Yamoussoukro Department of the Autonomous District of Yamoussoukro. It is located five kilometres south of the outskirts of the city of Yamoussoukro.

Subiakro was a commune until March 2012, when it became one of 1,126 communes nationwide that were abolished.
