= Zaetta =

Zaetta is a surname. Notable people with the surname include:

- Julia Zaetta (fl. 1985), Australian journalist and magazine editor
- Tania Zaetta (born 1970), Australian actress and television presenter

== See also ==
- Zatta
- Zetta-
