= Molonou =

- Town and sub-prefecture
- Location in Ivory Coast
- Coordinates: 7°8′N 5°25′W
- Country: Ivory Coast
- District: Lacs
- Region: Bélier
- Department: Tiébissou

Population (2014)
  - Total: 20,140
- Time zone: UTC+0 (GMT)

Molonou is a town in central Ivory Coast. It is a sub-prefecture of Tiébissou Department in Bélier Region, Lacs District. The town is on the east shore of Lake Kossou.

Molonou was a commune until March 2012, when it became one of 1,126 communes nationwide that were abolished.

In 2014, the population of the sub-prefecture of Molonou was 20,140.

== Villages ==
The 17 villages of the sub-prefecture of Molonou and their population in 2014 are:

1. Abé (759)
2. Abrika (192)
3. Aman-Salékro (4,585)
4. Amanzi (591)
5. Assuikro (1,413)
6. Do-Sakassou (985)
7. Grogro (868)
8. Koffi Agrokro (1,134)
9. Komorossou (1,240)
10. Konan Kuikro (598)
11. Konankro (997)
12. Kondrobo (678)
13. Molonou (2,709)
14. N'dénou (758)
15. Niamienkro (613)
16. Ya-Dibikro (1,677)
17. Yuakré (343)
