= Capital of Ivory Coast =

Capital of Ivory Coast may refer to:

- Yamoussoukro, the de jure capital
- Abidjan, the de facto capital
