= Kpouèbo =

- Town and sub-prefecture
- Location in Ivory Coast
- Coordinates: 6°20′N 4°51′W
- Country: Ivory Coast
- District: Lacs
- Region: Bélier
- Department: Toumodi

Population (2014)
  - Total: 25,473
- Time zone: UTC+0 (GMT)

Kpouèbo is a town in south-central Ivory Coast. It is a sub-prefecture of Toumodi Department in Bélier Region, Lacs District.

Kpouèbo was a commune until March 2012, when it became one of 1,126 communes nationwide that were abolished.

In 2014, the population of the sub-prefecture of Kpouèbo was 25,473.

== Villages ==
The 12 villages of the sub-prefecture of Kpouèbo and their population in 2014 are:

1. Adaou (2,842)
2. Akakro-N'gban (1,836)
3. Assakra (2,723)
4. Dida-Blé (1,791)
5. Dida-Kouadiokro (1,638)
6. Dida-N'glossou (816)
7. Dida-Yaokro (1,372)
8. Kalékoua (829)
9. Kpouèbo (5,176)
10. Moronou (4,642)
11. Oussou (852)
12. Zougoussi (956)
