= Lacs Region =

Coordinates: 6°50′N 5°10′W

Lacs Region Région des Lacs
- Defunct region of Ivory Coast
- 1997–2011
- Location of Lacs Region in Ivory Coast
- Capital: Yamoussoukro
- Area
- 8,875 km^{2} (3,427 sq mi)
- History
  - Established as a first-level subdivision: 1997
  - Disestablished: 2011
- Today part of: Yamoussoukro Autonomous District and Bélier Region

Lacs Region is a defunct region of Ivory Coast. From 1997 to 2011, it was a first-level subdivision region. The region's capital was Yamoussoukro and its area was 8,875 km^{2}. Since 2011, the area formerly encompassed by the region is the Autonomous District of Yamoussoukro and part of Lacs District.

== Administrative divisions ==
At the time of its dissolution, Lacs Region was divided into five departments: Attiégouakro, Didiévi, Tiébissou, Toumodi, and Yamoussoukro. Attiégouakro Department was created in 2009 and was therefore part of Lacs Region for only a short time.

== Abolition ==
Lacs Region was abolished as part of the 2011 administrative reorganisation of the subdivisions of Ivory Coast. The territories of the departments of Didiévi, Tiébissou, and Toumodi became the second-level Bélier Region in the new Lacs District. The territory of the remaining departments, Attiégouakro and Yamoussoukro, became the new Autonomous District of Yamoussoukro.
