= Zatta =

- Village
- Location in Ivory Coast
- Coordinates: 6°52′N 5°24′W
- Country: Ivory Coast
- District: Yamoussoukro
- Department: Yamoussoukro
- Sub-prefecture: Kossou
- Time zone: UTC+0 (GMT)

Zatta is a village in central Ivory Coast. It is in the sub-prefecture of Kossou, Yamoussoukro Department, Yamoussoukro Autonomous District.

Prior to the department being abolished in 2013, Zatta was in the Yamoussoukro Department. Zatta was a commune until March 2012, when it became one of 1,126 communes nationwide that were abolished.
