= Djékanou =

- Town, sub-prefecture, and commune
- Location in Ivory Coast
- Coordinates: 6°29′N 5°7′W
- Country: Ivory Coast
- District: Lacs
- Region: Bélier
- Department: Djékanou

Population (2014)
  - Total: 20,090
- Time zone: UTC+0 (GMT)

Djékanou is a town in central Ivory Coast. It is a sub-prefecture of and the seat of Djékanou Department in Bélier Region, Lacs District. Djékanou is also a commune.

In 2014, the population of the sub-prefecture of Djékanou was 20,090.

== Villages ==
The 14 villages of the sub-prefecture of Djékanou and their population in 2014 are:

1. Abouakakro 1 (1 312)
2. Assoikro (426)
3. Bringakro (1 676)
4. Djékanou (3 981)
5. Lalièkro (1 153)
6. Mougnan (2 153)
7. Tafissou (2 236)
8. Yaokouadiokro (527)
9. Yobouékro (703)
10. Alluiminankro (2 193)
11. Angbavia (1 046)
12. Gbohua (1 482)
13. N'da Kouassikro (826)
14. N'kloïdjo (376)

== People ==
- Sinaly Diomandé, Football player
