= Boli, Ivory Coast =

Boli Bollo
- Town and sub-prefecture
- Location in Ivory Coast
- Coordinates: 7°14′N 4°48′W
- Country: Ivory Coast
- District: Lacs
- Region: Bélier
- Department: Didiévi

Population (2014)
  - Total: 13,278
- Time zone: UTC+0 (GMT)

Boli (also known as Bollo) is a town in central Ivory Coast. It is a sub-prefecture of Didiévi Department in Bélier Region, Lacs District.

Boli was a commune until March 2012, when it became one of 1,126 communes nationwide that were abolished.

In 2014, the population of the sub-prefecture of Boli was 13,278.

== Villages ==
The eight villages of the sub-prefecture of Boli and their population in 2014 are:

1. Adjébo (624)
2. Aka-Kouamékro (1,476)
3. Allanikro (1,123)
4. Anokoi-Kouamékro (312)
5. Boli (7,241)
6. Grodiékro (1,622)
7. Labo (574)
8. Takikro (306)
