= Bonikro =

- Town and sub-prefecture
- Location in Ivory Coast
- Coordinates: 6°24′N 5°14′W
- Country: Ivory Coast
- District: Lacs
- Region: Bélier
- Department: Djékanou

Population (2014)
  - Total: 6,420
- Time zone: UTC+0 (GMT)

Bonikro is a town in central Ivory Coast. It is a sub-prefecture of Djékanou Department in Bélier Region, Lacs District. The town is on the north bank of the river that forms the border between the Lacs and Lagunes Districts.

Bonikro was a commune until March 2012, when it became one of 1,126 communes nationwide that were abolished.

In 2014, the population of the sub-prefecture of Bonikro was 6,420.

== Villages ==
The 4 villages of the sub-prefecture of Bonikro and their population in 2014 are:

1. Abouakro 2 - Groudji (1,556)
2. Assékouamékro (879)
3. Tollakro (1,319)
4. Bonikro (2,666)
