= Akissi Kouamé =

Ivorian army officer (1955–2022)

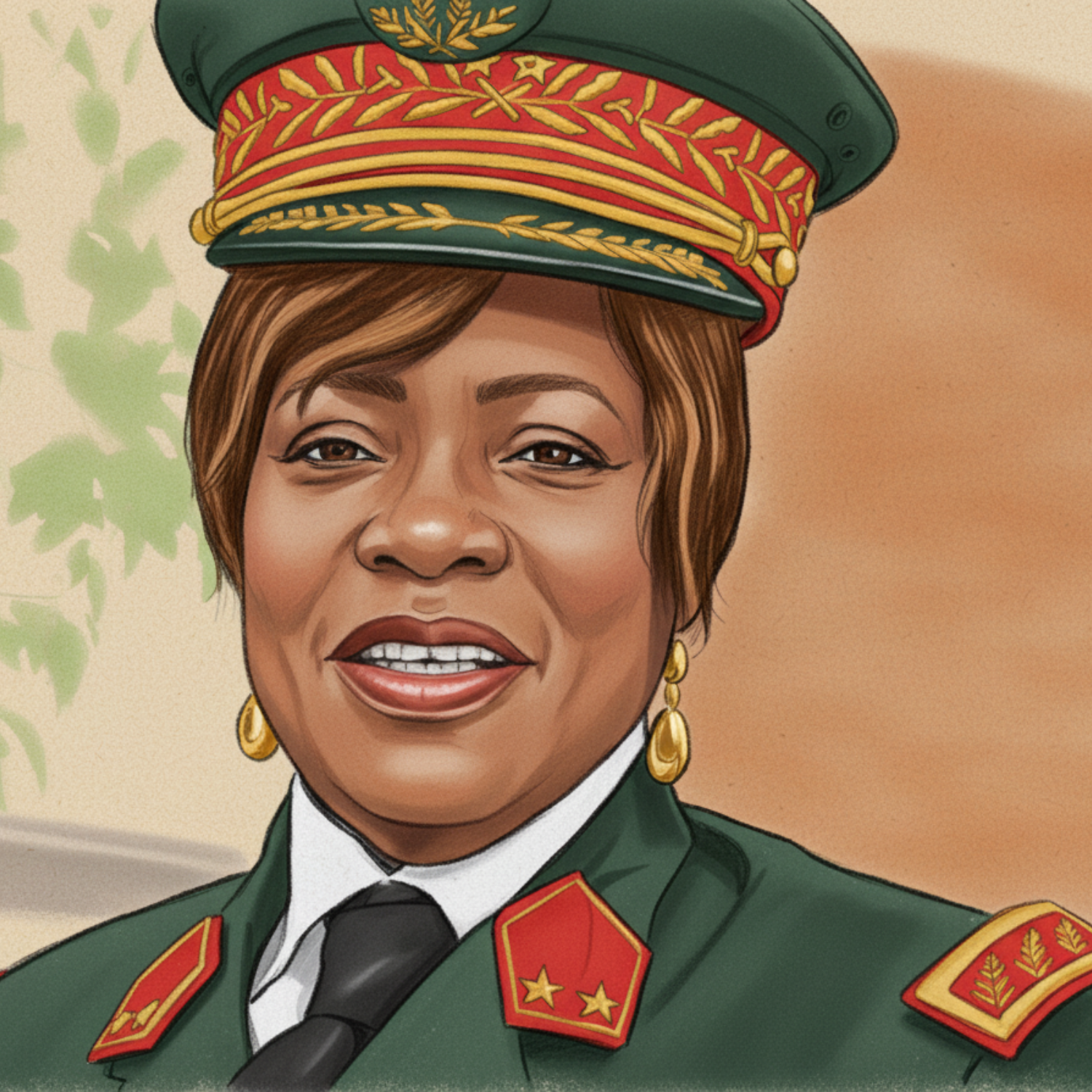
- Born: 1 January 1955; Singrobo, Tiassalé, Ivory Coast, French West Africa
- Died: 29 September 2022 (aged 67)
- Military career
- Allegiance: Ivory Coast
- Branch: Armed Forces of the Republic of Ivory Coast
- Service years: 1981–2017
- Rank: Brigadier general

Brigadier-General Akissi Kouamé (1 January 1955 – 29 September 2022) was an Ivorian army officer. She joined the army's medical service in 1981, whilst still a medical student. Kouamé became the first woman in the army to qualify as a paratrooper and in 2012 became its first female general.

== Early and personal life ==
Kouamé was born on 1 January 1955 in Singrobo, Tiassalé in the Ivory Coast, and was one of ten children. She was married to Lebahy Kouamé and has two children. Kouamé has served as president of the Ivorian Association of Senior Women Health Executives and of the Singrobo Mutual Development Association. She was a founding member of the Ivorian Women Leaders Network. She established the General Akissi Foundation to provide infrastructure in remote villages and support the education of women and children. Kouamé was in a customary marriage with Sylla Maciré by 2017 but split from him that year after he was arrested by police on fraud charges. Maciré committed suicide in February 2018.

== Military career ==
Kouamé was educated at home, at a school run by nuns, and at Sainte-Marie High School before studying medicine at the University of Abidjan. On 10 January 1981 – in her fifth year of medical school – she joined the Ivorian army and from July to September undertook basic training at the Armed Forces School in Bouaké. Kouamé was one of the first five female officers to join the army.

Kouamé achieved her doctorate in medicine on 23 June 1983 and thereafter attended the officer training academy until July, when she was appointed a lieutenant. In August she qualified as a paratrooper at the army camp in Akouédo, becoming the first woman in the army to achieve this. From 1983 to 1985 Kouamé served as deputy commander of one of the army's medical centres. Whilst holding this position she was promoted to the rank of captain on 1 September 1984.

In 1985, Kouamé was appointed head of the military's gynaecology and obstetrics department and studied for five years to achieve a certificate of competency in gynaecological ultrasound techniques at the University of Abidjan and in Brest, France. She attended a series of training courses in reproductive health and care in HIV/AIDS patients at the National Office for Family and Population in Tunisia in 1991, 1995 and 1998. On 1 July 1992, Kouamé was promoted to the rank of commandant (equivalent to major). She received training in health resources management for developing countries from the Université libre de Bruxelles in 1995. In 1996, she was trained in providing healthcare education and in social communication by the University of Liège and on 1 October was promoted to lieutenant-colonel and appointed coordinator of reproductive health in the armed forces. In this role, Kouamé initiated the appointment of midwives to the army health service. From 1997 to 1998, she was at the Center for Diagnosis and Research on AIDS at Abidjan.

From 1998 to 2000, Kouamé served as head of preventative medicine at the army's health service. From 2004 to 2012, she was head of the army's voluntary HIV screening centre and during this time was, on 1 April 2006, promoted to the rank of colonel, and on 2 August 2010 to senior colonel. On 18 January 2012, she was appointed director of health and social action in the armed forces, the first woman to hold this position. On 6 August 2012, Kouamé was promoted to the rank of brigadier-general by Ivorian President Alassane Ouattara, becoming the first female general officer in the history of the Ivorian army. In late 2012, she served as chair of the Pan-African Congress on Military Medicine.

== Retirement and death ==
Kouamé retired from the army in December 2017. Kouamé was honoured by the Commission nationale d'hommage aux doyens with a celebration of her life between 26 and 28 November 2021 in Abidjan and her home village of Assakra in Kpèbo. A film of her life was screened and an exhibition of photographs held during the event, which was attended by senior officers. Kouamé died in Abidjan on 29 September 2022, at the age of 67.

== See also ==
- University of Abidjan
- Paratrooper
- Military Medicine
