= Manzuma jocquei =

Scientific classification
- Kingdom: Animalia
- Phylum: Arthropoda
- Subphylum: Chelicerata
- Class: Arachnida
- Order: Araneae
- Infraorder: Araneomorphae
- Family: Salticidae
- Genus: Manzuma
- Species: M. jocquei

Binomial name
- Manzuma jocquei (Azarkina, Wesołowska & Russell-Smith, 2011)

Species of spider

Manzuma jocquei is a species of jumping spider in the genus Manzuma that lives in Central African Republic, Ivory Coast and Nigeria. Originally named Aelurillus jocquei, the spider was first described in 2011 by Wesołowska and Antony Russell-Smith. The spider is small, with a carapace between 1.5 and 2.1 mm (0.059 and 0.083 in) long and an abdomen between 1.3 and 2.3 mm (0.051 and 0.091 in) long. The carapace has a white stripe formed of scales which is more pronounced on the male. The male abdomen also has a stripe, but the female has two lines of white spots. The male has a thin embolus that is hidden by the hairy palpal bulb while the female has complex highly sclerotized copulatory ducts and a large pocket in the epigyne. These distinguish the species from other spiders in the genus, although the females are almost impossible to tell apart from some species like Manzuma lympha and Manzuma nigritibia.

== Taxonomy ==
Manzuma jocquei is a species of jumping spider. It was originally termed Aelurillus jocquei when it was first described by the arachnologists Wesołowska and Antony Russell-Smith in 2011. The species was named in honour of Rudy Jocqué. It was one of over 500 species identified by Wesolowska during her career. It was initially placed in the genus Aelurillus, first described by Eugène Simon in 1885. The genus name derives from the Greek word for cat. It was listed in the subtribe Aelurillina in the tribe Aelurillini, both named after the genus, by Wayne Maddison in 2015. These were allocated to the clade Saltafresia. In 2017, the genus was grouped with nine other genera of jumping spiders under the name Aelurillines.

In 2020, Galina Azarkina raised a new genus in the subtribe Aelurillina called Manzuma. The genus name was derived from her mother, Manzuma Mavlyut kyzy Azarkina, and the word manzuma in Ethiopian poetry, in honour of the home of the type species. The new genus differed from Aelurillus in the design of its copulatory organs. It is the only genus that is endemic to sub-Saharan Africa amongst the Aelurillines. Aelurillus jocquei was moved to the new genus and named Manzuma jocquei.

== Description ==
Manzuma jocquei is a small and delicate spider. The male has a brown carapace that ranges in length between 1.5 and 2 mm (0.059 and 0.079 in) and in width between 1.2 and 1.55 mm (0.047 and 0.061 in). It is generally covered in brown scales, except for two stripes of white scales on the top and additional white stripes on the sides. The eye field is a darker brown. The abdomen is dark brown and is between 1.3 and 1.75 mm (0.051 and 0.069 in) long and 1 and 1.3 mm (0.039 and 0.051 in) wide. It also has a white stripe on the top, but the undersides are grey-yellow. The chelicerae are brown and are dusted with white hairs. The spider has two small teeth on the front and one to the back. Longer white hairs cover the brown clypeus. The spinnerets are yellow at the front and brown at the back. The legs are also yellow and brown. The pedipalps are yellow with long white hairs. The palpal bulb is oval and the embolus is thin, hidden within dense hairs.

The female is larger than the male. It has a carapace that measures 21 mm (0.83 in) in length and 1.8 mm (0.071 in) in width, while the abdomen is 2.3 mm (0.091 in) long and 1.8 mm (0.071 in) wide. The carapace is lighter, with white scales rather than brown, and so the stripes are harder to see. The abdomen is the same colour as the male, but has two lines of white spots rather than a white stripe. The chelicerae and clypeus have more yellow in their brown colouring, while the legs and spinnerets are completely yellow the same as the pedipalps. The epigyne is oval with a large pocket and gonopores in the centre. The copulatory ducts are complex and highly sclerotized.

Manzuma jocquei is typical of the genus. The spider is particularly hard to differentiate from Manzuma lympha and Manzuma nigritibia. They can be identified by differences in the male copulatory organs, but the females are nearly indistinguishable. It is also similar to other Aelurillines. It differs from members of the genus Aelurillus by the lack of wings on the epigyne. The female is particularly similar to Aelurillus reconditus, differing in the larger pocket in the epigyne. The male can be confused with Rafalus lymphus but has a longer embolus and darker legs.

== Distribution and habitat ==
Manzuma jocquei has a species distribution that includes the Central African Republic, Ivory Coast and Nigeria. The female holotype was found near Ibadan, Nigeria, in 1973. Male paratypes were also identified at the same time in the same area. The spider was subsequently identified from samples that had been collected near Bambari in the Central African Republic in 1967. Examples have also been found in Ivory Coast, from near Kossou, Man in 1974, Lamto Scientific Reserve in 1975, and Bouaké and Gagnoa in 1994. The spider lives in forest areas and areas used for the cultivation of upland rice. Galina Azarkina notes that the example from Central African Republic may belong to a different species and so the species distribution may be more restricted.
