= Angoda =

Angoda may refer to:

- Angoda, Ivory Coast, a town in the Lacs District, Ivory Coast
- Angoda, Western Province, Sri Lanka, a village in Western Province, Sri Lanka
