= Manzuma kenyaensis =

Scientific classification
- Kingdom: Animalia
- Phylum: Arthropoda
- Subphylum: Chelicerata
- Class: Arachnida
- Order: Araneae
- Infraorder: Araneomorphae
- Family: Salticidae
- Genus: Manzuma
- Species: M. kenyaensis

Binomial name
- Manzuma kenyaensis (Dawidowicz & Wesołowska, 2016)

Species of jumping spider

Manzuma kenyaensis is a species of jumping spider in the genus Manzuma that is endemic in Kenya. It was allocated to the genus Langelurillus when it was first described in 2016 by Angelika Dawidowicz and Wanda Wesołowska but moved to its current genus in 2020 by Galina Azarkina It is named after the country where it was first identified. The spider is small, with an oval carapace that is between 1.8 and 2.8 mm (0.071 and 0.110 in) long and a spherical abdomen between 1.8 and 3 mm (0.12 in) long. The female is larger than the male. The spider is generally brown but has white lines and patches visible on its topsides. Its clypeus and cheeks, is generally brown and covered in long whitish-yellow or transparent hairs. The spider's legs are orangish-brown or brownish-yellow and have dark markings. The female copulatory organs include looping insemination ducts that lead to bean-shaped spermathecae. The male's pedipalps have luscious and iridescent brown to yellowish-brown bristles.

== Taxonomy ==
Manzuma kenyaensis is a species of jumping spider, a member of the family Salticidae. It was named Langelurillus kenyaensis when it was first described by the arachnologists Angelika Dawidowicz and Wanda Wesołowska in 2016. The spider was one of over 500 species identified by Wesołowska during her career. It was allocated it to the genus Langelurillus, which had been circumscribed by Maciej Próchniewicz in 1994. The genus is related to Aelurillus and Langona but the spiders are smaller and, unlike these genera and Phlegra, they lack the parallel stripes on the back of the body that is feature of the majority of these spiders.

In 2015, Wayne Maddison listed the genus in the subtribe Aelurillina, which also contains Aelurillus, Langona and Phlegra, in the tribe Aelurillini, within the subclade Saltafresia in the clade Salticoida. In 2016, Jerzy Prószyński placed the same genera in a group named Aelurillines based on the shape of the spiders' copulatory organs. In 2020, Galina Azarkina circumscribed a genus that she named Manzuma, in honour of her mother, Manzuma Mavlyut kyzy Azarkina, and the word "manzuma" in Ethiopian poetry. Manzuma is also a member of Aelurillina. She created the species Manzuma kenyaensis as a combinatio nova of Langelurillus kenyaensis, providing the first description of the male of the species at the same time.

== Description ==
Manzuma kenyaensis is a small spider with an oval cephalothorax and a spherical abdomen with blackish-brown and white hairs. The male has a brown carapace, the hard upper shell of the cephalothorax that measures between 1.8 and 2 mm (0.071 and 0.079 in) long and between 1.6 and 1.7 mm (0.063 and 0.067 in) wide. It is covered in brownish-white scales and has two stripes made up of white scales that runs from the front to the back. The sternum is yellowish-brown. Its eye field is dark brown and its sternum, or underside of the cephalothorax, is yellow-brown. It has yellow-brown chelicerae, while its mouthparts, including its labium and maxillae, are more brownish-yellow. Its face, including its clypeus and cheeks, is generally brown and covered in long whitish-yellow hairs.

The male's abdomen is dark brown on top and marked by a white stripe similar to the carapace, running from the front to the back. The underside is greyish-yellow. It measures between 1.8 and 1.9 mm (0.075 in) in length and between 1.5 mm (0.059 in) and 1.6 in width. Its book lung covers are also greyish-yellow. Its spinnerets are brownish-yellow, as is the majority of the spider's legs, although sections of them are brown. The leg hairs are long and whitish-yellow. Its pedipalps are yellow and also covered with long whitish-yellow hairs. Its patella, one of its joints, has luscious and iridescent brown to yellowish-brown bristles. Its cymbium is yellow. It has a bulobous palpal bulb that has a horn projecting from the top that points towards it thin and arching embolus. The palpal tibia is also bulbous, with a distinctive bulge to the side, and has a short spike, known as its tibial apophysis.

The female is hard to distinguish other members of the genus It has a brown carapace, which measures between 2.5 and 2.8 mm (0.098 and 0.110 in) in length and 2.1 and 2.3 mm (0.083 and 0.091 in) in width, that is covered in whitish scales and has a line that runs from the front to the back similar to the male. The eye field is dark brown and marked with a white line and white patches around the eyes themselves. Its clypeus and cheeks are brown and have long transparent white hairs. Its chelicerae are light brown with one very small tooth visible to the front and its labium is brownish with pale tips.

The female spider's abdomen is between 2.5 and 3 mm (0.12 in) long and between 2.1 and 2.7 mm (0.11 in) wide. It rounder than the carapace, nearly spherical. It is brown or blackish-grey on top and covered with dense grey hairs. Some specimen have a pattern of white stripes and spots on them. The underside is brownish-yellow and marked with lines of brown spots. The spider's spinnerets are long and yellow with dark ends and the short legs are orangish-brown or brown-yellow with large dark markings, brown hairs and brown spines. Its pedipalps are yellow-brown. Its epigyne, the external and most visible of its copulatory organs, is very small with a low pocket. The insemination ducts form a loop and lead to bean-shaped spermathecae, or receptacles, that show strong signs of sclerotization. Its accessory glands are very small.

== Distribution and habitat ==
Manzuma spiders live in sub-Saharan Africa. Manzuma kenyaensis is endemic to Kenya. The female holotype was discovered in 1965 on Mount Elgon. Other examples have been found in other areas of the country, often living in high places. The first male was found in Trans-Nzoia County in 1972. living at an altitude of 2,000 m (6,600 ft) above sea level. In 1974, a female was found by the road in West Pokot County. It has also been seen living near rivers and in plant litter on the floor of forests. One male example of the species, found in Elgeyo-Marakwet County in 1984, was found on a hill at the edge of a jungle at an altitude of 2,600 m (8,500 ft) above sea level.
