= Raviart =

- Town and sub-prefecture
- Location in Ivory Coast
- Coordinates: 7°24′N 4°53′W
- Country: Ivory Coast
- District: Lacs
- Region: Bélier Region
- Department: Didiévi

Population (2014)
  - Total: 17,113
- Time zone: UTC+0 (GMT)

Raviart is a town in central Ivory Coast. It is a sub-prefecture of Didiévi Department in Bélier Region, Lacs District.

Raviart was a commune until March 2012, when it became one of 1,126 communes nationwide that were abolished.

In 2014, the population of the sub-prefecture of Raviart was 17,113.

== Villages ==
The 12 villages of the sub-prefecture of Raviart and their population in 2014 are:

1. Agbakro (730)
2. Fithaissou (564)
3. Foufoue-Kouadiokro (575)
4. Gbangbossou (3,352)
5. Kouakoukro (195)
6. Kouassi Kongokro (874)
7. Manan-Yaokro (542)
8. N'da N'guessankro (884)
9. Angankoffikro (627)
10. Niénékro (2,145)
11. Raviart (6,047)
12. Sawa (578)
