= Kokumbo =

Kokumbo Kokoumba
- Town, sub-prefecture, and commune
- Location in Ivory Coast
- Coordinates: 6°33′N 5°16′W
- Country: Ivory Coast
- District: Lacs
- Region: Bélier
- Department: Toumodi

Population (2014)
  - Total: 24,650
- Time zone: UTC+0 (GMT)

Kokumbo (also spelled Kokoumba) is a town in central Ivory Coast. It is a sub-prefecture and commune of Toumodi Department in Bélier Region, Lacs District.

In 2014, the population of the sub-prefecture of Kokumbo was 24,650.

== Villages ==
The 19 villages of the sub-prefecture of Kokumbo and their population in 2014 are:

1. Kimoukro (3 004)
2. Kokoumbo (8 095)
3. Kplessou (1 205)
4. Makankouamékro (634)
5. Niamkey Konankro (1 231)
6. N'zabonou (211)
7. Pê-Kouassikro (349)
8. Ahouékro (1 098)
9. Assinzè (1 267)
10. Bériaboukro (1 198)
11. Gbogbobo (439)
12. Gbonti (798)
13. Kassékro (154)
14. Kondokro (233)
15. Langossou (633)
16. N'dakro (1 174)
17. N'guessanbakro (1 760)
18. Oko (395)
19. Sérémé (772)
