= Augustin Thiam =

Ivorian politician (born 1952)

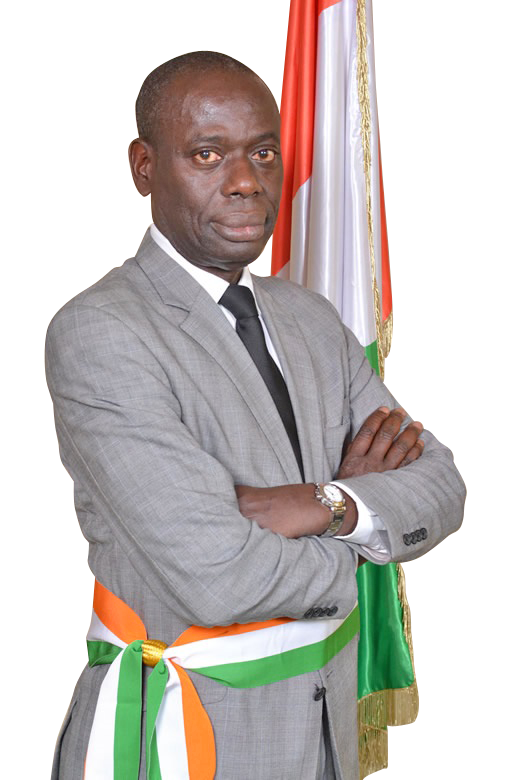
- Official photo of Thiam

Governor of Yamoussoukro
- Incumbent
- Assumed office 2011
- President: Alassane Ouattara

Personal details
- Born: 14 August 1952 (age 74)
- Party: Rally of the Republicans
- Education: Université de Cocody
- Occupation: Politician, doctor, journalist

Augustin Abdoulaye Thiam Houphouët (born 14 August 1952) is an Ivorian politician. Since 2011, he has been the governor of the Yamoussoukro Autonomous District.

When Thiam was young, his father was government minister and the ambassador to Morocco. Thiam is also the grandnephew of Félix Houphouët-Boigny, Ivory Coast's first president. Thiam was trained as a medical doctor at the Université de Cocody and worked in public hospitals until 1989. He moved to Paris where he worked as a journalist. He returned to Ivory Coast in 1993 after the death of Houphouët-Boigny.

In 1995, Thiam was appointed as the leader of the government's committee to combat illegal drug use.

In 2003, Thiam joined the Rally of the Republicans and began to oppose President Laurent Gbagbo. In 2010, he was the head of Alassane Ouattara's campaign for president in the Yamoussoukro area. In 2011, after Ouattara had won the election and succeeded Gbagbo, Thiam was appointed governor of the Yamoussoukro Autonomous District and was made member of the national cabinet. Thiam was appointed to a second term by Ouattara in 2015.
