= Yamoussoukro International Airport =

Airport in Yamoussoukro, Ivory Coast

Coordinates: 6.90317°N 5.36558°W

Yamoussoukro International Airport Aéroport international de Yamoussoukro
- Yamoussoukro Airport Terminal and Control Tower
- IATA: ASK; ICAO: DIYO

Summary
- Serves: Yamoussoukro
- Location: Côte d'Ivoire
- Elevation AMSL: 699 ft / 213 m
- Interactive map of Yamoussoukro International Airport

Runways
Direction	Length		Surface
Direction	ft	m	Surface
05/23	9,844	3,000	Asphalt
- Source: Google Maps

Yamoussoukro International Airport (French: Aéroport international de Yamoussoukro) is a regional airport serving Yamoussoukro in Côte d'Ivoire.

On November 6, 2004, Yamoussoukro Airport was attacked by French infantry after military aircraft from the airport bombed a UN peacekeeper base as well as rebel targets, 9 French peacekeepers and one U.S. civilian were killed. Two Ivory Coast Sukhoi Su-25 aircraft and several Mil Mi-24 helicopters were destroyed, which was most of the country's air forces. Mobs and rebels tried to attack the French forces after the airport raid.
