= Yamoussou =

Ivoirian sovereign

Queen Nana Yaa N'So (died 1909), also known as Yamoussou or Yamusa, was the Akouè (Note: A subgroup of the Akan people.) ruler of the village of N'Gokro during the early 20th century. In 1910, N'Gokro was renamed Yamoussoukro in her honour, and from 1983 has served as the capital of the Ivory Coast.

== Rule ==
Yamoussou was the niece of previous ruler Kouassi N'Go (after whom N'Gokro was originally named), and became the ruler of the village following his death.

During the French colonial era in the early 20th century, tensions between colonial administrators and the Akouè people were high. These tensions reached a peak in 1909, when Chief Aka Bla of Djamalabo ordered the French command post in Bonzi, on the road from N'Gokro to Bouaflé, destroyed. Queen Yamoussou intervened in the conflict to save Simon Maurice, head of the colony, and in return Maurice established a new command post in N'Gokro.

== Death and legacy ==
Queen Yamoussou died in 1909, and N'Gokro was renamed to Yamoussoukro in her honour the next year, with the suffix -kro meaning "town" or "house" in the Baoule language.

Her nephew, Félix Houphouët-Boigny, was the first president of Côte d'Ivoire post-independence, and was born in Yamoussoukro. In 1983, Houphouët-Boigny established the city as the nation's capital.
