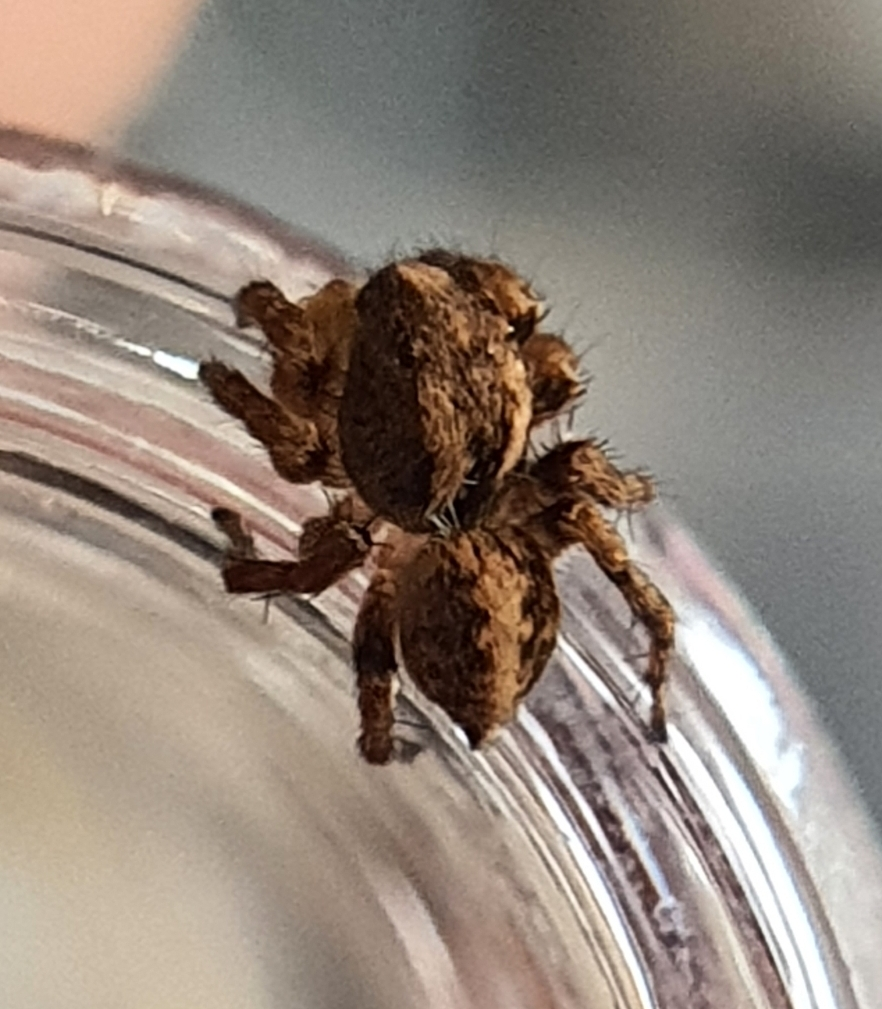
- M. petroae
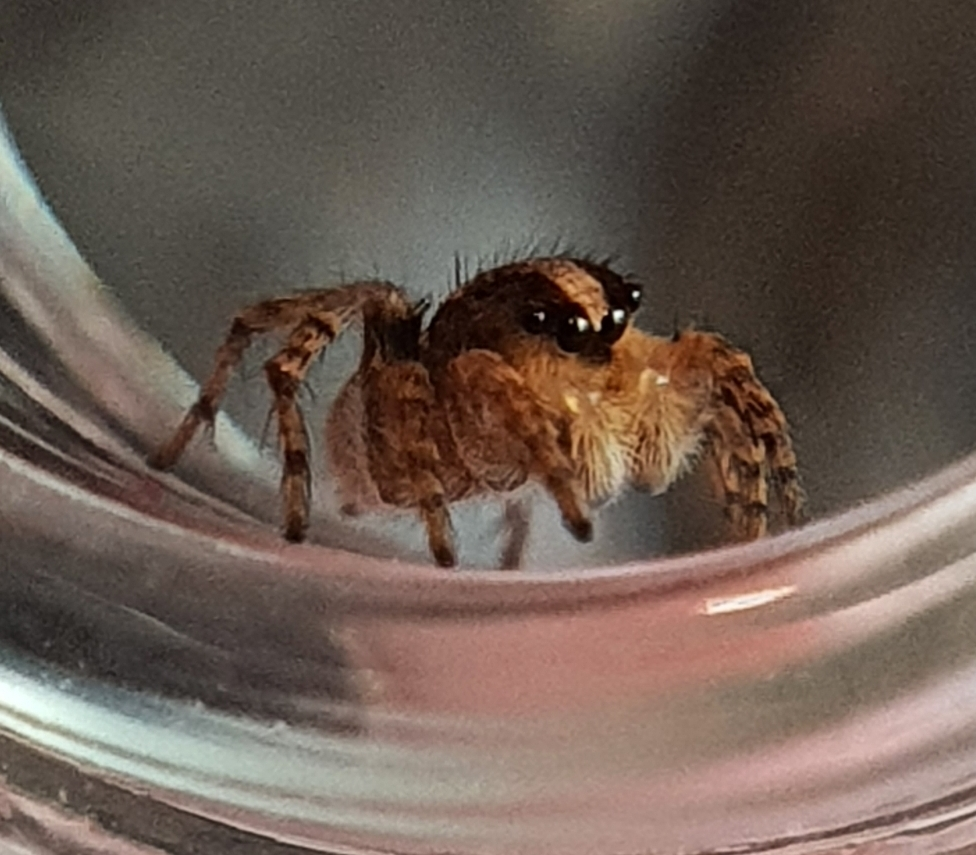
- M. petroae

Scientific classification
- Kingdom: Animalia
- Phylum: Arthropoda
- Subphylum: Chelicerata
- Class: Arachnida
- Order: Araneae
- Infraorder: Araneomorphae
- Family: Salticidae
- Subfamily: Salticinae
- Genus: Manzuma; Azarkina, 2020

Type species
- Saitis nigritibiis (Caporiacco, 1941)

Species
- 7, see text

= Manzuma =

Genus of jumping spiders

Manzuma is a genus of African jumping spiders erected by Galina N. Azarkina in 2020 as part of a study of genera placed in the subtribe Aelurillina. During the study, she found that several species formerly placed in Rafalus, Aelurillus and Langelurillus were similar and distinct enough from the type species of these genera. Accordingly, she erected a new genus, transferring four species in addition to describing three new ones.

== Species ==
As of October 2025, this genus includes seven species:

- Manzuma botswana Azarkina, 2020 – Botswana, South Africa
- Manzuma jocquei (Azarkina, Wesołowska & Russell-Smith, 2011) – Ivory Coast, Nigeria, Central African Rep.
- Manzuma kenyaensis (Dawidowicz & Wesołowska, 2016) – Kenya
- Manzuma lymphus (Próchniewicz & Hęciak, 1994) – Kenya
- Manzuma nigritibiis (Caporiacco, 1941) – Ethiopia, Yemen (type species)
- Manzuma petroae Azarkina, 2020 – South Africa
- Manzuma tanzanica Azarkina, 2020 – Tanzania

== See also ==
- Aelurillus
- Rafalus
- Saitis
- List of Salticidae genera
