= Institut National Polytechnique Félix Houphouët-Boigny =

Public polytechnic in Yamoussoukro, Ivory Coast

Coordinates: 6.864852°N 5.238558°W

Félix Houphouët-Boigny National Polytechnic Institute
- Institut National Polytechnique Félix Houphouët-Boigny
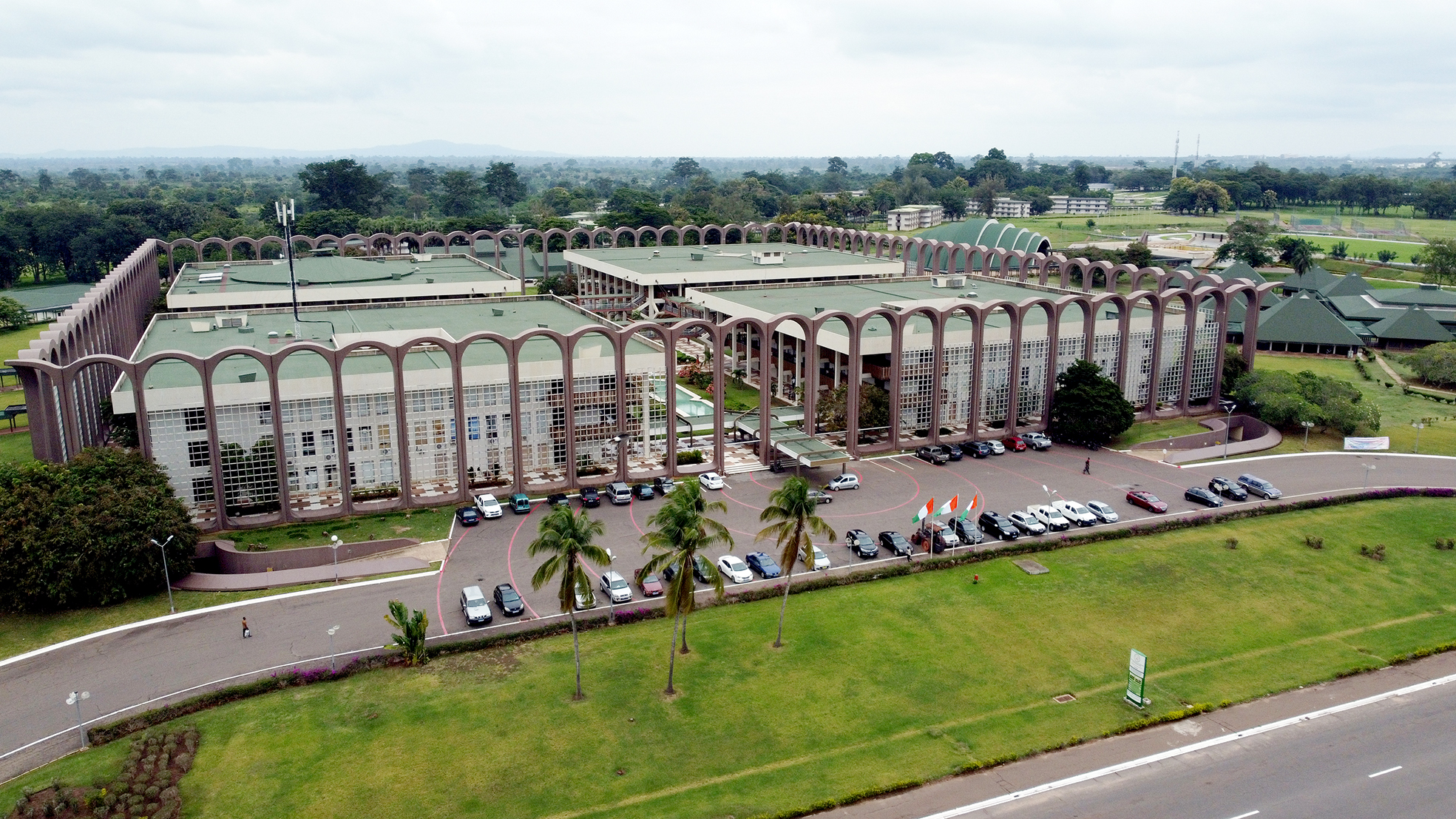
- Other names: INP-HB
- Type: Public
- Established: 1996
- Students: 3000
- Location: Yamoussoukro, Côte d'Ivoire
- Website: inphb.ci

The Institut National Polytechnique Félix Houphouët-Boigny (INP-HB) is a public polytechnic institute of higher education, research and production in Yamoussoukro in Côte d'Ivoire.

It is named after Félix Houphouët-Boigny, the country's first president.

== Components ==
The institute consists of these écoles supérieures (schools for higher learning / advanced training):

- École Supérieure d’Agronomie (ESA, ‘School for Advanced Training in Agronomy’).
- École Supérieure d’Industrie (ESI, ‘Industry’): for computer science, mechanics and chemistry.
- École Supérieure de Commerce et d’Administration des Entreprises (ESCAE, ‘Business Studies and Management’): also for marketing and insurance.
- École Supérieure des Mines et de Géologie (ESM, ‘Mining and Geology’): also for petroleum extraction/processing, and water treatment.
- École Supérieure des Travaux Publics (ESTP, ‘Public Works’): for civil engineering.

In addition, there are the:

- École de Formation Continue et de Perfectionnement des Cadres (EFCPC, ‘Continuing Education and Management Development School’), and
- École doctorale polytechnique (EDP), a doctoral school

These are among the country's grandes écoles. In addition, there are classes préparatoires aux grandes écoles. There are also discipline-based departments that are connected to the schools.

== History ==
=== Founding ===
The institute is the result of the merger of the city's four grandes écoles (ex-grandes écoles de Yamoussoukro):

- École Nationale Supérieure des Travaux Publics (ENSTP, ‘National School for Advanced Training in Public Works’) (1962, (Note: Initial founding year in Abidjan. It was one of several schools that moved to Yamoussoukro.) 1979–1996).
- École Nationale Supérieure d’Agronomie (ENSA, ‘National School for Advanced Training in Agronomy’) (1965, 1989–1996).
- Institut Agricole de Bouaké (IAB, ‘Bouaké Institute of Agriculture’) (1977–1996). Despite the name, it had already moved from Bouaké to Yamoussoukro.
- Institut National Supérieur de l’Enseignement Technique (INSET, ‘National Advanced Technical Training Institute’) (1975, 1983–1996).

The successors of the agronomy and civil engineering schools have dropped the word "national" from their official names.

=== Subsequent developments ===
Since 2011, the Ivorian state has taken matters in hand by appointing a new INP-HB director-general, Koffi N'Guessan, to restore its credentials. This team has been taking steps to revitalize the institute. Debt-relief and development contracts, signed by France and some African states, allows INP-HB to obtain some support from France.

== Campuses ==
There are three founding campuses:

- South Campus (site Sud): originally the École Nationale Supérieure des Travaux Publics, now the civil engineering and mining schools. Dorms are on this campus.
- North Campus (site Nord): originally the Institut Agricole de Bouaké and École Nationale Supérieure d’Agronomie, now the agronomy, continuing education, and doctoral schools.
- Central Campus (site Centre): originally the Institut National Supérieur de l’Enseignement Technique, now the industry and business schools.

There is also a small satellite facility in Abidjan (antenne d’Abidjan), which has the Centre de Préparation aux Diplômes de l’Expertise Comptable (accounting training) and the Service de Promotion et de Relation avec les Entreprises (promotion; corporate relations).

== See also ==
- Université Félix Houphouët-Boigny: with the same namesake
