= Djékanou Department =

Coordinates: 6°29′N 5°7′W

Djékanou Department Département de Djékanou
- Department
- Location in Ivory Coast. Djékanou Department has retained the same boundaries since its creation in 2012.
- Country: Ivory Coast
- District: Lacs
- Region: Bélier
- 2012: Established via a division of Toumodi Dept
- Departmental seat: Djékanou

Government
  - Prefect: Aka Sonoh Juli Epsé Kablan

Area
  - Total: 473 km^{2} (183 sq mi)

Population (2021 census)
  - Total: 37,281
  - Density: 78.8/km^{2} (204/sq mi)
- Time zone: UTC+0 (GMT)

Djékanou Department is a department of Bélier Region in Lacs District, Ivory Coast. In 2021, its population was 37,281 and its seat is the settlement of Djékanou. The sub-prefectures of the department are Bonikro and Djékanou.

== History ==
Djékanou Department was created in 2012 by dividing Toumodi Department.
