= Yakpabo-Sakassou =

- Town and sub-prefecture
- Location in Ivory Coast
- Coordinates: 7°1′N 4°54′W
- Country: Ivory Coast
- District: Lacs
- Region: Bélier
- Department: Tiébissou

Population (2014)
  - Total: 12,220
- Time zone: UTC+0 (GMT)

Yakpabo-Sakassou is a town in central Ivory Coast. It is a sub-prefecture of Tiébissou Department in Bélier Region, Lacs District.

Yakpabo-Sakassou was a commune until March 2012, when it became one of 1,126 communes nationwide that were abolished.

In 2014, the population of the sub-prefecture of Yakpabo-Sakassou was 12,220.

== Villages ==
The 20 villages of the sub-prefecture of Yakpabo-Sakassou and their population in 2014 are:

1. Abigui (331)
2. Adikro (542)
3. Apangokro (493)
4. Assamoikro (478)
5. Assoko-N'guessankro (218)
6. Boniankro (1,174)
7. Galébo (922)
8. Kanango (767)
9. Konan-Kékérékro (840)
10. Kongokro (226)
11. Kossou (830)
12. Kouakou - N'gorankro (283)
13. Miné-Kouadiokro (323)
14. N'goimbo (901)
15. Ninkro (537)
16. Pranoi (877)
17. Yakpabo-Kpangbassou (421)
18. Yakpabo-Sakassou (1,127)
19. Yao Do Kouassikro (323)
20. Yobouébo (607)
