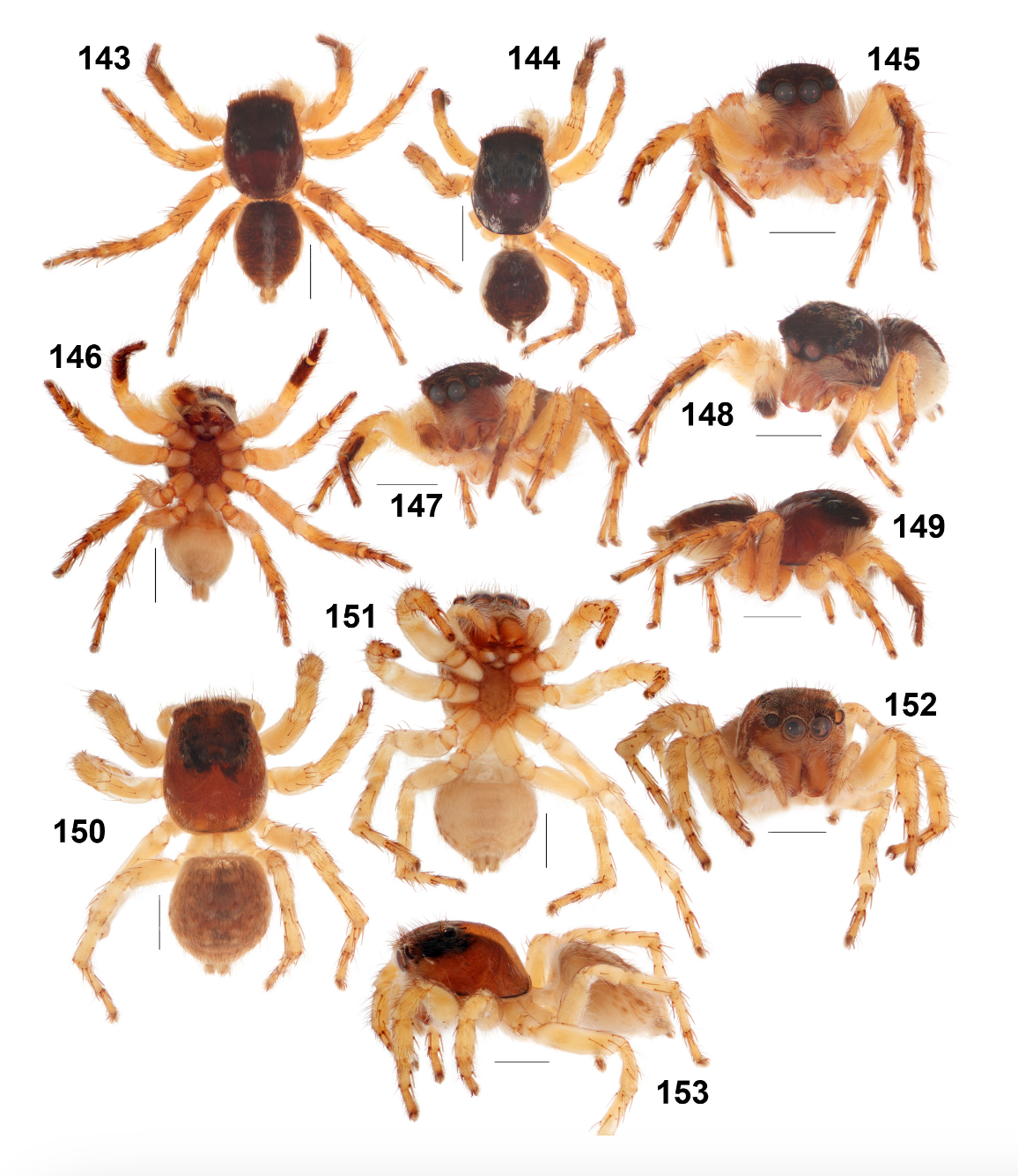
- Male and female specimen from Ethiopia and Yemen

Scientific classification
- Kingdom: Animalia
- Phylum: Arthropoda
- Subphylum: Chelicerata
- Class: Arachnida
- Order: Araneae
- Infraorder: Araneomorphae
- Family: Salticidae
- Genus: Manzuma
- Species: M. nigritibiis

Binomial name
- Manzuma nigritibiis (Caporiacco, 1941)

Synonyms
- List: Saitis nigritibiis Caporiacco, 1941; Aelurillus nigritibiis Prószyński, 1987; Aelurillus reconditus Wesołowska & van Harten, 1994; Rafalus nigritibiis Prószyński, 1999; Rafalus lymphus Wesołowska & van Harten, 2007; Manzuma nigritibia Azarkina, 2020

= Manzuma nigritibiis =

Species of jumping spider

Manzuma nigritibiis is a jumping spider that has been found in Ethiopia and Yemen. The spider lives near water, including the Awash River in Ethiopia and wadis of Yemen. It does not use its webs to catch insects but rather hunts by stalking and chasing, using its good eyesight to spot prey. It is a small spider, typically 3.3 mm (0.13 in) in length. The top of the forward section of the spider, or carapace, is brown and, on the male, is marked by two stripes of white scales. On the underside of the spider, the male has a light brown sternum, while the female's is brownish-yellow. Both have a dark brown eye field. It has a brown abdomen behind its carapace that is marked with a single stripe on male specimen. Its legs are yellow.

The spider is hard to tell apart from others in the genus. The female is particularly difficult to distinguish. The identifying feature for both sexes is the part of its face known as its clypeus, which is covered in long white-yellow hair and has a diamond-shaped brown patch in the middle. The spider was first described in 1941 with the name Saltis nigritibiis and was moved to the genera Aelurillus and Rafalus before being allocated as the type species for the genus Manzuma, serving as the defining species for the genus, in 2020.

== Taxonomy and etymology ==
Manzuma nigritibiis is a species of jumping spider, a member of the family Salticidae. It was originally termed Saltis nigritibiis when it was first described by the Italian arachnologist Ludovico di Caporiacco in 1941. The genus Saltis is derived from the Latin for "jump", while the specific name is related to the Latin words for black and pipes. The genus had been first circumscribed, defined so that it can be distinguished from other genera, in 1876 by French naturalist Eugène Simon. In 1987, Polish arachnologist Jerzy Prószyński moved the species to the genus Aelurillus. First circumscribed by Simon in 1884, Aelurillus derives from the Greek word for cat.

In 1999, Prószyński moved the species again, to Rafalus. This genus was named for the arachnologist Jan Rafalski. In 2020, Galina Azarkina identified that the species was sufficiently different from the majority of other members of Rafalus that it needed to be moved to a new genus. She named it Manzuma, which was derived from her mother, Manzuma Mavlyut kyzy Azarkina, and the word "manzuma" from Ethiopian poetry. Along with the newly named Mazuma lympha, the new genus also contained two other species, Aelurillus jocquei and Aelurillus reconditus and she noted that the specimens of the latter were identical to the new species Manzuma nigritibiis. Therefore, she combined the two by making Aelurillus reconditus a junior synonym of the new species.

The spider is the type species for the genus, defining the genus and serving as a reference point for classification. It is a member of the subtribe Aelurillina in the tribe Aelurillini. In 2015, these were allocated to the clade Saltafresia. The new genus differs from Aelurillus in the design of its copulatory organs. The species also shows some similarity with species in the genus Habrocestoides, particularly the circular structure that can be found to the rear of the female external copulatory organ, or epigyne.

== Description ==
Manzuma nigritibiis is a small spider with a typical body length of 3.3 mm (0.13 in). The spider has a brown forward section, called a cephalothorax, and, behind that, an abdomen with blackish-brown and white hairs. The male has a brown carapace, the hard upper part of its cephalothorax, that is typically 1.7 mm (0.067 in) long and 1.5 mm (0.059 in) wide. It is generally covered in brown scales, except for two stripes of white scales on the top and additional white stripes on the sides. Its eye field is a dark brown. The underside of its cephalothorax, known as its sternum, is light brown. Its mouthparts, including its chelicerae, labium and maxillae, are yellow-brown. The part of the spider's face known as its clypeus is also yellow-brown and marked with a diamond-shaped brown patch and a covering of long white-yellow hairs. It is the clypeus that most distinguishes the spider from others in the genus.

The male spider's abdomen is brown and is typically 1.6 mm (0.063 in) long and 1.3 mm (0.051 in) wide. It also has a white stripe on the top, while the undersides of its abdomen are brownish-yellow. Its book lung covers are also brownish-yellow as are its spinnerets. The legs are yellow. The legs are covered in spines. The pedipalps, sensory organs near the spider's face, are yellow with long white hairs. At the end of its copulatory pedipalp, it has a large cymbium that is a similar size to the palpal bulb, the latter being a more lumpy in form with a small tegulum. Its embolus is small and thin and projects from the top of its tegulum. Its palpal tibia has a short spike, known as a tibial apophysis.

The female is hard to distinguish from the related Mazuma jocquei and Mazuma lympha, differing in having an abdomen that is slightly narrower. It has a brown carapace, which measures 25 mm (0.98 in) in length and 1.9 mm (0.075 in) in width, is covered in whitish scales. Its eye field is dark brown and its sternum brownish-yellow. Although is chelicerae are brownish-yellow, its labium and maxillae are yellow, as are its clypeus and cheeks. Its clypeus and cheeks are covered in white-yellow hairs. There are two teeth to the front and one to the rear.

The female's abdomen has a brown top surface with a covering of yellowish-white hairs and a yellow-grey underside. Its book lungs, legs, pedipalps and spinnerets are all yellow. It has a rather flat epigyne with a low pocket in the middle flanked by two concealed copulatory openings. Its insemination ducts are relatively short and delicate, showing slight amounts of sclerotization. These lead to very sclerotized multi-chambered spermathecae, or receptacles. The spider also has long accessory glands.

== Distribution and behaviour ==
Manzuma nigritibiis has a species distribution that includes Ethiopia and Yemen. The first specimen to be identified, which became the holotype, or definitive example of the species, was a female found at the mouth of the Sagan River in Ethiopia in 1939. The first male was discovered in 1987 near the Awash River in the Awash National Park. The first specimen to be discovered in Yemen was found in 1991. A female, originally identified as Aelurillus reconditus, it was collected near Wadi Surdud in Al Mahwit Governorate. Other examples have also been found in the country. It is found in the Al Hudaydah Governorate. The species is ground-dwelling. It does not spin webs to catch prey, but rather stalks and chases, using its good eyesight as its primary sense to catch insects.
