= Kossou =

- Town and sub-prefecture
- Location in Ivory Coast
- Coordinates: 7°0′N 5°29′W
- Country: Ivory Coast
- District: Yamoussoukro
- Department: Yamoussoukro

Population (2014)
  - Total: 28,321
- Time zone: UTC+0 (GMT)

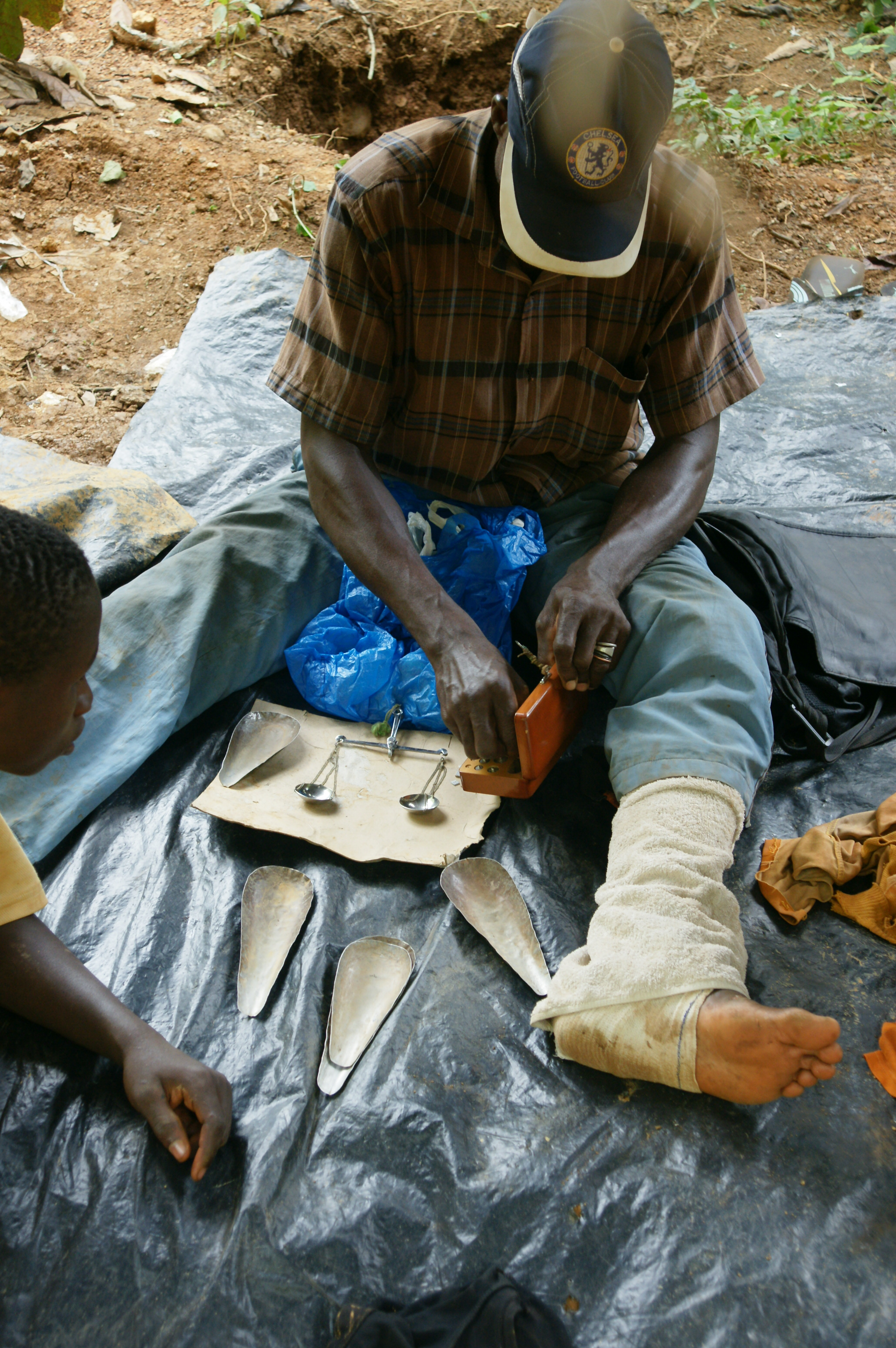
Man weighing gold collected in a mine near the dam

Kossou is a town in central Ivory Coast. Since 2013, it has been one of two sub-prefectures of Yamoussoukro Department, Yamoussoukro Autonomous District. The town is named after nearby Lake Kossou.

Kossou was a commune until March 2012, when it became one of 1,126 communes nationwide that were abolished.

Villages in the sub-prefecture include Zatta.
