= Angoda, Ivory Coast =

Angoda Angonda
- Town and sub-prefecture
- Location in Ivory Coast
- Coordinates: 6°41′N 5°2′W
- Country: Ivory Coast
- District: Lacs
- Region: Bélier
- Department: Toumodi

Population (2014)
  - Total: 14,272
- Time zone: UTC+0 (GMT)

Angoda (also spelled Angonda) is a town in central Ivory Coast. It is a sub-prefecture of Toumodi Department in Bélier Region, Lacs District.

Angoda was a commune until March 2012, when it became one of 1,126 communes nationwide that were abolished.

In 2014, the population of the sub-prefecture of Angoda was 14,272.

== Villages ==
The 11 villages of the sub-prefecture of Angoda and their population in 2014 are:

1. Angoda (3,011)
2. Assafou (815)
3. Djangoménou (780)
4. Gbakroukro (438)
5. Gbofia (1,030)
6. Kétékré-Bonikro (3,718)
7. Koffidjèkro (982)
8. Konan Kokorékro (1,718)
9. Lomo-Nord (698)
10. Mougokro (451)
11. N'guessankro (631)
