= Molonou-Blé =

- Town and sub-prefecture
- Location in Ivory Coast
- Coordinates: 7°24′N 4°59′W
- Country: Ivory Coast
- District: Lacs
- Region: Bélier
- Department: Didiévi

Population (2014)
  - Total: 23,348
- Time zone: UTC+0 (GMT)

Molonou-Blé is a town in central Ivory Coast. It is a sub-prefecture of Didiévi Department in Bélier Region, Lacs District.

Molonou-Blé was a commune until March 2012, when it became one of 1,126 communes nationwide that were abolished.

In 2014, the population of the sub-prefecture of Molonou-Blé was 23,348.

== Villages ==
The 36 villages of the sub-prefecture of Molonou-Blé and their population in 2014 are:

1. Aka-Diémélékro (519)
2. Akaffoukro (706)
3. Allialikro (576)
4. Assankro (501)
5. Assé-Blendoukro (554)
6. Assouakro (297)
7. Ayengrébo (755)
8. Bossi (295)
9. Boté-N'din (177)
10. Boungué (708)
11. Diamankro (186)
12. Golikro-Molonou (391)
13. Golikro-Srê (325)
14. Kokro-Kouassikro (798)
15. Konansuikro (745)
16. Kotoblinoi (200)
17. Kouadio-Gbankakro (632)
18. Kouamé-Akoikro (275)
19. Kpacobo-Konankro (1,006)
20. Kpolessou (1,072)
21. Krou-Okoukro (832)
22. Lékissou-Kaabo (429)
23. Lékissou (746)
24. Mafê (788)
25. M'bam (605)
26. Molonou-Blé (1,939)
27. N'drikro (778)
28. N'gom (1,951)
29. N'guessankro (629)
30. N'guyakro (1,253)
31. Okoubonou (509)
32. Sakri (315)
33. Sarakakro (556)
34. Somélakro (401)
35. Tahossou (377)
36. Yaakro (522)
