= Didiévi =

- Town, sub-prefecture, and commune
- Location in Ivory Coast
- Coordinates: 7°8′N 4°54′W
- Country: Ivory Coast
- District: Lacs
- Region: Bélier Region
- Department: Didiévi

Population (2014)
  - Total: 22,510
- Time zone: UTC+0 (GMT)

Didiévi is a town in central Ivory Coast. It is a sub-prefecture and the seat of the Didiévi Department in the Bélier Region of the Lacs District. Didiévi is also a commune.

In 2014, the population of the sub-prefecture of Didiévi was 22,510.

== Villages ==
The 27 villages of the Didiévi sub-prefecture and their populations in 2014 are:

1. Ahougnanou (428)
2. Allokokro (792)
3. Attien-Kouassikro (787)
4. Broukro-Totokro 1 (470)
5. Broukro-Totokro 2 (476)
6. Didiébou-Dioula (752)
7. Didiévi (7 917)
8. Kouakou-Koffikro (224)
9. Kouamé-Akaffoukro (950)
10. Koukoun-Zogrékro (121)
11. Kouassi-Kprékro (300)
12. Krayabo (603)
13. Langui-Kouadiokro (390)
14. N'da-Akissikro (1 110)
15. Anouazè-Okabo (850)
16. Attekro (590)
17. Bodo (Bondougou) (326)
18. Groyakro (380)
19. Kangrassou (701)
20. Kondrokro-Djassanou (1 073)
21. Kongouè-Kouadiokro (492)
22. Kouassi- N'guessankro (516)
23. N’grobo (669)
24. Polonou (568)
25. Tingan Okoukro (341)
26. Yalombi-Kouassikro (203)
27. Yoboua-Allanikro (481)
