= Tié-N'Diékro =

- Town, sub-prefecture, and commune
- Location in Ivory Coast
- Coordinates: 7°26′N 4°46′W
- Country: Ivory Coast
- District: Lacs
- Region: Bélier
- Department: Didiévi

Population (2014)
  - Total: 17,450
- Time zone: UTC+0 (GMT)

Tié-N'Diékro is a town in central Ivory Coast. It is a sub-prefecture and commune of Didiévi Department in Bélier Region, Lacs District.

In 2014, the population of the sub-prefecture of Tié-N'Diékro was 17,450.

== Villages ==
The 15 villages of the sub-prefecture of Tié-N'Diékro and their population in 2014 are:

1. Anougbré-Kouadiokro (314)
2. Attiégouakro (2 547)
3. Bendé-Tanoukro (757)
4. Djamankro (1 076)
5. Kongoli-Kouamékro (661)
6. Kouamé-Konankro (391)
7. Landonou (997)
8. N'djè (1 113)
9. Ouffouékro (501)
10. Salékro (732)
11. Tié-N'diékro (2 443)
12. Yao-Loukoukro (1 022)
13. Yobouéblessou (1 062)
14. Kpèbo (3 385)
15. Yao-Blékro (449)
