= Yamoussoukro Department =

Yamoussoukro Department Département de Yamoussoukro
- Department
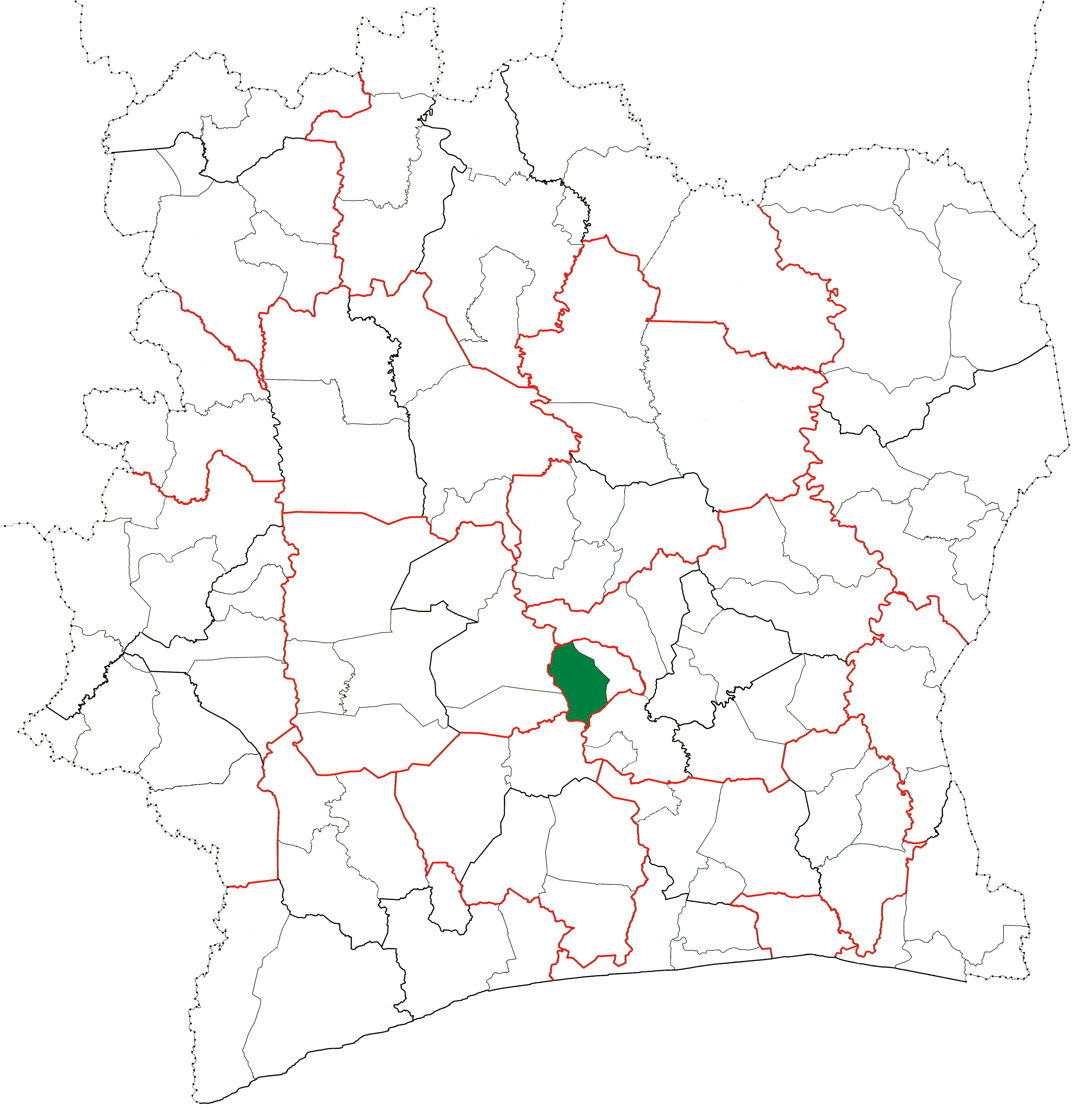
- Location in Ivory Coast. Yamoussoukro Department has had these boundaries since 2009.
- Country: Ivory Coast
- District: Yamoussoukro
- 1988: Established as a first-level subdivision via division of Bouaké Dept
- 1997: Converted to a second-level subdivision
- 1998: Divided to create Tiébissou Dept
- 2009: Divided to create Attiégouakro Dept
- 2011: Converted to a third-level subdivision
- 2011: Transferred from Lacs Region to Yamoussoukro Autonomous District
- Departmental seat: Yamoussoukro

Government
  - Prefect: André Ekponon Assomou

Area
  - Total: 1,270 km^{2} (490 sq mi)

Population (2021 census)
  - Total: 372,559
  - Density: 293/km^{2} (760/sq mi)
- Time zone: UTC+0 (GMT)

Yamoussoukro Department is a department of Ivory Coast. The department houses the political capital of Ivory Coast, Yamoussoukro, and is one of two departments in the Yamoussoukro Autonomous District.

== Population and sub-prefectures ==
In the 2014 census, Yamoussoukro Department had a population of 310,056. The department is divided into two sub-prefectures, Yamoussoukro and Kossou.

== History ==
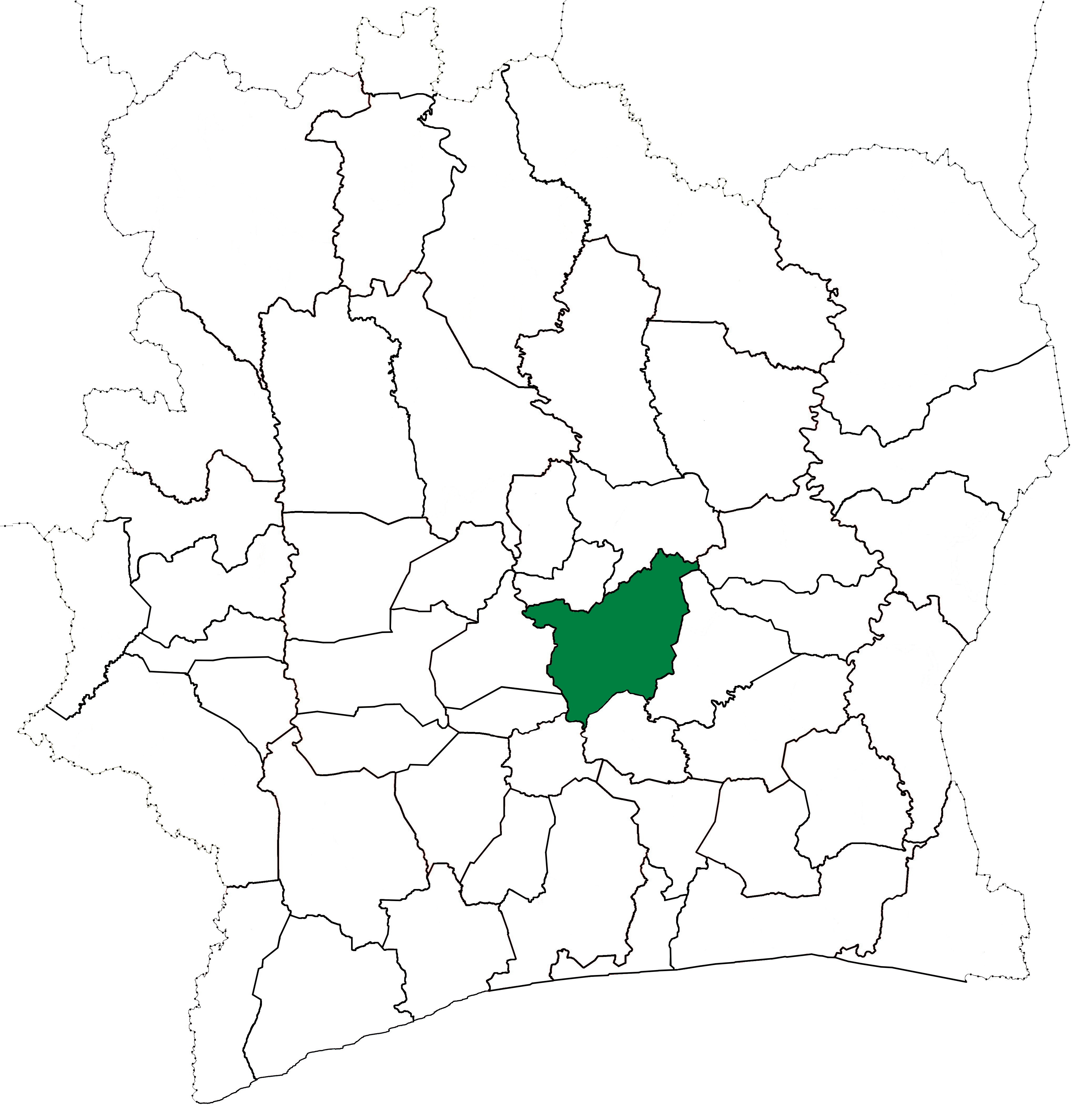
Yamoussoukro Department upon its creation in 1988. It kept these boundaries until 1998, but other subdivision boundary changes began to be made in 1995.

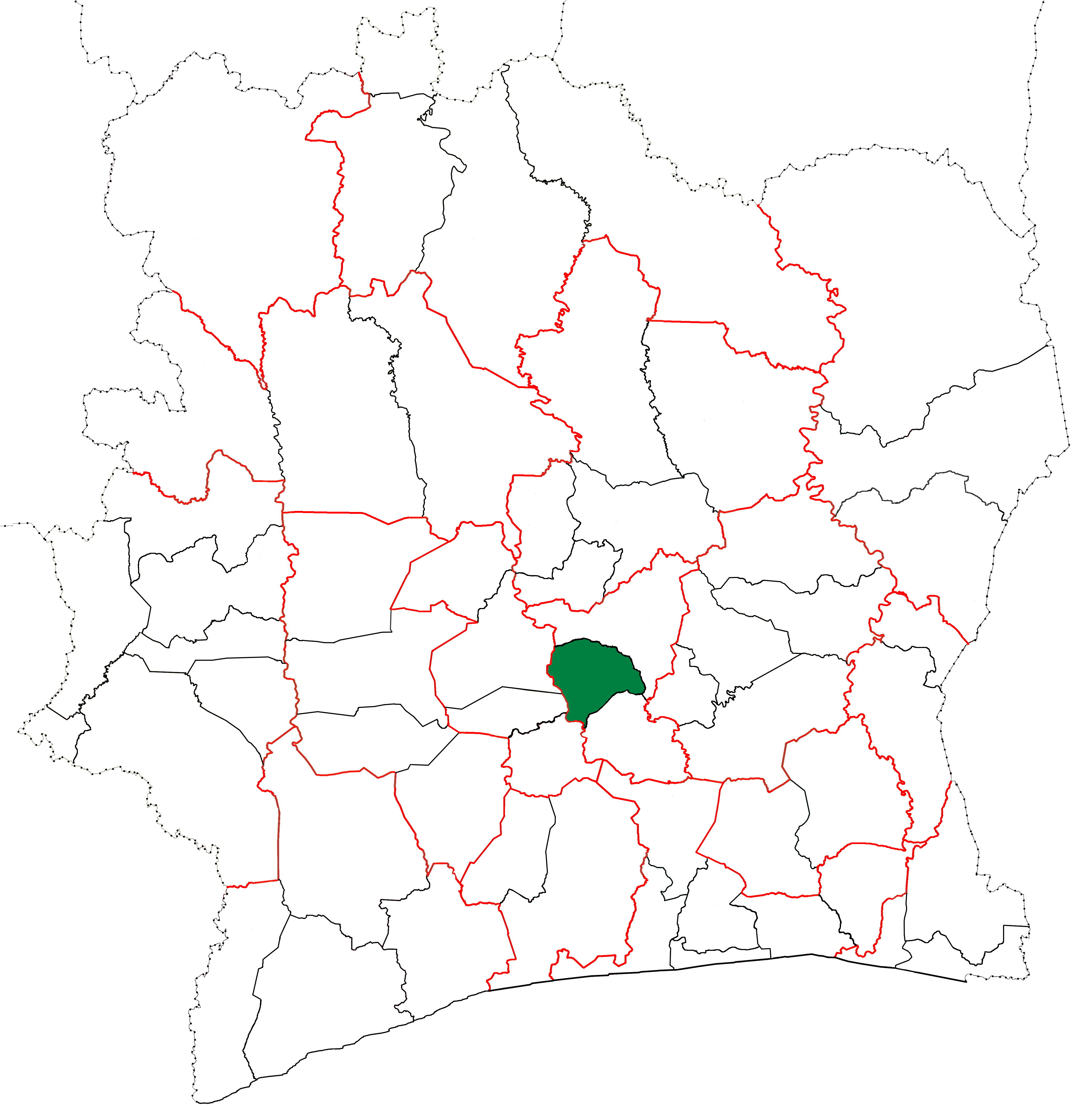
Yamoussoukro Department from 1998 until 2009. (Other subdivision boundaries changed beginning in 2000.)

Yamoussoukro Department was established in 1988 as first-level subdivision by dividing Bouaké Department. In 1997, regions were introduced as new first-level subdivisions of Ivory Coast; as a result, all departments were converted into second-level subdivisions. Yamoussoukro Department was included in Lacs Region.

In 1998, Yamoussoukro Department was divided in order to create Tiébissou Department. Yamoussoukro Department was divided again in 2009 to create Attiégouakro Department.

In 2011, districts were introduced as new first-level subdivisions of Ivory Coast. At the same time, regions were reorganised and became second-level subdivisions and all departments were converted into third-level subdivisions. At this time, Yamoussoukro Department became part of Yamoussoukro Autonomous District, one of two districts in the country with no regions.
