= Yamoussoukro =

Capital city of Ivory Coast

- Capital city
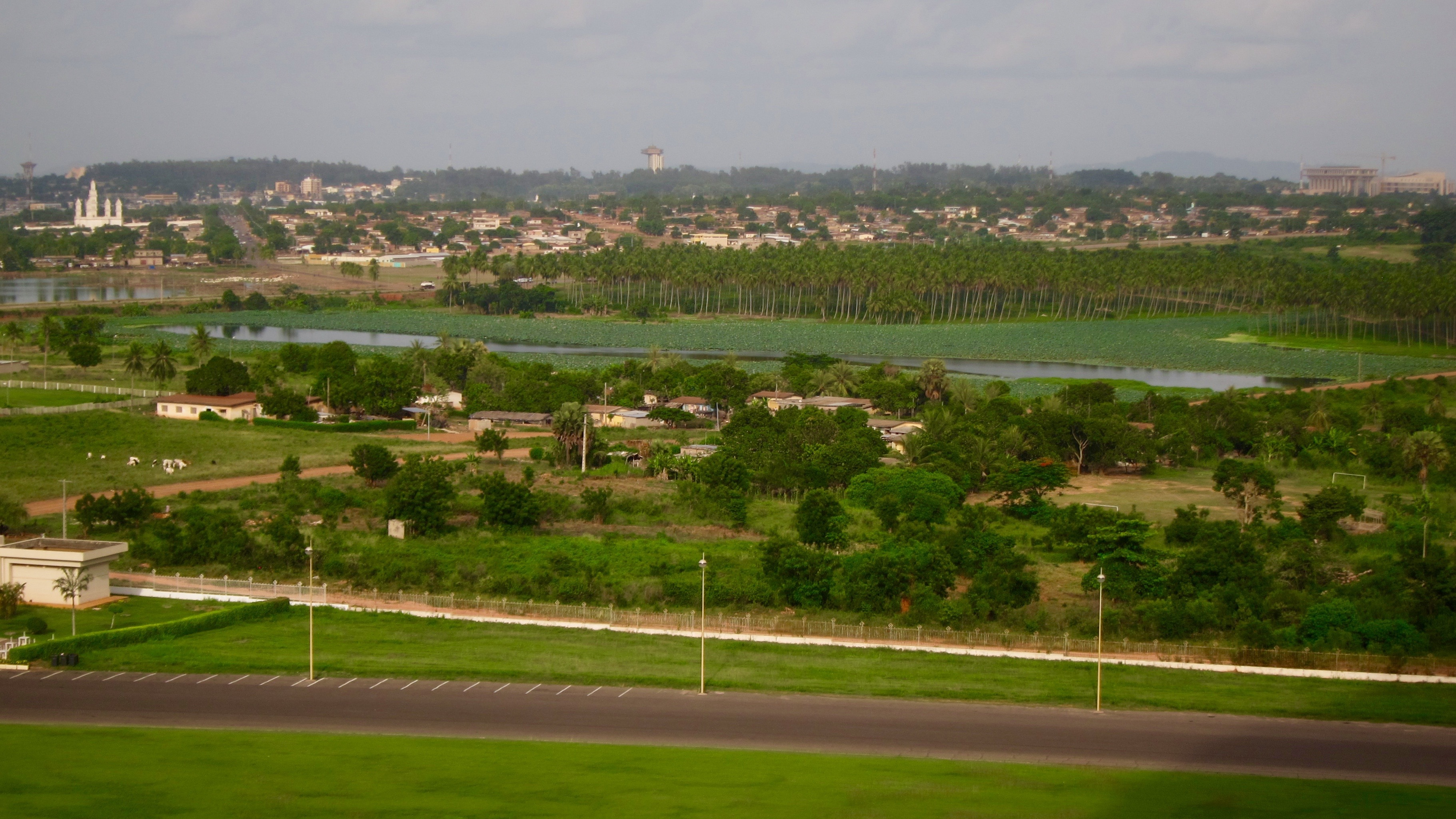
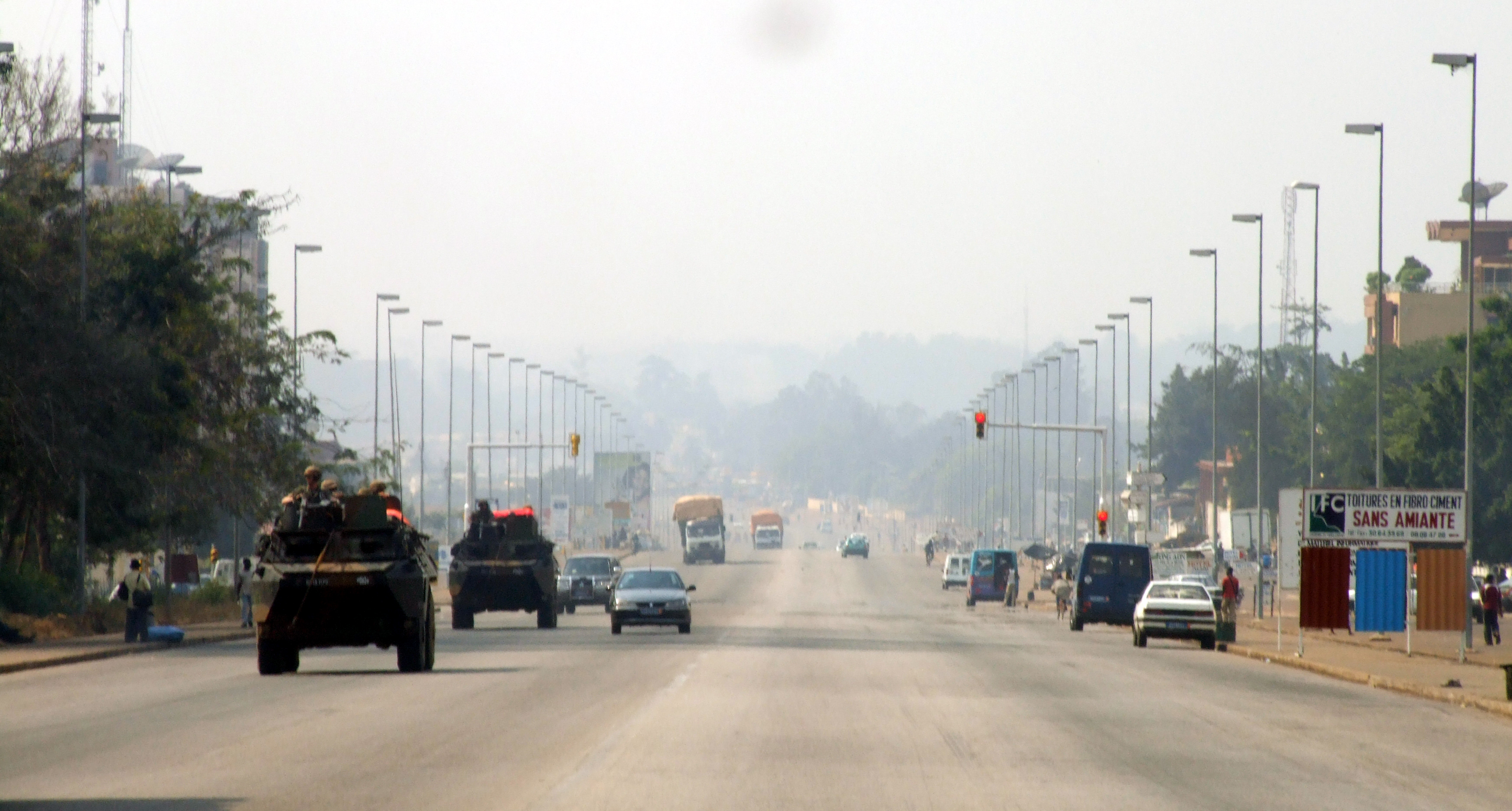
- Panoramic view of Yamoussoukro The Basilica of Our Lady of Peace Yamoussoukro International Airport Route de Abidjan Hotel des Parlementaires

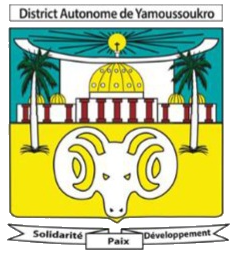
- Seal
- Nickname: "Yakro"
- Motto: "Solidarité - Paix - Développement" "Solidarity - Peace - Development"

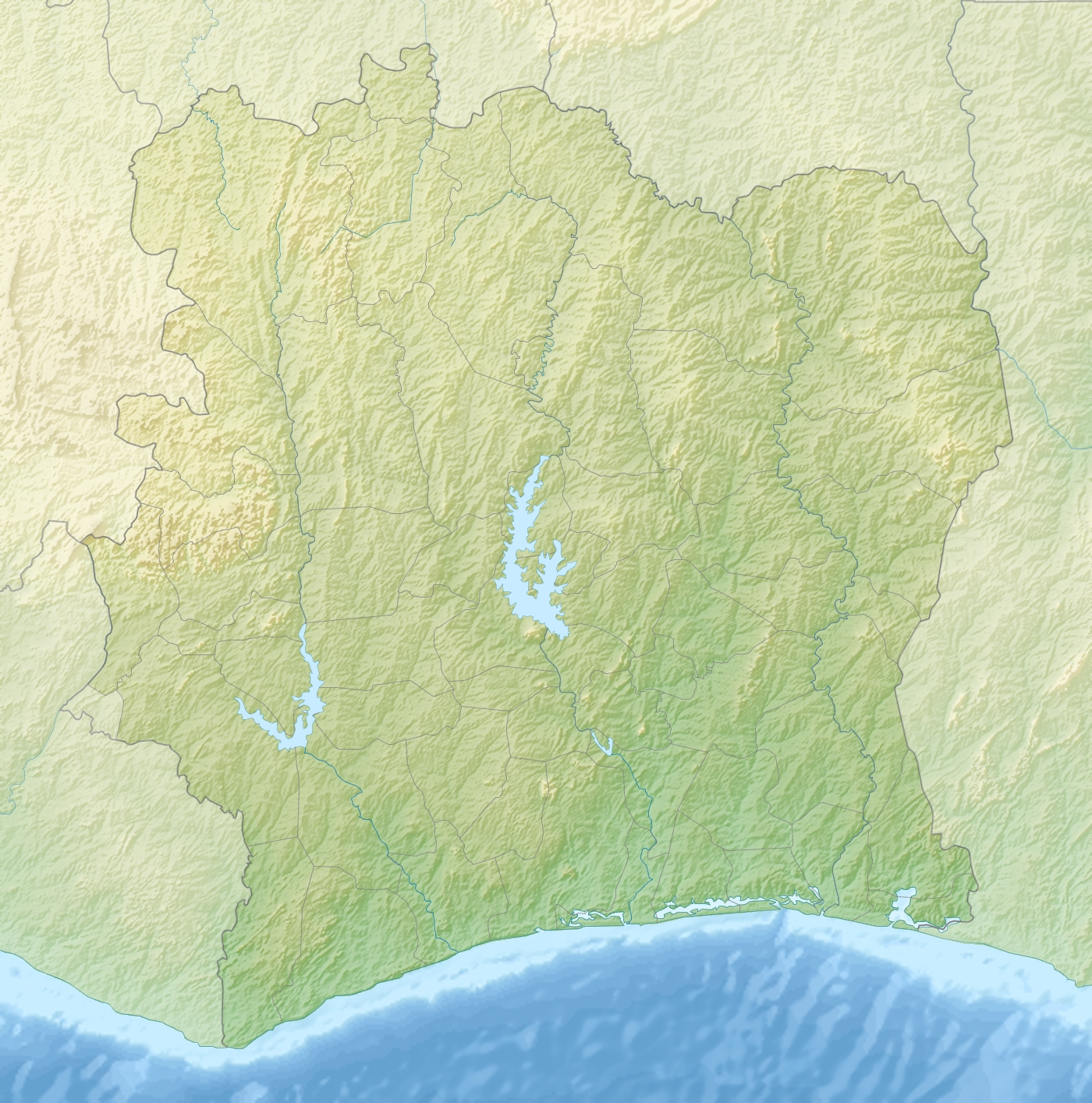
- Location within Ivory Coast Location within Africa
- Coordinates: 06°48′58″N 05°16′27″W
- Country: Ivory Coast
- District: Yamoussoukro
- Department: Yamoussoukro; Attiégouakro

Government
  - Governor: Augustin Abdoulaye Thiam Houphouët
  - Lord Mayor: Gnrangbe Kouakou Kouadio Jean

Area
  - Capital city: 2,075 km^{2} (801 sq mi)
  - Sub-Prefecture: 855 km^{2} (330 sq mi)

Population (14 Dec. 2021 census)
  - Capital city: 422,072
  - Rank: 3rd
  - Density: 203.4/km^{2} (526.8/sq mi)
  - Urban: 361,893
  - City: 279,977
  - City density: 327/km^{2} (848/sq mi)
- Time zone: UTC+00:00 (GMT)
- HDI (2022): 0.619 medium · 1st of 14
- Website: www.yamoussoukro.district.ci

Yamoussoukro (/ˌjæmʊˈsuːkroʊ/; French pronunciation: [jamusukʁo], locally [jamsokʁo]) is the capital city of Ivory Coast and an autonomous district. As of the 2014 census, Yamoussoukro is the third most populous city in the Ivory Coast, with a population of 361,893. Located 240 kilometers (150 mi) north-west of Abidjan, the district of Yamoussoukro covers 2,075 square kilometers (801 sq mi) among rolling hills and plains.

Yamoussoukro became the legal capital of Ivory Coast in 1983, although the former capital Abidjan retains several political functions. Prior to 2011, what is now the district of Yamoussoukro was part of Lacs Region. The district was created in 2011 and is split into the departments of Attiégouakro and Yamoussoukro. In total, the district contains 169 settlements. Yamoussoukro is a sub-prefecture in Yamoussoukro Department and is also a commune: since 2012, the city of Yamoussoukro has been the sole commune in the autonomous district of Yamoussoukro.

== History ==
=== Prehistory ===
Stone tools found in the country from hundreds of thousands of years ago show that the area around Yamoussoukro has been occupied since ancient times. Due to the desertification of the Sahara, many moved south to avoid the harsh conditions.

=== Colonial period ===
Queen Yamoussou, the niece of Kouassi N'Go, ran the city of N'Gokro in 1929 at the time of French colonization. The village of N'Gokro was renamed Yamoussoukro, the suffix Kro meaning town in Baoule.

Diplomatic and commercial relations were then established, but in 1909, on the orders of the Chief of Djamlabo, the Akoué revolted against the administration. Bonzi station, 7 kilometers (4.3 mi) from Yamoussoukro on the Bouaflé road, was set on fire, and the French administrator, Simon Maurice, was spared only by the intervention of Kouassi N'Go.

As the situation got worse, Maurice, judging that Bonzi had become safe, decided to transfer the French military station to Yamoussoukro, where the French Administration built a pyramid to the memory of Kouassi N'Go, Chief of the Akoué, who was assassinated in 1910 by Akoué rebels, accusing him of being too close to the French.

In 1919, the civil station of Yamoussoukro was removed. Félix Houphouët-Boigny became the leader of the village in 1939. A long period passed wherein Yamoussoukro, still a small agricultural town, remained in the shadows. This continued until after the Second World War, which saw the creation of the African Agricultural Union, as well as the first conferences of its chief. However, it was only with independence that Yamoussoukro finally started to rise.

In 1950, the village comprised 500 inhabitants.

=== Since independence ===
After 1964, the President Félix Houphouët-Boigny made ambitious plans and started to build. One day in 1965, later called the Great Lesson of Yamoussoukro, he visited the plantations with the leaders of the county, inviting them to transpose to their own villages the efforts and agricultural achievements of the region. On 21 July 1977, Houphouët offered his plantations to the State.

In March 1983, President Houphouët-Boigny made Yamoussoukro the political and administrative capital of Ivory Coast, as the city was his birthplace. This marked the fourth movement of the country's capital city in a century. Ivory Coast's previous capital cities were Grand-Bassam (1893), Bingerville (1900), and Abidjan (1933). Most economic activity still takes place in Abidjan, and it is officially designated as the "economic capital" of the country.

Yamoussoukro is the seat of Yamoussoukro Department and the neighboring Bélier Region, but Yamoussoukro itself is not part of the region.

== Governance ==
Location of the autonomous district of Yamoussoukro

Beginning in 2001, the city was governed as part of the Yamoussoukro Department and incorporated into Lacs Region. In 2011, the department was abolished and the autonomous district of Yamoussoukro was created and separated from the rest of Lacs, which became a separate district.

Unlike most districts of the country, the autonomous district of Yamoussoukro is not subdivided into regions. The district, however, is divided into departments, sub-prefectures and a commune. The district consists of the departments of Attiégouakro and Yamoussoukro. The departments further divided into the sub-prefectures of Attiégouakro, Kossou, Lolobo, and Yamoussoukro. There is one commune, which is also named Yamoussoukro, and it shares the same borders as the district. In 2011, the position of Mayor of Yamoussoukro was replaced with a district governor appointed by the head of state.

== Architecture ==
Also noteworthy are the Kossou Dam, the PDCI-RDA House, the schools of the Félix Houphouët-Boigny National Polytechnic Institute, the Town Hall, the Protestant Temple, the Mosque, and the Palace of Hosts. The Yamoussoukro International Airport had an average of six hundred passengers and 36 flights in 1995. It is one of two airports in Africa (with Gbadolite) that could accommodate the Concorde.

== Places of worship ==
Among the places of worship are predominantly Christian churches and temples: Roman Catholic Diocese of Yamoussoukro (Catholic Church), United Methodist Church Ivory Coast (World Methodist Council), Union of Missionary Baptist Churches in Ivory Coast (Baptist World Alliance), Assemblies of God. There are also Muslim mosques.

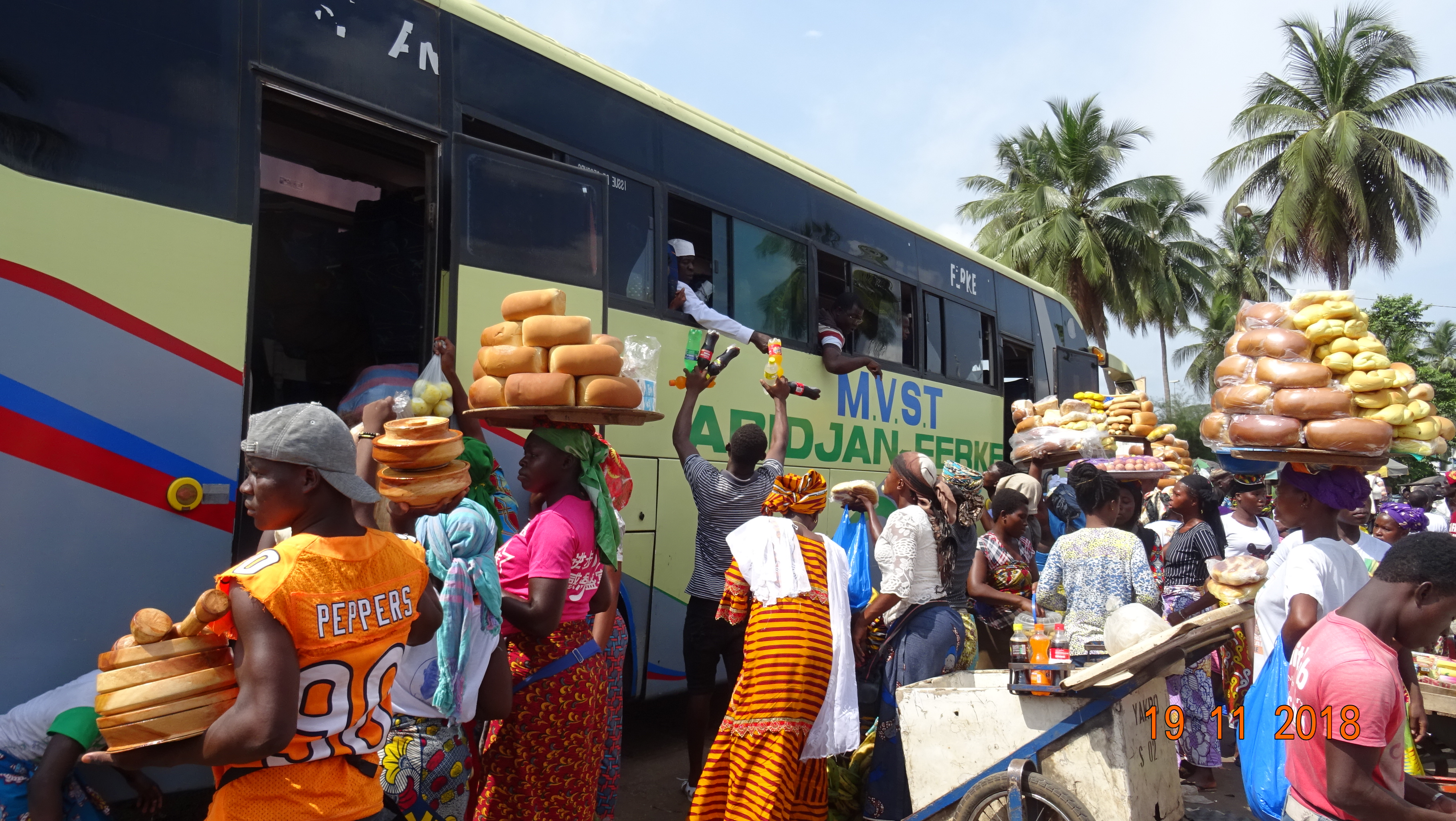
Street vendors surrounding a bus in Yamoussoukro

Yamoussoukro is the site of the largest Christian church in the world: The Basilica of Our Lady of Peace, consecrated by Pope John Paul II on 10 September 1990.

== Transport ==
The city is served by Yamoussoukro International Airport.

== Economy ==
The main activities in the city are fishing, forestry, and perfume industries.

== Climate ==
Yamoussoukro features a tropical wet and dry climate (Aw) under the Köppen-Geiger climate classification system. The city features a lengthy wet season covering the months of March through October, and a shorter dry season that covers the remaining four months. Like many other cities in West Africa, Yamoussoukro is affected by the harmattan, which serves as a primary source of the city's dry season. Despite the lengthy wet season, Yamoussoukro does not see the level of rainfall experienced in Abidjan. Yamoussoukro on average sees roughly 1,130 millimeters (44 in) of precipitation annually.

Climate data for Yamoussoukro (1991-2020) normals
Month	Jan	Feb	Mar	Apr	May	Jun	Jul	Aug	Sep	Oct	Nov	Dec	Year
Mean daily maximum °C (°F)	35.2 (95.4)	36.5 (97.7)	35.5 (95.9)	34.5 (94.1)	33.4 (92.1)	32 (90)	30.6 (87.1)	30.2 (86.4)	31.5 (88.7)	32.4 (90.3)	33.3 (91.9)	33.4 (92.1)	33.2 (91.8)
Daily mean °C (°F)	25.2 (77.4)	27.3 (81.1)	27.6 (81.7)	27.3 (81.1)	26.5 (79.7)	25.6 (78.1)	24.5 (76.1)	24.5 (76.1)	24.8 (76.6)	25.2 (77.4)	25.5 (77.9)	24.5 (76.1)	25.7 (78.3)
Mean daily minimum °C (°F)	18.9 (66.0)	21.2 (70.2)	21.8 (71.2)	21.8 (71.2)	21.3 (70.3)	21.1 (70.0)	20.4 (68.7)	20.6 (69.1)	20.4 (68.7)	20.4 (68.7)	20.3 (68.5)	19 (66)	20.6 (69.1)
Average precipitation mm (inches)	11.7 (0.46)	47.2 (1.86)	107.8 (4.24)	141.7 (5.58)	155.1 (6.11)	159.5 (6.28)	108.9 (4.29)	86.7 (3.41)	146 (5.7)	138.3 (5.44)	54.7 (2.15)	16.6 (0.65)	1,174.2 (46.17)
Average precipitation days (≥ 1.0 mm)	0.8	3.4	7.4	9.1	10.3	11.4	7.9	7.3	11	11.2	5.7	2.1	87.6
Mean monthly sunshine hours	222.5	206.7	214.3	225.2	214.5	151.5	115.3	95.5	121.8	187.4	206.6	209.3	2,170.6
Percentage possible sunshine	56	56	54	57	55	40	32	24	33	50	52	46	49
Average ultraviolet index	11	12	12	12	12	11	11	12	12	12	11	10	12
Source 1:
Source 2:

== Education ==
The Institut National Polytechnique Félix Houphouët-Boigny was founded in 1996.

== Sport ==
The city hosted the 2019 World Draughts Championship in draughts and is home to the Ivory Coast Open tennis tournament.

The city's two football teams SOA and ASC Ouragahio share the Yamoussoukro Stadium.

FC Bibo play in the suburb of Kossou.

SOA's basketball club plays in the top division.

The city was scheduled to host group stage games for the AFCON 2023, delayed due to weather conditions to January 2024.
