= Toumodi =

- Town, sub-prefecture, and commune
- Location in Ivory Coast
- Coordinates: 6°33′N 5°1′W
- Country: Ivory Coast
- District: Lacs
- Region: Bélier
- Department: Toumodi

Area
  - Total: 864 km^{2} (334 sq mi)

Population (2021 census)
  - Total: 88,580
  - Density: 103/km^{2} (266/sq mi)
  - Town: 43,189
- (2014 census)
- Time zone: UTC+0 (GMT)

Toumodi is a town in south-central Ivory Coast. It is a sub-prefecture of and the seat of Toumodi Department in Bélier Region, Lacs District. Toumodi is also a commune.

In 2021, the population of the sub-prefecture of Toumodi was 88,580.

== Villages ==
The 30 villages of the sub-prefecture of Toumodi and their population in 2014 are:

1. Abli-Aloukro (773)
2. Abli-Bonikro (648)
3. Agbagnassou (188)
4. Akouékouadiokro (505)
5. Bendressou (1 097)
6. Blé (253)
7. Diékèkro (464)
8. Kahankro (2 424)
9. Ouaouakro (1 078)
10. Pokoukro (376)
11. Sakassou (741)
12. Toto-Kouassikro (1 048)
13. Toumodi (43 189)
14. Akakro N'zikpri (1 039)
15. Akunvikro (666)
16. Anikro (499)
17. Assounvouè (1 406)
18. Bofrébo (550)
19. Comékro (223)
20. Dougba (195)
21. Kadjokro (522)
22. Kouamé-Bonou (403)
23. Lahourébo (332)
24. Lomo-Sud (373)
25. Loukou-Yaokro (803)
26. N'doukahakro (1 213)
27. Tontonou (536)
28. Tontonou-Koffikro (380)
29. Yobouébo (567)
30. Zahakro (939)
