= Tiébissou =

- Town, sub-prefecture, and commune
- Location in Ivory Coast
- Coordinates: 7°9′N 5°14′W
- Country: Ivory Coast
- District: Lacs
- Region: Bélier
- Department: Tiébissou

Area
  - Total: 934 km^{2} (361 sq mi)

Population (2021 census)
  - Total: 65,251
  - Density: 69.9/km^{2} (181/sq mi)
  - Town: 18,832
- (2014 census)
- Time zone: UTC+0 (GMT)

Tiébissou is a town in central Ivory Coast. It is a sub-prefecture of and the seat of Tiébissou Department in Bélier Region, Lacs District. Tiébissou is also a commune.

In 2021, the population of the sub-prefecture of Tiébissou was 65,251.

== Villages ==
The 37 villages of the sub-prefecture of Tiébissou and their population in 2014 are:

1. Bofia (1 241)
2. Bomizambo (1 410)
3. Golibo (136)
4. Koffi-Kouassikro (1 307)
5. Kondé-Yaokro (1 398)
6. Koubi (1 330)
7. Kpato-Djamalabo (438)
8. Minambo (1 097)
9. N'gangoro Nanafouè (1 051)
10. Propronou (521)
11. Taki-Salékro (1 189)
12. Tiébissou (18 832)
13. Affoué-Kokorékro (637)
14. Ahitou-Kongonou (950)
15. Ahougnassou N'drikro (1 168)
16. Ahougnassou-Allahou (1 042)
17. Ahougnassou-N'gbanou (1 001)
18. Ahoumouan-Kouamékro (564)
19. Akoi-N'dénou (1 413)
20. Allaha Koffikro (1 018)
21. Assabonou (1 135)
22. Assé-Djèkro (288)
23. Assé-M'bo (1 042)
24. Assé-N'gou (530)
25. Ayaprikro (1 283)
26. Bopri (438)
27. Djangokro (619)
28. Djézoukro (534)
29. Duibo (668)
30. M'bouédio (850)
31. Mékoinkro (471)
32. N'gattadolikro (2 925)
33. N'gokro (854)
34. Tollabonou (880)
35. Totokro (509)
36. Yaakro (490)
37. Yao-Golikro (280)
