= Tiébissou Department =

Coordinates: 7°16′N 5°29′W

Tiébissou Department Département de Tiébissou
- Department
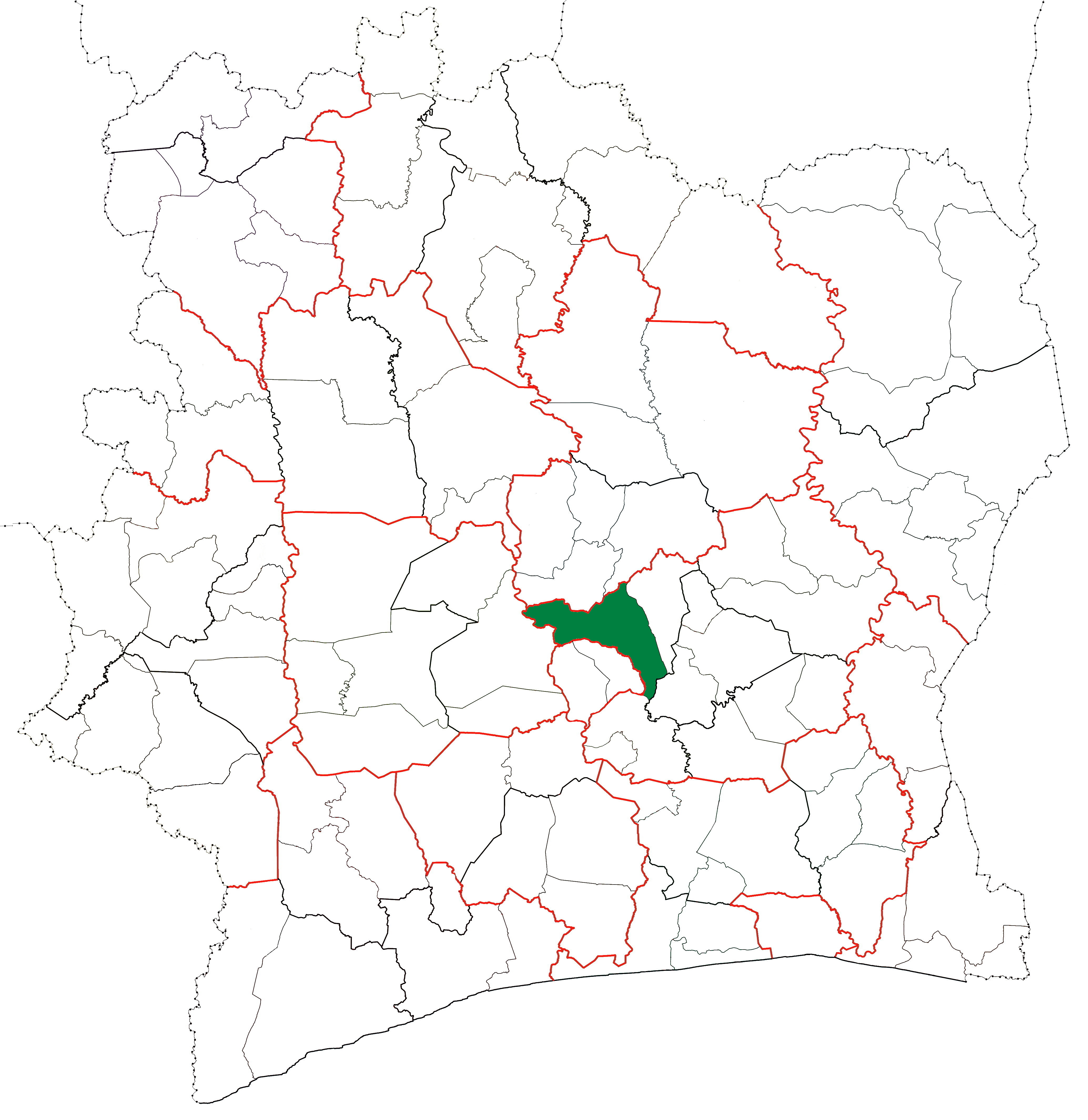
- Location in Ivory Coast. Tiébissou Department has had these boundaries since 2005.
- Country: Ivory Coast
- District: Lacs
- Region: Bélier
- 1998: Established as a second-level subdivision via a division of Yamoussoukro Dept
- 2005: Divided to create Didiévi Dept
- 2011: Converted to a third-level subdivision
- Departmental seat: Tiébissou

Government
  - Prefect: Pascal Kifory Ouattara

Area
  - Total: 2,480 km^{2} (960 sq mi)

Population (2021 census)
  - Total: 116,321
  - Density: 46.9/km^{2} (121/sq mi)
- Time zone: UTC+0 (GMT)

Tiébissou Department is a department of Bélier Region in Lacs District, Ivory Coast. In 2021, its population was 116,321 and its seat is the settlement of Tiébissou. The sub-prefectures of the department are Lomokankro, Molonou, Tiébissou, and Yakpabo-Sakassou.

== History ==
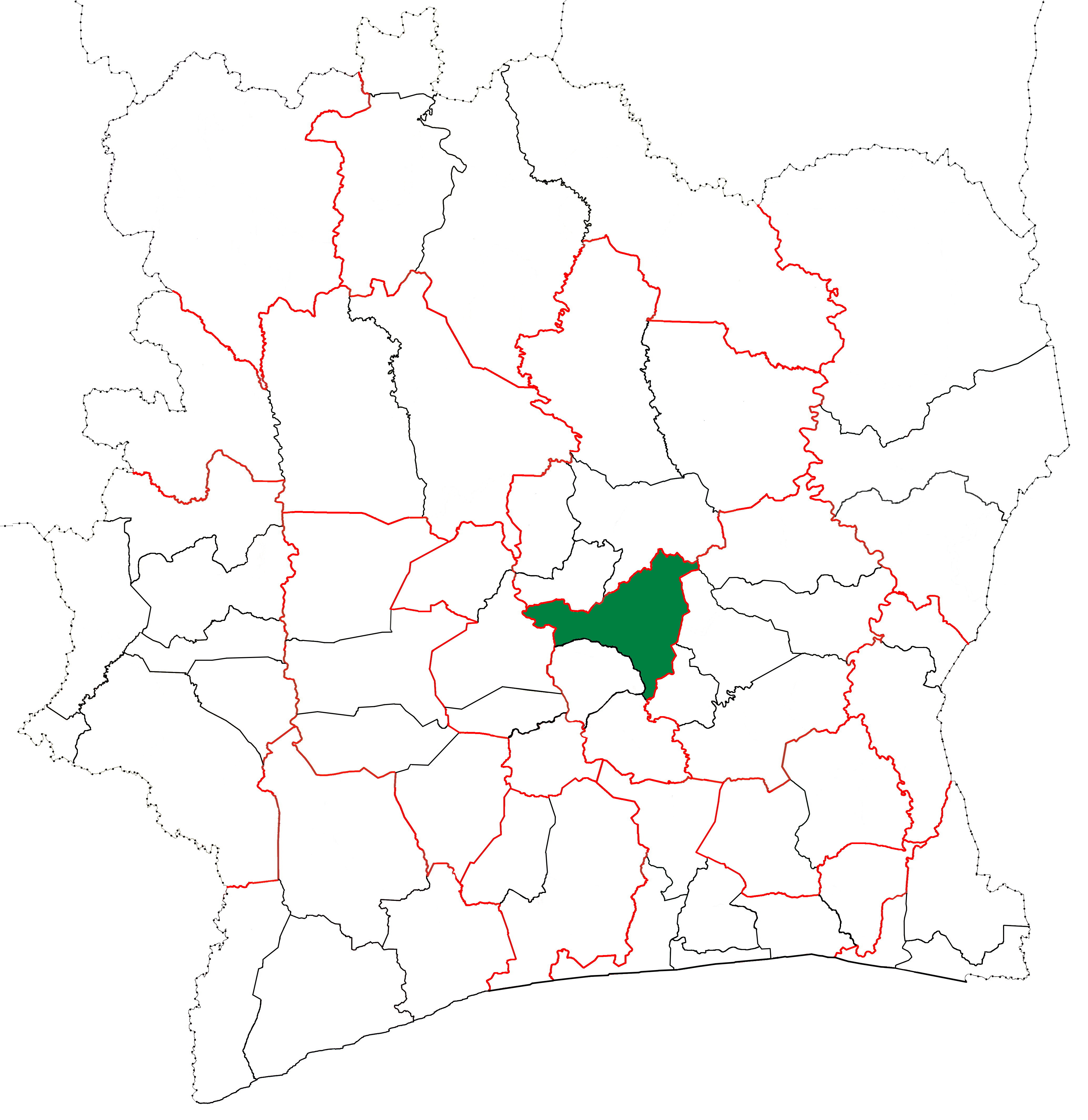
Tiébissou Department upon its creation in 1998. It kept these boundaries until 2005, but other subdivision boundary changes began to be made in 2000.

Tiébissou Department was created in 1998 as a second-level subdivision via a split-off from Yamoussoukro Department. At its creation, it was part of Lacs Region.

In 2005, Tiébissou Department was divided in order to create Didiévi Department.

In 2011, districts were introduced as new first-level subdivisions of Ivory Coast. At the same time, regions were reorganised and became second-level subdivisions and all departments were converted into third-level subdivisions. At this time, Tiébissou Department became part of Bélier Region in Lacs District.
