= Toumodi Department =

Coordinates: 6°55′N 5°3′W

Toumodi Department Département de Toumodi
- Department
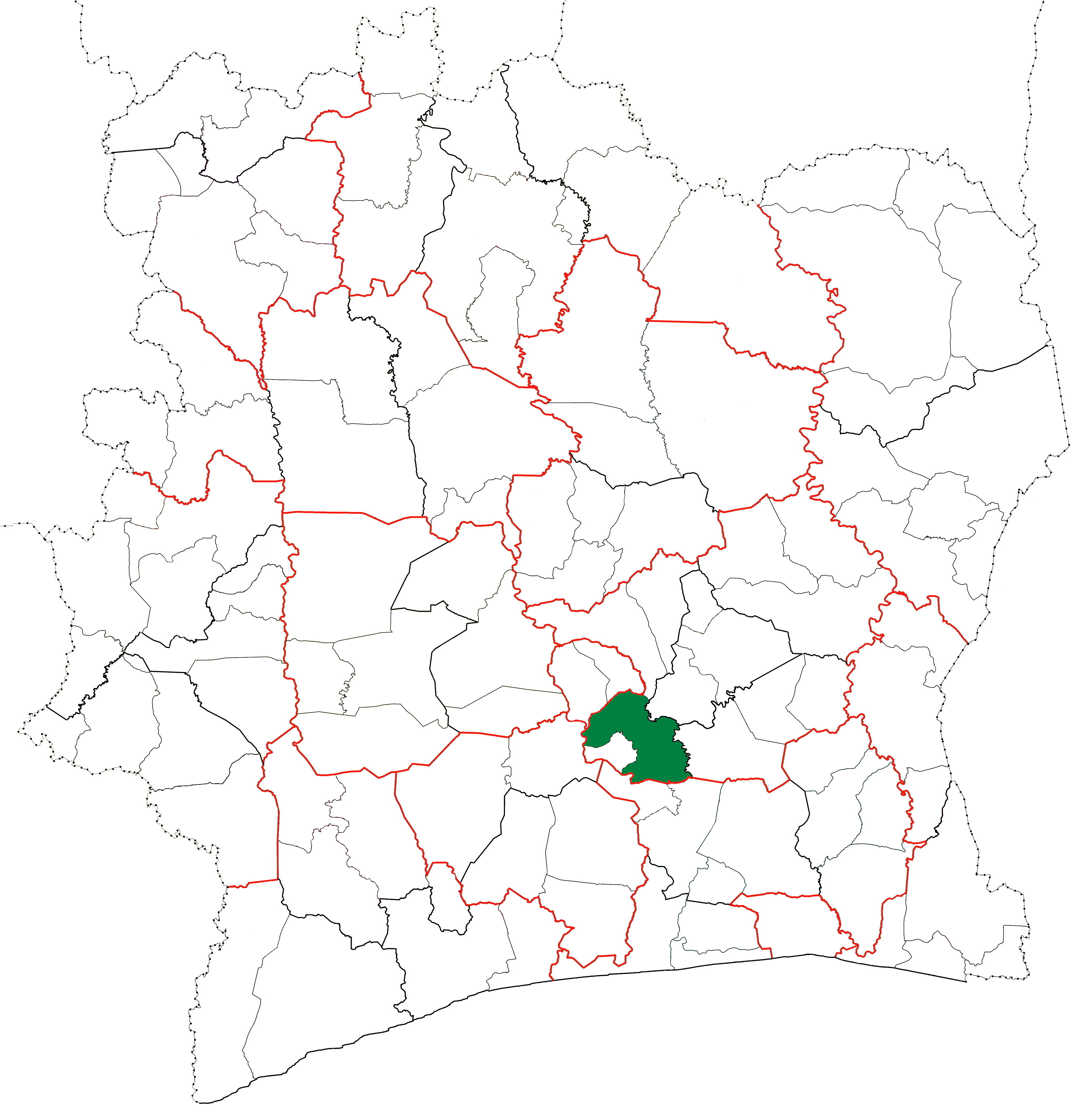
- Location in Ivory Coast. Toumodi Department has had these boundaries since 2012.
- Country: Ivory Coast
- District: Lacs
- Region: Bélier
- 1988: Established as a first-level subdivision via a division of Bouaké Dept
- 1997: Converted to a second-level subdivision
- 2011: Converted to a third-level subdivision
- 2012: Divided to create Djékanou Dept
- Departmental seat: Toumodi

Government
  - Prefect: Gando Coulibaly

Area
  - Total: 2,250 km^{2} (870 sq mi)

Population (2021 census)
  - Total: 168,363
  - Density: 74.8/km^{2} (194/sq mi)
- Time zone: UTC+0 (GMT)

Toumodi Department is a department of Bélier Region in Lacs District, Ivory Coast. In 2021, its population was 168,363 and its seat is the settlement of Toumodi. The sub-prefectures of the department are Angoda, Kokumbo, Kpouèbo, and Toumodi.

== History ==
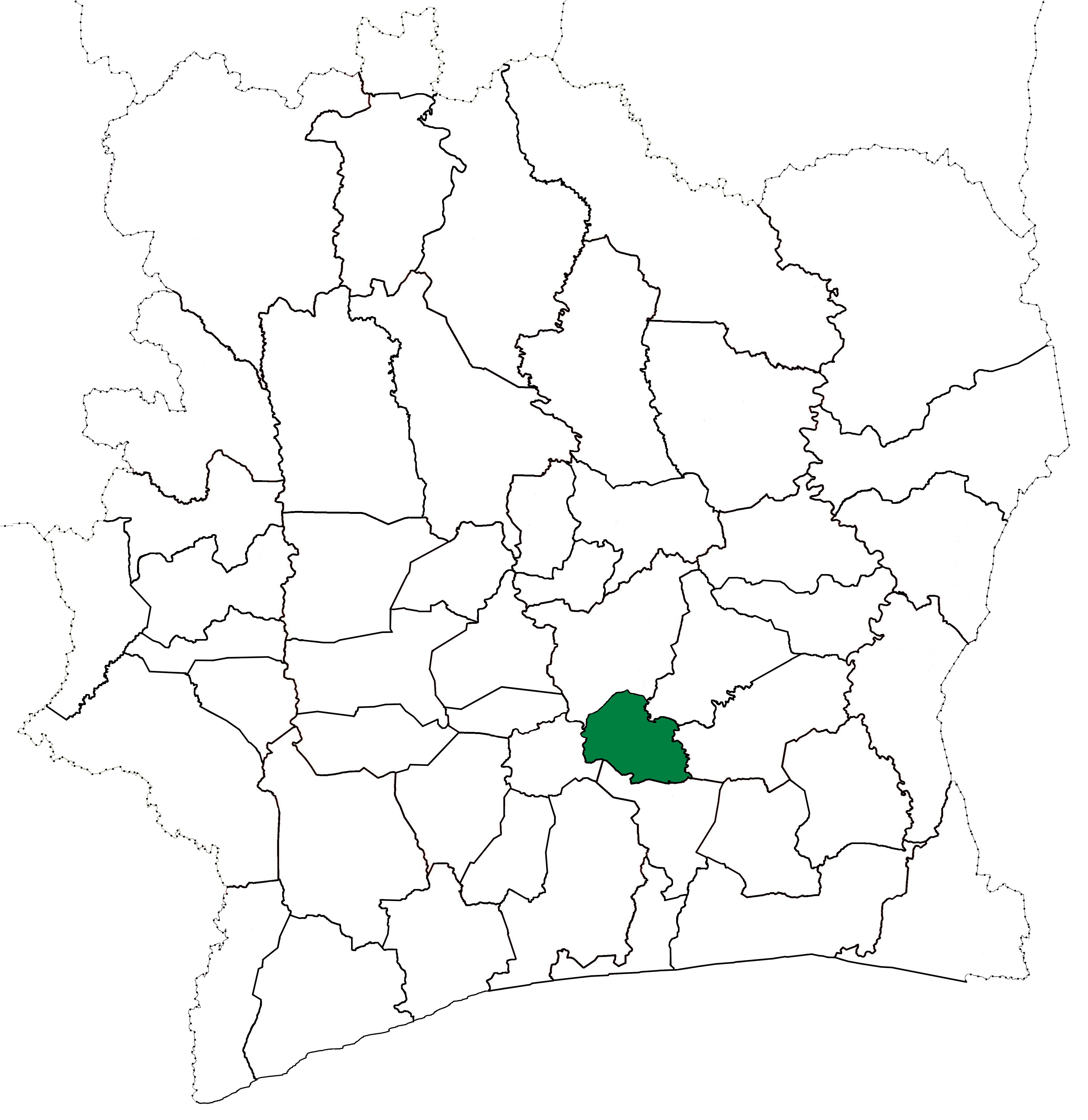
Toumodi Department upon its creation in 1988. It kept these boundaries until 2012, but other subdivision boundary changes began to be made in 1995.

Toumodi Department was created in 1988 as a first-level subdivision via a split-off from Bouaké Department.

In 1997, regions were introduced as new first-level subdivisions of Ivory Coast; as a result, all departments were converted into second-level subdivisions. Toumodi Department was included in Lacs Region.

In 2011, districts were introduced as new first-level subdivisions of Ivory Coast. At the same time, regions were reorganised and became second-level subdivisions and all departments were converted into third-level subdivisions. At this time, Toumodi Department became part of Bélier Region in Lacs District.

In 2012, two sub-prefectures were split from Toumodi Department to create Djékanou Department.
