= Didiévi Department =

Coordinates: 7°8′N 4°54′W

Didiévi Department Département de Didiévi
- Department
- Location in Ivory Coast. Didiévi Department has retained the same boundaries since its creation in 2005.
- Country: Ivory Coast
- District: Lacs
- Region: Bélier
- 2005: Established as a second-level subdivision via a division of Tiébissou Dept
- 2011: Converted to a third-level subdivision
- Departmental seat: Didiévi

Government
  - Prefect: René Kouakou N'Guessan Dossan

Area
  - Total: 1,700 km^{2} (660 sq mi)

Population (2021 census)
  - Total: 93,629
  - Density: 55/km^{2} (140/sq mi)
- Time zone: UTC+0 (GMT)

Didiévi Department is a department of Bélier Region in Lacs District, Ivory Coast. In 2021, its population was 93,629 and its seat is the settlement of Didiévi. The sub-prefectures of the department are Boli, Didiévi, Molonou-Blé, Raviart, and Tié-N'Diékro.

== History ==
Didiévi Department was created in 2005 as a second-level subdivision via a split-off from Tiébissou Department. At its creation, it was part of Lacs Region.

In 2011, districts were introduced as new first-level subdivisions of Ivory Coast. At the same time, regions were reorganised and became second-level subdivisions and all departments were converted into third-level subdivisions. At this time, Didiévi Department became part of Bélier Region in Lacs District.
