= Bélier Region =

Coordinates: 6°55′N 5°3′W

Bélier Region Région du Bélier
- Region
- Seal

- Region location map (dark blue) in Côte d'Ivoire.
- Country: Ivory Coast
- Established: 2011
- Regional seat: Toumodi

Government
  - Prefect: Patrice Gueu
  - Regional Council President: Kouassi Pascal Yéboué-Kouamé

Area
  - Total: 6,900 km^{2} (2,700 sq mi)

Population (2021 census)
  - Total: 415,593
  - Density: 60/km^{2} (160/sq mi)
- Time zone: UTC+0 (GMT)
- Website: regionbelier.ci

Bélier Region is one of the 31 regions of Ivory Coast. The region's population in the 2021 census was 415,593. The seat of the region is in Toumodi.

Prior to 2017, the seat of the region was in Yamoussoukro, outside the region, and the prefect of Yamoussoukro was acting as region prefect of Bélier.

Bélier is currently divided into four departments: Didiévi, Djékanou, Tiébissou, and Toumodi.

== History ==
The Bélier region is established in 2011 by the split of the former Lacs Région in the Yamoussoukro Autonomous District and the region of Bélier. With the regions of Iffou and N'Zi, it is included in the Lacs District. At the time, Bélier is divided in three departments: Didiévi, Tiébissou, and Toumodi. Toumodi is separated from the other departments by the autonomous district of Yamoussoukro. The provisional seat of the region is at Yamoussoukro.

In 2012, the Toumodi department is split to create the Djékanou one. The same year, within the Lacs district, the region of N'Zi region is split in two to create Moronou region. The districts are abolished in 2014.

In December 2016, the govern nominates a region prefect distinct from Yamoussoukro's, officialising the position of Toumodi as seat of the region.
