= Konandikro =

- Village
- Location in Ivory Coast
- Coordinates: 7°45′N 4°1′W
- Country: Ivory Coast
- District: Lacs
- Region: Iffou
- Department: Prikro
- Sub-prefecture: Prikro
- Time zone: UTC+0 (GMT)

Konandikro is a village in eastern Ivory Coast. It is in the sub-prefecture of Prikro, Prikro Department, Iffou Region, Lacs District.

Konandikro was a commune until March 2012, when it became one of 1,126 communes nationwide that were abolished.
