= Attokro =

- Village
- Location in Ivory Coast
- Coordinates: 7°50′N 4°21′W
- Country: Ivory Coast
- District: Lacs
- Region: Iffou
- Department: M'Bahiakro
- Sub-prefecture: Kondossou
- Time zone: UTC+0 (GMT)

Attokro is a village in eastern Ivory Coast. It is in the sub-prefecture of Kondossou, M'Bahiakro Department, Iffou Region, Lacs District.

Attokro was a commune until March 2012, when it became one of 1,126 communes nationwide that were abolished.
