= N'Dénou =

- Village
- Location in Ivory Coast
- Coordinates: 7°57′N 4°48′W
- Country: Ivory Coast
- District: Vallée du Bandama
- Region: Gbêkê
- Department: Bouaké
- Sub-prefecture: Bouaké-SP
- Time zone: UTC+0 (GMT)

N'Dénou is a village in central Ivory Coast. It is in the sub-prefecture of Bouaké-SP, Bouaké Department, Gbêkê Region, Vallée du Bandama District.

N'Dénou was a commune until March 2012, when it became one of 1,126 communes nationwide that were abolished.
