= Foto-Kouamékro =

- Village
- Location in Ivory Coast
- Coordinates: 7°34′N 5°7′W
- Country: Ivory Coast
- District: Vallée du Bandama
- Region: Gbêkê
- Department: Sakassou
- Sub-prefecture: Dibri-Assirikro
- Time zone: UTC+0 (GMT)

Foto-Kouamékro is a village in central Ivory Coast. It is in the sub-prefecture of Dibri-Assirikro, Sakassou Department, Gbêkê Region, Vallée du Bandama District.

Foto-Kouamékro was a commune until March 2012, when it became one of 1,126 communes nationwide that were abolished.
