= Babakro =

- Village
- Location in Ivory Coast
- Coordinates: 7°47′N 3°59′W
- Country: Ivory Coast
- District: Lacs
- Region: Iffou
- Department: Prikro
- Sub-prefecture: Prikro
- Time zone: UTC+0 (GMT)

Babakro is a village in Ivory Coast. It is in the sub-prefecture of Prikro, Prikro Department, Iffou Region, Lacs District.

Babakro was a commune until March 2012, when it became one of 1,126 communes nationwide that were abolished.
