= Ahougnansou =

- Village
- Location in Ivory Coast
- Coordinates: 7°26′N 5°22′W
- Country: Ivory Coast
- District: Vallée du Bandama
- Region: Gbêkê
- Department: Sakassou
- Sub-prefecture: Sakassou
- Time zone: UTC+0 (GMT)

Ahougnansou is a village in central Ivory Coast. It is in the sub-prefecture of Sakassou, Sakassou Department, Gbêkê Region, Vallée du Bandama District.

Ahougnansou was a commune until March 2012, when it became one of 1,126 communes nationwide that were abolished.
