= Zédé-Dianhoun =

- Village
- Location in Ivory Coast
- Coordinates: 7°31′N 5°26′W
- Country: Ivory Coast
- District: Vallée du Bandama
- Region: Gbêkê
- Department: Béoumi
- Sub-prefecture: Béoumi
- Time zone: UTC+0 (GMT)

Zédé-Dianhoun is a village in central Ivory Coast. It is in the sub-prefecture of Béoumi, Béoumi Department, Gbêkê Region, Vallée du Bandama District.

Zédé-Dianhoun was a commune until March 2012, when it became one of 1,126 communes nationwide that were abolished.
