= N'Zi-N'Ziblékro =

- Village
- Location in Ivory Coast
- Coordinates: 7.38°N 4.00°W
- Country: Ivory Coast
- District: Lacs
- Region: Iffou
- Department: M'Bahiakro
- Sub-prefecture: M'Bahiakro
- Time zone: UTC+0 (GMT)

N'Zi-N'Ziblékro is a village in eastern Ivory Coast. It is in the sub-prefecture of M'Bahiakro in M'Bahiakro Department, Iffou Region, Lacs District.

N'Zi-N'Ziblékro was a commune until March 2012, when it became one of 1,126 communes nationwide that were abolished.
