= Moussobadougou =

Moussobadougou Ouassadougou
- Village
- Location in Ivory Coast
- Coordinates: 7°42′N 4°14′W
- Country: Ivory Coast
- District: Lacs
- Region: Iffou
- Department: M'Bahiakro
- Sub-prefecture: Bonguéra
- Time zone: UTC+0 (GMT)

Moussobadougou (also known as Ouassadougou) is a village in central Ivory Coast. It is in the sub-prefecture of Bonguéra, M'Bahiakro Department, Iffou Region, Lacs District.

Moussobadougou was a commune until March 2012, when it became one of 1,126 communes nationwide that were abolished.
