= Lolobo =

Lolobo may refer to:

- Lolobo, Vallée du Bandama, a town and sub-prefecture of Béoumi Department, Gbêkê Region, Vallée du Bandama District, Ivory Coast
- Lolobo, Yamoussoukro, a town and sub-prefecture of the autonomous district of Yamoussoukro, Ivory Coast
