= Mamini =

- Town and sub-prefecture
- Location in Ivory Coast
- Coordinates: 7°44′N 4°48′W
- Country: Ivory Coast
- District: Vallée du Bandama
- Region: Gbêkê
- Department: Bouaké

Population (2014)
  - Total: 15,200
- Time zone: UTC+0 (GMT)

Mamini is a town in central Ivory Coast. It is a sub-prefecture of Bouaké Department in Gbêkê Region, Vallée du Bandama District.

Mamini was a commune until March 2012, when it became one of 1,126 communes nationwide that were abolished.

In 2014, the population of the sub-prefecture of Mamini was 15,200.

== Villages ==
The 31 villages of the sub-prefecture of Mamini and their populations in 2014 are:

1. Abouokro (267)
2. Adikro (571)
3. Adikro-Foundi (266)
4. Ahouzankro (507)
5. Alloukro (660)
6. Ayabo (501)
7. Bobokro (811)
8. Boka Kouamekro (472)
9. Bokassi (271)
10. Fetekro (521)
11. Frondobo (104)
12. Kanguierenou (270)
13. Kirakro (419)
14. Kouakro (789)
15. Kouamekro (179)
16. Koubekro (161)
17. Kpekekro (889)
18. Lagaviara (203)
19. Mamini (881)
20. N'dokro (304)
21. N'drikro (73)
22. Sabaridougou (158)
23. Saminikro (1,119)
24. Sarakakro (944)
25. Somelassou (486)
26. Takassou (605)
27. Takikro (401)
28. Tanou Broukro (401)
29. Tiebissou (180)
30. Yao Amoinkro (657)
31. Zougban (1,130)
