= Tiemoko =

Tiemoko is a given name. Notable people with the name include:

- Tiemoko Fofana (born 1999), Ivorian footballer
- Tiémoko Konaté (born 1990), Ivorian footballer
- Tiémoko Meyliet Koné (born 1949), Ivorian politician
- Tiemoko Garan Kouyaté (1902-1942), Malian teacher
- Tiemoko Ouattara (born 2005), Swiss footballer
- Tiémoko Sangaré (born 1957), Malian politician
- Sidi Tiémoko Touré, Ivorian politician
