= Marabadiassa =

- Town and sub-prefecture
- Location in Ivory Coast
- Coordinates: 8°6′N 5°26′W
- Country: Ivory Coast
- District: Vallée du Bandama
- Region: Gbêkê
- Department: Béoumi

Population (2014)
  - Total: 6,640
- Time zone: UTC+0 (GMT)

Marabadiassa is a town in central Ivory Coast. It is a sub-prefecture of Béoumi Department in Gbêkê Region, Vallée du Bandama District. The town sits less than one kilometre south of the border of Woroba District.

Marabadiassa was a commune until March 2012, when it became one of 1,126 communes nationwide that were abolished.

In 2014, the population of the sub-prefecture of Marabadiassa was 6,640.

== History ==
The town was originally named Tufan, and was an important stop on the dry-season trade route linking Sikasso with Bonduku. In the early 19th century, a Hausa caravan was ambushed by a local chief. The mallam of the caravan, Sulemanu, who had his holy books stolen, organized the local Hausa population to take over Tufan and turn it into a base for their protection and raids into the surrounding area. It came to be called Marabadiassa, meansing 'Hausa town' in Bambara.

== Villages ==
The nine villages of the sub-prefecture of Marabadiassa and their population in 2014 are

1. Allokokro (501)
2. Blimplo (314)
3. Goli-Maya (1,417)
4. Kpetessou (222)
5. Mangoua-Okoukro (601)
6. Marabadjassa (2,289)
7. Plikro (511)
8. Toudjan 1 (274)
9. Toudjan 2 (511)
