= Famienkro =

- Town and sub-prefecture
- Location in Ivory Coast
- Coordinates: 7°46′N 3°59′W
- Country: Ivory Coast
- District: Lacs
- Region: Iffou
- Department: Prikro

Population (2014)
  - Total: 11,217
- Time zone: UTC+0 (GMT)

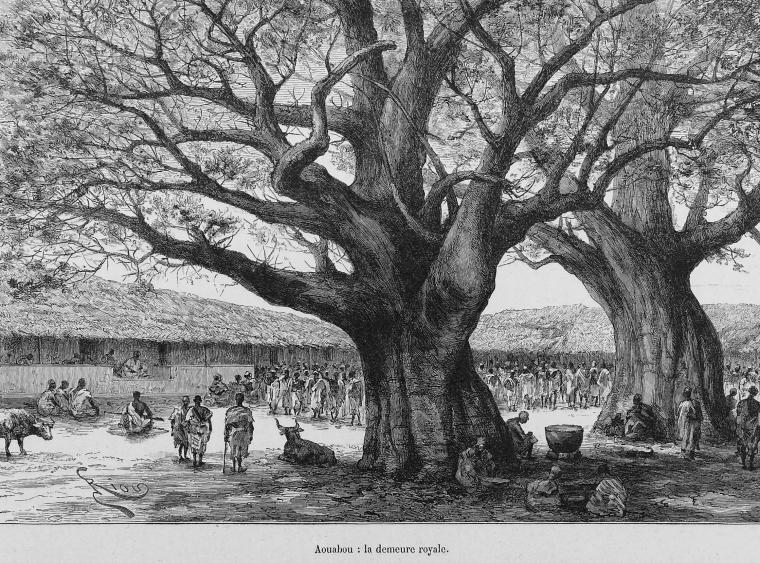
Aouabou, 1892

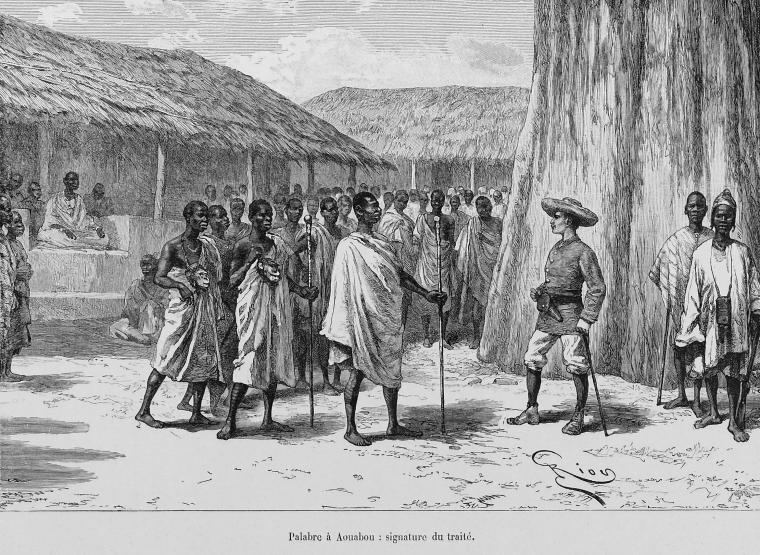
Signing the Aouabou Treaty, 1892

Famienkro is a town in east-central Ivory Coast. It is a sub-prefecture of Prikro Department in Iffou Region, Lacs District.

Famienkro was a commune until March 2012, when it became one of 1,126 communes nationwide that were abolished.

In 2014, the population of the sub-prefecture of Famienkro was 11,217.

== Villages ==
The 13 villages of the sub-prefecture of Famienkro and their population in 2014 are:

1. Assouadié (693)
2. Bénian (273)
3. Bognankro (1,257)
4. Ettien-N'guessankro (351)
5. Famienkro (2,590)
6. Groumania (633)
7. Kamaya (441)
8. Kamélesso (1,268)
9. Koffesso (1,300)
10. Lindoukro (609)
11. Morokro (552)
12. Sérébou (547)
13. Timbo (703)
