= Morokinkro =

- Village
- Location in Ivory Coast
- Coordinates: 6°49′02″N 4°59′40″W
- Country: Ivory Coast
- District: Yamoussoukro
- Department: Attiégouakro
- Sub-prefecture: Attiégouakro
- Time zone: UTC+0 (GMT)

Morokinkro is a village in central Ivory Coast. It is in the sub-prefecture of Attiégouakro in the Attiégouakro Department of the Autonomous District of Yamoussoukro.

Morokinkro was a commune until March 2012, when it became one of 1,126 communes nationwide that were abolished.
