= Bonguéra =

- Town and sub-prefecture
- Location in Ivory Coast
- Coordinates: 7°40′N 4°14′W
- Country: Ivory Coast
- District: Lacs
- Region: Iffou
- Department: M'Bahiakro

Population (2014)
  - Total: 18,560
- Time zone: UTC+0 (GMT)

Bonguéra is a town in east-central Ivory Coast. It is a sub-prefecture of M'Bahiakro Department in Iffou Region, Lacs District.

Bonguéra was a commune until March 2012, when it became one of 1,126 communes nationwide that were abolished.

In 2014, the population of the sub-prefecture of Bonguéra was 18,560.

== Villages ==
The 20 villages of the sub-prefecture of Bonguéra and their population in 2014 are:

1. Anzandougou (300)
2. Bonguéra (3,146)
3. Bédara (617)
4. Dondoni (791)
5. Désidougou (820)
6. Koffidougou (826)
7. Konkidougou (977)
8. Kossandougou (576)
9. Kouakoudougou (1,617)
10. Koumandougou (385)
11. Krohoudougou (152)
12. Manidougou (628)
13. Moussobadougou (952)
14. N'dodougou (445)
15. Ouassadougou (2,671)
16. Sandougou-Kossia (988)
17. Sandougou-Kouma (753)
18. Siaridougou (490)
19. Tollédougou (289)
20. Totodougou (1,136)
