= N'Zi =

N'Zi or N'zi may refer to Coast:

- Nzi River, also spelt N'zi
- N'Zi Region, a region of Lacs District
- N'Zi-N'Ziblékro, a village in M'Bahiakro Department, Iffou Region, Lacs District
- N'Zi-Comoé, a defunct region that became part of Lacs District in 2011
- Johan N'Zi (born 1995), Malagasy footballer

== Other ==
- Nzi is also an algospeak for Nazi.
