= Nafana, Lacs =

Nafana
- Town and sub-prefecture
- Location in Ivory Coast
- Coordinates: 7°36′N 3°44′W
- Country: Ivory Coast
- District: Lacs
- Region: Iffou
- Department: Prikro

Population (2014)
  - Total: 10,623
- Time zone: UTC+0 (GMT)

Nafana is a town in eastern Ivory Coast. It is a sub-prefecture of Prikro Department in Iffou Region, Lacs District. The border of Zanzan District lies seven kilometres east of the town.

Nafana was a commune until March 2012, when it became one of 1,126 communes nationwide that were abolished.

In 2014, the population of the sub-prefecture of Nafana was 10,623.

== Villages ==
The 11 villages of the sub-prefecture of Nafana and their population in 2014 are:

1. Agnassou (334)
2. Ahouan-Bonvoinsou (843)
3. Ahouan-Débarcadère (1,000)
4. Alluinamouénou (1,110)
5. Alluissou (952)
6. Assoumou-Kouassikro (896)
7. Elognékro (899)
8. Koffi-Akakro (1,447)
9. Koffi-Ségbrégbékro (458)
10. Nafana (1,598)
11. Tétessi (1,057)
