= Botro =

Botro Kouadio Kro
- Town, sub-prefecture, and commune
- Location in Ivory Coast
- Coordinates: 7°51′N 5°19′W
- Country: Ivory Coast
- District: Vallée du Bandama
- Region: Gbêkê
- Department: Botro

Population (2014)
  - Total: 20,337
- Time zone: UTC+0 (GMT)

Botro (also known as Kouadio Kro) is a town in central Ivory Coast. It is a sub-prefecture of and the seat of Botro Department in Gbêkê Region, Vallée du Bandama District. Botro is also a commune.

In 2014, the population of the sub-prefecture of Botro was 20,337.

== Villages ==
The 53 villages of the sub-prefecture of Botro and their population in 2014 are:

1. Abey-Ahougnassou (202)
2. Abey-Kouadiokro (291)
3. Adiébonou (285)
4. Baméla (512)
5. Botro (10 006)
6. Démakro (222)
7. Dila-Broukro (364)
8. Dila-Kouakoukro (417)
9. Djédou-Ahounzè (461)
10. Djédou-Kpli (378)
11. Komo (342)
12. Koukroutié (771)
13. Koumambo (371)
14. Kpli-Yébouessou (503)
15. M'gbokouakoukro (157)
16. N'douakro (501)
17. Pinikro (91)
18. Takra-Adiékro (535)
19. Takra-Kongodjan (354)
20. Takra-Mangouakro (518)
21. Totokro (360)
22. Zagbla (188)
23. Zanikro (881)
24. Delakro (669)
25. Gossoli-Konankro (233)
26. Pokou-Yaokro (426)
27. Abey-Ahougnassou (202)
28. Abey-Kouadiokro (291)
29. Adiébonou (285)
30. Baméla (512)
31. Botro (10 006)
32. Démakro (222)
33. Dila-Broukro (364)
34. Dila-Kouakoukro (417)
35. Djédou-Ahounzè (461)
36. Djédou-Kpli (378)
37. Komo (342)
38. Koukroutié (771)
39. Koumambo (371)
40. Kpli-Yébouessou (503)
41. M'gbokouakoukro (157)
42. N'douakro (501)
43. Pinikro (91)
44. Takra-Adiékro (535)
45. Takra-Kongodjan (354)
46. Takra-Mangouakro (518)
47. Totokro (360)
48. Zagbla (188)
49. Zanikro (881)
50. Delakro (669)
51. Gossoli-Konankro (233)
52. Pokou-Yaokro (426)
53. Tionankro (299)
