= Sidi Tiémoko Touré =

Ivorian politician

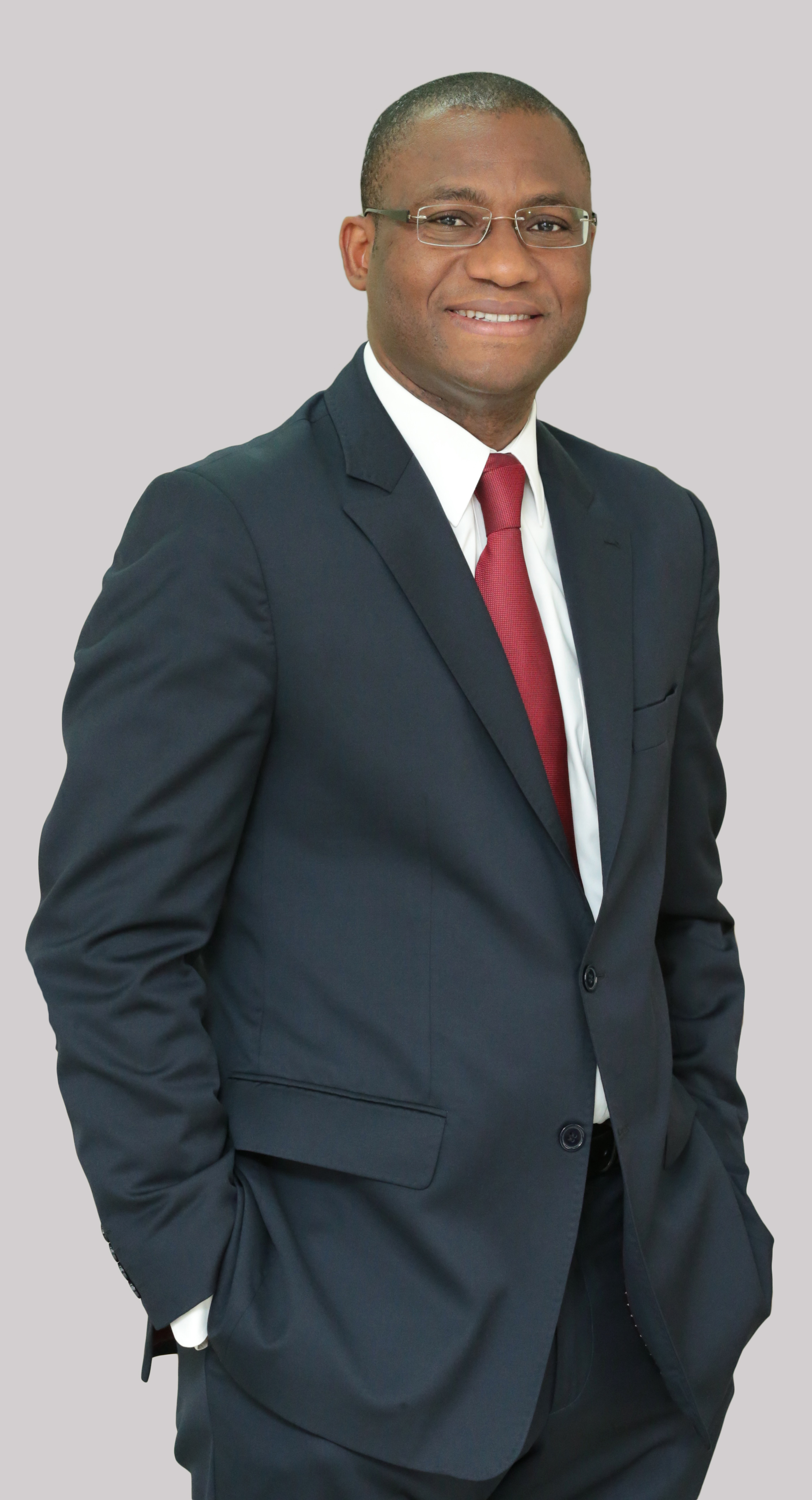
- Sidi Tiémoko Touré

Ivorian Minister of Animal and Fisheries Resources
- Incumbent
- Assumed office 6 April 2021
- President: Alassane Ouattara
- Prime Minister: Patrick Achi
- Preceded by: Dosso Moussa

Ivorian Minister of Communication and Media Government spokesperson
- In office 10 July 2018 – 6 April 2021
- President: Alassane Ouattara
- Prime Minister: Amadou Gon Coulibaly
- Preceded by: Bruno Koné

Minister of Youth Promotion, Youth Employment and Civic Service
- In office 12 January 2016 – 4 July 2018
- President: Alassane Ouattara
- Prime Minister: Daniel Kablan Duncan; Amadou Gon Coulibaly
- Succeeded by: Mamadou Touré

Minister Delegate to the President of the Republic, in charge of Youth Promotion and Youth Employment
- In office 13 May 2015 – 6 January 2016
- President: Alassane Ouattara
- Prime Minister: Daniel Kablan Duncan
- Preceded by: Alain Lobognon

Personal details
- Party: RDR
- Education: Paris Center for Diplomatic and Strategic Studies (CEDS)

Sidi Tiémoko Touré is an Ivorian politician, current Minister of Animal and Fisheries Resources.

== Biography ==
Sidi Tiémoko Touré is the current Ivorian Minister of Fisheries and Animal Resources. He took office on April 6, 2021 under Patrick Achi as Prime Minister. Sidi Tiémoko Touré comes from the Béoumi district, where he served as deputy from 2016 to 2021.

=== Academic background ===
Born to a housewife and a journalist, Sidi Tiémoko Touré is a graduate of the École Militaire Préparatoire Technique (EMPT) of Bingerville, the Lycée Technique d’Abidjan (LTA), and the l’Institut National Polytechnique Houphouët- Boigny of Yamoussoukro (Ex-INSET). He also holds a certificate from the MUST program (Management of Strategic Units) of the Hautes Études Commerciales (HEC) in Paris and the Centre d’Étude Diplomatique et Stratégique (CEDS) in Paris.

As a commercial engineer, he also holds a master's degree in Management and Business Administration from INSTEC (Institut National Supérieur des Techniques Commerciales) and a master's degree in Marketing and Communication from École de Commerce et de Gestion.

=== Professional life ===
He began his professional career in the private sector. This led him first to the Société Ivoirienne des Emballages Métalliques, then to the Société de Commercialisation de Matériel Électriques, as well as Schneider Electric of West and Central Africa.

== Political career ==
=== First steps in politics ===
Sidi Tiémoko Touré began his political career with the Rassemblement des Républicains (RDR) in 1994, the year the party was created. With the First Secretary General of the Party, the late Djéni Kobina, he contributed to the establishment and implementation of the youth branch, namely the Rassemblement des Jeunes Républicains (RJR).

In 1994, he became President of the RJR for Cocody-Aghien. Two years later, he became interim President of the National Executive Bureau of the same organization.

In 2006, Alassane OUATTARA, then President of the RDR, appointed him as Chief of Staff until 2011. Following his accession to the supreme magistracy, he became the Chief of Staff of the President of the Republic, HEM. In this capacity, he was also a member of the National Security Council of Côte d'Ivoire, until 2015.

=== Entry into the Government ===
He joined the government in May 2015 as Minister Delegate to the President of the Republic, in charge of Youth Promotion and Employment. He was reinforced in his functions in January 2016, as Minister of Youth Promotion, Youth Employment and Civic Service in the government led by Daniel Kablan Duncan.

In July 2018, under the Amadou Gon Coulibaly II Government, Sidi Tiémoko Touré was appointed Minister of Communication and Media and designated Government Spokesperson. On August 3, 2020, he was reappointed to the same position in the Hamed Bakayoko Government.

When Prime Minister Patrick Achi formed his first government in April 2021, he appointed Sidi Tiémoko Touré as Minister of Fisheries and Animal Resources.

=== National Assembly ===
Sidi Tiémoko Touré was the Deputy of the Rassemblement des Houphouétiste pour la Démocratie et la Paix (RHDP) of the electoral district of Ando-Kekrenou, Béoumi and Kondrobo, communes and sub-prefectures, during the 2016 – 2021 legislature.

=== International Network ===
In 1998, he was President of the Organization of the Liberal Youth of Côte d'Ivoire (OJLCI). From 2003-2007, he became the President of the Organization of the African Liberal Youth (OJLA), then a member of the board of the International Federation of Liberal and Radical Youth (IFLRY), before serving as Treasurer of Liberal International between 2012 and 2013.

== Bibliography ==
Sidi Tiemoko Touré is also an author. He has published two books: the first entitled "Alassane Ouattara et les Jeunes, le temps des Possibles" a collection of testimonies and tributes to the one he considers his mentor and his "father"; and the second entitled "Alassane Ouattara, aux portes de l’Emergence 2011-2020" a book that highlights the record of the President since he took office in 2011 until 2020.

== Awards ==
As the officer of the Ivorian National Order, Sidi Tiemoko Touré is also Commander of the Order of Merit of Communication and Commander of Order of Agricultural Merit in Côte d'Ivoire.
