= Koffi-Amonkro =

- Town and sub-prefecture
- Location in Ivory Coast
- Coordinates: 7°28′N 3°58′W
- Country: Ivory Coast
- District: Lacs
- Region: Iffou
- Department: Prikro

Population (2014)
  - Total: 11,893
- Time zone: UTC+0 (GMT)

Koffi-Amonkro is a town in east-central Ivory Coast. It is a sub-prefecture of Prikro Department in Iffou Region, Lacs District.

Koffi-Amonkro was a commune until March 2012, when it became one of 1,126 communes nationwide that were abolished.

In 2014, the population of the sub-prefecture of Koffi-Amonkro was 11,893.

== Villages ==
The 16 villages of the sub-prefecture of Koffi-Amonkro and their population in 2014 are:

1. Aboua-Comoékro (528)
2. Adi-Ekrakro (631)
3. Adikankro (845)
4. Adikro (777)
5. Akanangbo (508)
6. Anzan-Kouamékro (780)
7. Donguikro (850)
8. Flamonkro (412)
9. Gbangbo-N'dakro (734)
10. Koffi-Amonkro (2,500)
11. Koffié-Kpri (1,043)
12. Kouamé-Bossinkro (439)
13. Kouamé-Koffikro (487)
14. Kouassikro-Kan (720)
15. Kouassikro-Pri (439)
16. Yabouakikro (200)
