= N'Guessankro =

N'Guessankro may refer to:

- N'Guessankro, Lacs, a sub-prefecture of Bongouanou Department, Moronou Region, Lacs District, Ivory Coast
- N'Guessankro, Vallée du Bandama, a sub-prefecture of Béoumi Department, Gbêkê Region, Vallée du Bandama District, Ivory Coast
