= Ayaou-Sran =

- Town and sub-prefecture
- Location in Ivory Coast
- Coordinates: 7°38′N 5°27′W
- Country: Ivory Coast
- District: Vallée du Bandama
- Region: Gbêkê
- Department: Sakassou

Population (2014)
  - Total: 17,713
- Time zone: UTC+0 (GMT)

Ayaou-Sran is a town in central Ivory Coast. It is a sub-prefecture of Sakassou Department in Gbêkê Region, Vallée du Bandama District.

Ayaou-Sran was a commune until March 2012, when it became one of 1,126 communes nationwide that were abolished.

In 2014, the population of the sub-prefecture of Ayaou-Sran was 17,713.

== Villages ==
The three villages of the sub-prefecture of Ayaou-Sran and their population in 2014 are:

1. Ayaou-Sokpa (9,206)
2. Sran-Bélakro (6,054)
3. Sran-Bondossou (2,453)
