= Bounda =

- Town and sub-prefecture
- Location in Ivory Coast
- Coordinates: 7°37′N 4°44′W
- Country: Ivory Coast
- District: Vallée du Bandama
- Region: Gbêkê
- Department: Bouaké

Population (2014)
  - Total: 10,088
- Time zone: UTC+0 (GMT)

Bounda is a town in central Ivory Coast. It is a sub-prefecture of Bouaké Department in Gbêkê Region, Vallée du Bandama District. The town is about two kilometres north of the border of Lacs District.

Bounda was a commune until March 2012, when it became one of 1,126 communes nationwide that were abolished.

In 2014, the population of the sub-prefecture of Bounda was 10,088.

== Villages ==
The 14 villages of the sub-prefecture of Bounda and their population in 2014 are:

1. Assekakro (255)
2. Bopri (512)
3. Bouakro (585)
4. Bounda (1,383)
5. Kouadianikro (1,082)
6. Kouakou-Kouadiokro (611)
7. Langba Bokohou (918)
8. Languira (440)
9. N'doumou Kouassikro (960)
10. Pindikro (1,264)
11. Pronou (594)
12. Sokouamekro (569)
13. Yapikro (366)
14. Yeguebo (549)
