= Ouffouédiékro =

- Village
- Location in Ivory Coast
- Coordinates: 6°56′N 5°8′W
- Country: Ivory Coast
- District: Yamoussoukro
- Department: Attiégouakro
- Sub-prefecture: Lolobo
- Time zone: UTC+0 (GMT)

Ouffouédiékro is a village in central Ivory Coast. It is in the sub-prefecture of Lolobo in the Attiégouakro Department of the Autonomous District of Yamoussoukro.

Ouffouédiékro was a commune until March 2012, when it became one of 1,126 communes nationwide that were abolished.
