= Toumodi-Sakassou =

- Town and sub-prefecture
- Location in Ivory Coast
- Coordinates: 7°25′N 5°37′W
- Country: Ivory Coast
- District: Vallée du Bandama
- Region: Gbêkê
- Department: Sakassou

Population (2014)
  - Total: 4,429
- Time zone: UTC+0 (GMT)

Toumodi-Sakassou is a town in central Ivory Coast. It is a sub-prefecture of Sakassou Department in Gbêkê Region, Vallée du Bandama District.

Toumodi-Sakassou was a commune until March 2012, when it became one of 1,126 communes nationwide that were abolished.

In 2014, the population of the sub-prefecture of Toumodi-Sakassou was 4,429.

== Villages ==
The two villages of the sub-prefecture of Toumodi-Sakassou and their population in 2014 are:

1. Kongo (2,002)
2. Toumodi-Sakassou (2,427)
