= Krofoinsou =

Krofoinsou Krofensou
- Town and sub-prefecture
- Location in Ivory Coast
- Coordinates: 7°57′N 5°15′W
- Country: Ivory Coast
- District: Vallée du Bandama
- Region: Gbêkê
- Department: Botro

Population (2014)
  - Total: 11,948
- Time zone: UTC+0 (GMT)

Krofoinsou (also spelled Krofensou) is a town in central Ivory Coast. It is a sub-prefecture of Botro Department in Gbêkê Region, Vallée du Bandama District.

Krofoinsou was a commune until March 2012, when it became one of 1,126 communes nationwide that were abolished.

In 2014, the population of the sub-prefecture of Krofoinsou was 11,948.

== Villages ==
The 14 villages of the sub-prefecture of Krofoinsou and their population in 2014 are:

1. Allakro (183)
2. Ballékro (370)
3. Kouabouhansou (359)
4. Kouakou Krémékro (511)
5. Krofoinsou (2,031)
6. Lougbonou-Totokrakro (681)
7. Namouékoungba (595)
8. N'gatta-Kongouékro (417)
9. N'gorankro (526)
10. N'guessan-Kankro (1,407)
11. Plahankro (843)
12. Pliké-Somolo (554)
13. Pliké-Totokro (2,699)
14. Tiéviessou (772)
