= Anianou =

Anianou Agnianou
- Town and sub-prefecture
- Location in Ivory Coast
- Coordinates: 7°41′N 3°46′W
- Country: Ivory Coast
- District: Lacs
- Region: Iffou
- Department: Prikro

Population (2014)
  - Total: 5,814
- Time zone: UTC+0 (GMT)

Anianou (also spelled Agnianou) is a town in east-central Ivory Coast. It is a sub-prefecture of Prikro Department in Iffou Region, Lacs District. The border with Zanzan District is two kilometres east of the town.

Anianou was a commune until March 2012, when it became one of 1,126 communes nationwide that were abolished.

In 2014, the population of the sub-prefecture of Anianou was 5,814.

== Villages ==
The eight villages of the sub-prefecture of Anianou and their population in 2014 are:

1. Affounvassou (354)
2. Akorablékro (220)
3. Anianou (1,776)
4. Attoumabo (602)
5. Koffikpinkro (344)
6. Kotobo (1,433)
7. N'zuéfoufoué (486)
8. Pédéoua (599)
