= Attiégouakro =

- Town and sub-prefecture
- Location in Ivory Coast
- Coordinates: 6°46′N 5°7′W
- Country: Ivory Coast
- District: Yamoussoukro
- Department: Attiégouakro

Population (2014)
  - Total: 12,250
- Time zone: UTC+0 (GMT)

Attiégouakro is a town in central Ivory Coast. Since 2009 it has been the seat of and a sub-prefectures of Attiégouakro Department, Yamoussoukro Autonomous District.

Attiégouakro was a commune until March 2012, when it became one of 1,126 communes nationwide that were abolished.

Villages in the sub-prefecture include Labokro and Morokinkro.
