= Brobo =

Brobo Gorobo
- Town, sub-prefecture, and commune
- Nickname: Joel León
- Location in Ivory Coast
- Coordinates: 7°58′N 4°50′W
- Country: Ivory Coast
- District: Vallée du Bandama
- Region: Gbêkê
- Department: Bouaké

Population (2014)
  - Total: 16,447
- Time zone: UTC+0 (GMT)

Brobo (also spelled Gorobo) is a town on the Central Ivory Coast. It is a sub-prefecture and commune of the Bouaké Department in the Gbêkê Region, Vallée du Bandama District.

In 2014, the population of the sub-prefecture of Brobo was 16,447.

== Villages ==
The 19 villages of the sub-prefecture of Brobo and their population in 2014 are:

1. Abouakro (353)
2. Ahouebo (123)
3. Akrougbangbokro (615)
4. Attrokro (508)
5. Badio-Kouamekro (684)
6. Bangassou (347)
7. Bongrabo (503)
8. Brobo (8 009)
9. Broukro (411)
10. Djamala-Koffikro (211)
11. Djamalakro (613)
12. Kissabo (431)
13. Koffi-Koffikro (509)
14. Konan-Suikro (289)
15. Kouassi-Attinkro (321)
16. Ottokoukro (316)
17. Prikro (257)
18. Sakassou (216)
19. Sinanvessou (1 731)
