= Kondrobo =

- Town and sub-prefecture
- Location in Ivory Coast
- Coordinates: 7°50′N 5°45′W
- Country: Ivory Coast
- District: Vallée du Bandama
- Region: Gbêkê
- Department: Béoumi

Population (2014)
  - Total: 10,197
- Time zone: UTC+0 (GMT)

Kondrobo is a town in central Ivory Coast. It is a sub-prefecture of Béoumi Department in Gbêkê Region, Vallée du Bandama District. The border with Woroba District is three kilometres northwest of town.

Kondrobo was a commune until March 2012, when it became one of 1,126 communes nationwide that were abolished.

In 2014, the population of the sub-prefecture of Bodokro was 28,502.

== Villages ==
The 34 villages of the sub-prefecture of Bodokro and their population in 2014 are:

1. Abikro (675)
2. Agba-Kouassikro (513)
3. Ahokokro (927)
4. Aka-Koffikro (308)
5. Alloukrou-Yakro (172)
6. Angbékro (388)
7. Angoua-Kouamékro (503)
8. Appobinou (650)
9. Babroukro (798)
10. Bodokro (4 139)
11. Bouakro (475)
12. Dibiékro (172)
13. Dibinou (517)
14. Kokotikro (459)
15. Kolikro-Ahoungnanou (946)
16. Konankro (318)
17. Kongossou-N'dri-Koffikro (997)
18. Kouakou-Bakakro (366)
19. Péténou (1,141)
20. Tionankansi (581)
21. Agba-Kouassikro (513)
22. Agbanou-Djoukoukro (624)
23. Akomiankro (187)
24. Allékro (2,966)
25. Assakro (1,191)
26. Goli-Kpangbassou (1,444)
27. Guienzoukro (1,030)
28. Kongodjan (1,427)
29. Kouakoukro (363)
30. N'dakro (512)
31. N'dri-Kouakoukro (799)
32. Pli-Akakro (1,396)
33. Safoukro (303)
34. Zangokro (1,215)
