= Prikro =

- Town, sub-prefecture, and commune
- Location in Ivory Coast
- Coordinates: 7°38′N 3°59′W
- Country: Ivory Coast
- District: Lacs
- Region: Iffou
- Department: Prikro

Population (2014)
  - Total: 33,242
- Time zone: UTC+0 (GMT)

Prikro is a town in east-central Ivory Coast. It is a sub-prefecture of and the seat of Prikro Department in Iffou Region, Lacs District. Prikro is also a commune. Bouaké is 50 kilometres to the west.

In 2014, the population of the sub-prefecture of Prikro was 33,242.

== Villages ==
The 25 villages of the sub-prefecture of Prikro and their population in 2014 are:

1. Abédéni (1 323)
2. Babrassou (1 088)
3. Badessankro (455)
4. Bahérémi (563)
5. Bétié (1 200)
6. Bofoinbo (377)
7. Katéman-N'guessankro (754)
8. Konandi-N'dakro (1 128)
9. Krakoukro (366)
10. N'godjou (705)
11. Ouatti (647)
12. Prikro (7 590)
13. Agbakro (865)
14. Babakro (1 631)
15. Djamdjankro (381)
16. Djonkro (1 417)
17. Farakro (1 081)
18. Gbrakro (3 056)
19. Konandikro (1 670)
20. Lendékro (2 276)
21. Linguézan (1 274)
22. Péré (619)
23. Promokro (680)
24. Siaho (697)
25. Yaokro (1 399)
