= N'Djébonouan =

- Town, sub-prefecture, and commune
- Location in Ivory Coast
- Coordinates: 7°31′N 5°4′W
- Country: Ivory Coast
- District: Vallée du Bandama
- Region: Gbêkê
- Department: Bouaké

Population (2014)
  - Total: 30,821
- Time zone: UTC+0 (GMT)

N'Djébonouan is a town in central Ivory Coast. It is a sub-prefecture and commune of Bouaké Department in Gbêkê Region, Vallée du Bandama District.

In 2014, the population of the sub-prefecture of N'Djébonouan was 30,821.

== Villages ==
The 47 villages of the sub-prefecture of N'Djébonouan and their population in 2014 are

1. Ablekro (179)
2. Adjekro (726)
3. Afferi-Senango-Konankro (358)
4. Akpuibo (797)
5. Behoukro (388)
6. Bledi (825)
7. Bokassou (377)
8. Bouakro (265)
9. Djebonoua (3 648)
10. Gblessou (321)
11. Kankonou (238)
12. Kannouan (507)
13. Koblenouan (287)
14. Komabo (479)
15. Kouadio Akakakro (235)
16. Kouakou-Oussoukro (505)
17. Kouaprikro (96)
18. N'djebonouan Village (891)
19. Sarakakro (752)
20. Tola-Tanoukro (507)
21. Adjouassou (571)
22. Aougnansou (156)
23. Assengou (511)
24. Assiélou-Broukonankro (50)
25. Assouakro (998)
26. Attakro (308)
27. Attohou (213)
28. Gomo (513)
29. Katiénou (1 114)
30. Koffikro (910)
31. Kondoukro (503)
32. Konzo (1 210)
33. Kouadio-Prikro (621)
34. Kouassiblé-Djèkro (506)
35. Lengbré (3 127)
36. Logbakro (603)
37. Lokassou (713)
38. Mébo (275)
39. N'douakro (254)
40. Niangban (965)
41. Pétessou (540)
42. Plango (643)
43. Saa Pokou Andokro (321)
44. Sémoukro (377)
45. Sessékro (1 077)
46. Tanou Sakassou (374)
47. Toungbokro (987)
