= Kondossou =

- Town and sub-prefecture
- Location in Ivory Coast
- Coordinates: 7°43′N 4°30′W
- Country: Ivory Coast
- District: Lacs
- Region: Iffou
- Department: M'Bahiakro

Population (2014)
  - Total: 11,320
- Time zone: UTC+0 (GMT)

Kondossou is a town in east-central Ivory Coast. It is a sub-prefecture of M'Bahiakro Department in Iffou Region, Lacs District. The border of Vallée du Bandama District is 1.5 kilometres west of the town.

Kondossou was a commune until March 2012, when it became one of 1,126 communes nationwide that were abolished.

In 2014, the population of the sub-prefecture of Kondossou was 11,320.

== Villages ==
The 15 villages of the sub-prefecture of Kondossou and their population in 2014 are:

1. Akafou-N'drikro (423)
2. Akakro (1,229)
3. Aouma Broukro (642)
4. Attokro (1,628)
5. Bandamankro (340)
6. Dabokria (426)
7. Dadiékro (788)
8. Komenan-Koffikro (343)
9. Komenankro (554)
10. Kondossou (1,405)
11. Kouadio-Amanikro (398)
12. Kouassikro2 (983)
13. Kpakpanou (904)
14. Pongo-Koffikro (483)
15. Touré-Makari (774)
