= N'Guessankro, Vallée du Bandama =

N'Guessankro
- Town and sub-prefecture
- Location in Ivory Coast
- Coordinates: 8°0′N 5°26′W
- Country: Ivory Coast
- District: Vallée du Bandama
- Region: Gbêkê
- Department: Béoumi

Population (2014)
  - Total: 13,968
- Time zone: UTC+0 (GMT)

N'Guessankro is a town in central Ivory Coast. It is a sub-prefecture of Béoumi Department in Gbêkê Region, Vallée du Bandama District.

N'Guessankro was a commune until March 2012, when it became one of 1,126 communes nationwide that were abolished.

In 2014, the population of the sub-prefecture of N'Guessankro was 13,986.

== Villages ==
The 17 villages of the sub-prefecture of N'Guessankro and their population in 2014 are:

1. Adjokro (712)
2. Adohoussou (1,474)
3. Agbayansi (243)
4. Ahoulikro (615)
5. Angouakro (465)
6. Kissikro (376)
7. Konanblékro (645)
8. Kongokro (473)
9. Kongossou-Kouadiokro (989)
10. Kongoti (721)
11. Kouadio-Finkro (506)
12. Messoukro (1,194)
13. Minambo (1,112)
14. Myan-Gokro (1,801)
15. N'guessankro (1,276)
16. Ouangali (528)
17. Plibo (856)
