= Lolobo, Vallée du Bandama =

Lolobo
- Town and sub-prefecture
- Location in Ivory Coast
- Coordinates: 7°44′N 5°23′W
- Country: Ivory Coast
- District: Vallée du Bandama
- Region: Gbêkê
- Department: Béoumi

Population (2014)
  - Total: 8,880
- Time zone: UTC+0 (GMT)

Lolobo is a town in central Ivory Coast. It is a sub-prefecture of Béoumi Department in Gbêkê Region, Vallée du Bandama District.

Lolobo was a commune until March 2012, when it became one of 1,126 communes nationwide that were abolished.

In 2014, the population of the sub-prefecture of Lolobo was 8,880.

== Villages ==
The 13 villages of the sub-prefecture of Lolobo and their population in 2014 are:

1. Agbanou (1,090)
2. Ahounzé (1,235)
3. Ahouzé-Kouadiokro (593)
4. Alloko-Sakassou (774)
5. Appani-Mangouakro (173)
6. Assékro (671)
7. Diéribanouan (588)
8. Drimbo (796)
9. Kongola (222)
10. Kuindjanda (876)
11. N'zengouanou (699)
12. Samoikro (281)
13. Lolobo (882)
