= Languibonou =

- Town and sub-prefecture
- Location in Ivory Coast
- Coordinates: 7°42′N 5°16′W
- Country: Ivory Coast
- District: Vallée du Bandama
- Region: Gbêkê
- Department: Botro

Population (2014)
  - Total: 22,867
- Time zone: UTC+0 (GMT)

Languibonou is a town in central Ivory Coast. It is a sub-prefecture of Botro Department in Gbêkê Region, Vallée du Bandama District.

Languibonou was a commune until March 2012, when it became one of 1,126 communes nationwide that were abolished.

In 2014, the population of the sub-prefecture of Languibonou was 22,867.

== Villages ==
The 32 villages of the sub-prefecture of Languibonou and their population in 2014 are:

1. Abolé Kouassikro (326)
2. Abolikro (2,736)
3. Akproabo (536)
4. Andokro Kouakou (685)
5. Angokoun Kpangbassou (520)
6. Angoua Yaokro (478)
7. Aougnanfoutou (1,041)
8. Assan Kouassikro (174)
9. Assiéblénou (642)
10. Assinzé (545)
11. Bouakro (221)
12. Boukébo (2,287)
13. Gbangaoukan (547)
14. Gbangaou-Kpli (454)
15. Gbéhéké (558)
16. Golikro (365)
17. Katokossou (584)
18. Kimoukro (349)
19. Klémékro (1,482)
20. Kondéhinou (752)
21. Kouadio Bonou (246)
22. Kouakoublékro (433)
23. Kouamé Yaokro (497)
24. Languibonou (1,089)
25. Languikro (300)
26. Lokanoua (368)
27. Lossinkro (474)
28. Ouessenzué (565)
29. Sahébo (552)
30. Sangrobo (873)
31. Saoundi (1,393)
32. Yrassuénou (795)
