= Dibri-Assirikro =

Dibri-Assirikro Dibri-Asrikro
- Town and sub-prefecture
- Location in Ivory Coast
- Coordinates: 7°35′N 5°10′W
- Country: Ivory Coast
- District: Vallée du Bandama
- Region: Gbêkê
- Department: Sakassou

Population (2014)
  - Total: 16,153
- Time zone: UTC+0 (GMT)

Dibri-Assirikro (also spelled Dibri-Asrikro) is a town in central Ivory Coast. It is a sub-prefecture of Sakassou Department in Gbêkê Region, Vallée du Bandama District.

Dibri-Assirikro was a commune until March 2012, when it became one of 1,126 communes nationwide that were abolished.

In 2014, the population of the sub-prefecture of Dibri-Assirikro was 16,153.

== Villages ==
The 80 villages of the sub-prefecture of Dibri-Assirikro and their population in 2014 are:

1. Affélikro (278)
2. Agbayanouan (287)
3. Ahale-Kpangbassou (278)
4. Akpokro (402)
5. Alle-Kpli (337)
6. Allouboti (251)
7. Angamankro (977)
8. Angan-Kouadiokro (271)
9. Anougblékro (108)
10. Appiakro (458)
11. Bella Ahoukro (91)
12. Bondoukou-Kpli (569)
13. Dibri-Asrikro (1,059)
14. Dila (311)
15. Djongonouan (501)
16. Foto-Kouamekro (963)
17. Gbani-Kokorénou (687)
18. Gbani-Kongossou (313)
19. Gbani-Ya-Sakassou (155)
20. Gogonouan (308)
21. Gohounouan (301)
22. Golibo (307)
23. Kokoni-Sakassou (218)
24. Komokonouan (271)
25. Latani-Akanzakro (169)
26. Mamela Pli Ii (522)
27. Moloukro (603)
28. Nanglais (504)
29. N'dakro (189)
30. N'gandobonou (126)
31. N'guessan Pokoukro (897)
32. Ouassou (407)
33. Sola-Ahougnanou (188)
34. Sola-Boni-Broukro (786)
35. Solla Assamoikro (319)
36. Solla-Mébo (56)
37. Suibonou (378)
38. Affélikro (278)
39. Agbayanouan (287)
40. Ahale-Kpangbassou (278)
41. Akpokro (402)
42. Alle-Kpli (337)
43. Allouboti (251)
44. Angamankro (977)
45. Angan-Kouadiokro (271)
46. Anougblékro (108)
47. Appiakro (458)
48. Bella Ahoukro (91)
49. Bondoukou-Kpli (569)
50. Dibri-Asrikro (1,059)
51. Dila (311)
52. Djongonouan (501)
53. Foto-Kouamekro (963)
54. Gbani-Kokorénou (687)
55. Gbani-Kongossou (313)
56. Gbani-Kouamékro (301)
57. Gbani-Ya-Sakassou (155)
58. Gogonouan (308)
59. Gohounouan (301)
60. Golibo (307)
61. Kokoni-Sakassou (218)
62. Komokonouan (271)
63. Latani-Akanzakro (169)
64. Latani-Kouassiakakro (194)
65. Mamela Pli I (364)
66. Mamela Pli Ii (522)
67. Moloukro (603)
68. Nanglais (504)
69. N'dakro (189)
70. N'gandobonou (126)
71. N'guessan Pokoukro (897)
72. Ouassou (407)
73. Sola-Ahougnanou (188)
74. Sola-Boni-Broukro (786)
75. Solla Assamoikro (319)
76. Solla Bakadjassou (129)
77. Solla-Mébo (56)
78. Sollatengbé (226)
79. Suibonou (378)
80. Ya-Assèkro (94)
