= Ando-Kékrénou =

- Town and sub-prefecture
- Location in Ivory Coast
- Coordinates: 7°31′N 5°35′W
- Country: Ivory Coast
- District: Vallée du Bandama
- Region: Gbêkê
- Department: Béoumi

Population (2014)
  - Total: 12,526
- Time zone: UTC+0 (GMT)

Ando-Kékrénou is a town in central Ivory Coast. It is a sub-prefecture of Béoumi Department in Gbêkê Region, Vallée du Bandama District.

Ando-Kékrénou was a commune until March 2012, when it became one of 1,126 communes nationwide that were abolished.

In 2014, the population of the sub-prefecture of Ando-Kékrénou was 12,526.

== Villages ==
The 13 villages of the sub-prefecture of Ando-Kékrénou and their population in 2014 2014 are:

1. Agonassou 1 (514)
2. Ando Kékrenou (3,345)
3. Bonikro (415)
4. Dékréta (819)
5. Djamala-N'zué (411)
6. Kénéfoué (927)
7. Kouadio-Sakassou (1,020)
8. Kouébo-Kan (422)
9. Linguébo (1,117)
10. Mandanou (1,387)
11. Mangré-Dan (733)
12. Tiessou 1 (620)
13. Tiessou-Démakro (796)
