= Lolobo, Yamoussoukro =

Lolobo
- Town and sub-prefecture
- Location in Ivory Coast
- Coordinates: 6°58′N 5°16′W
- Country: Ivory Coast
- District: Yamoussoukro
- Department: Attiégouakro

Population (2014)
  - Total: 33,267
- Time zone: UTC+0 (GMT)

Lolobo is a town in central Ivory Coast. Since 2009, it has been one of two sub-prefectures of Attiégouakro Department, Yamoussoukro Autonomous District.

Lolobo was a commune until March 2012, when it became one of 1,126 communes nationwide that were abolished.

Villages in the sub-prefecture include Ouffouédiékro.
