= Botro Department =

Coordinates: 7°51′N 5°19′W

Botro Department Département de Botro
- Department
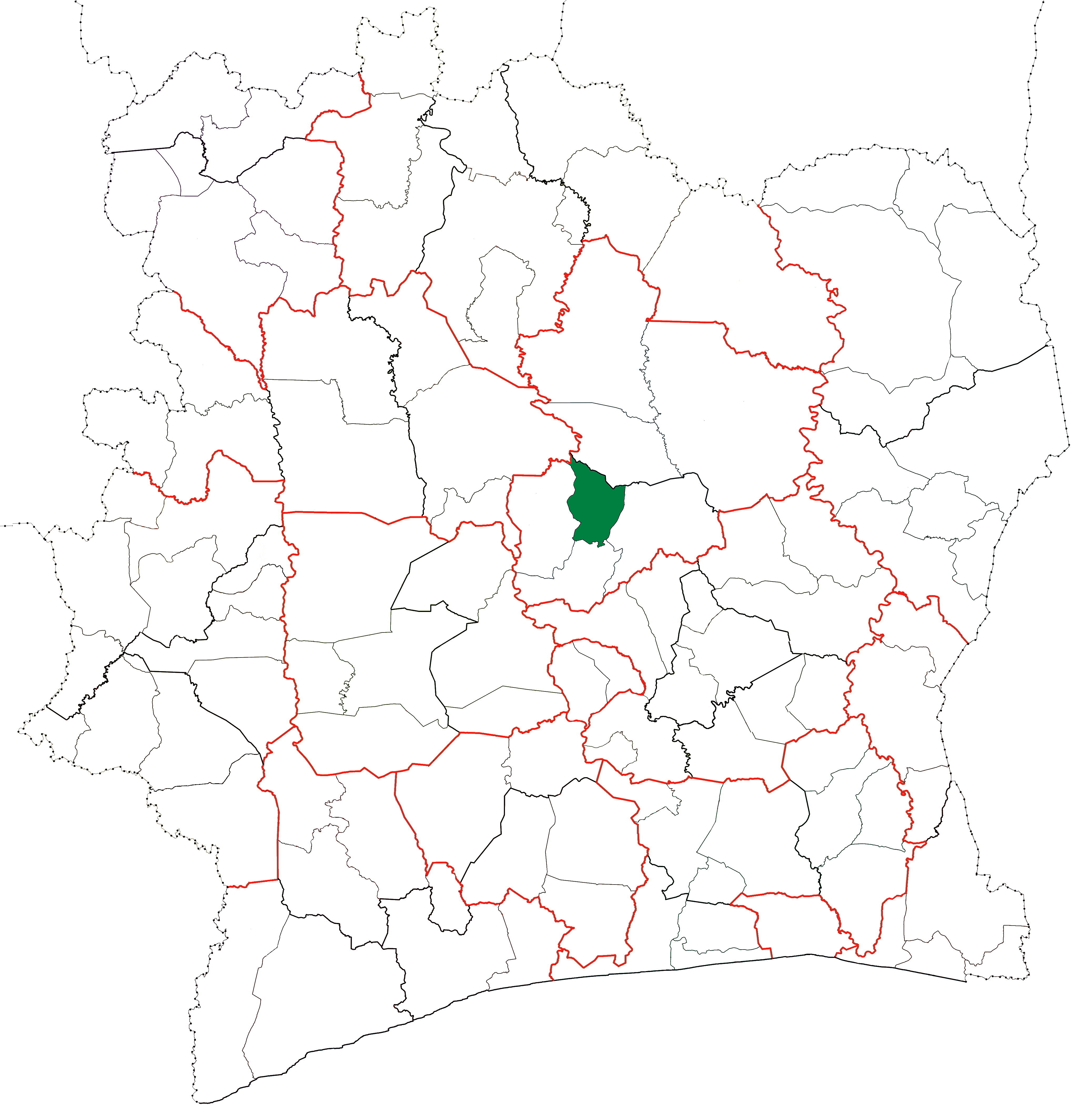
- Location in Ivory Coast. Botro Department has retained the same boundaries since its creation in 2008.
- Country: Ivory Coast
- District: Vallée du Bandama
- Region: Gbêkê
- 2008: Established as a second-level subdivision via a division of Bouaké Dept
- 2011: Converted to a third-level subdivision
- Departmental seat: Botro

Government
  - Prefect: Laminé Coulibaly

Area
  - Total: 1,300 km^{2} (500 sq mi)

Population (2021 census)
  - Total: 117,924
  - Density: 91/km^{2} (230/sq mi)
- Time zone: UTC+0 (GMT)

Botro Department is a department of Gbêkê Region in Vallée du Bandama District, Ivory Coast. In 2021, its population was 117,924 and its seat is the settlement of Botro. The sub-prefectures of the department are Botro, Diabo, Krofoinsou, and Languibonou.

== History ==
Botro Department was created in 2008 as a second-level subdivision via a split-off from Bouaké Department. At its creation, it was part of Vallée du Bandama Region.

In 2011, districts were introduced as new first-level subdivisions of Ivory Coast. At the same time, regions were reorganised and became second-level subdivisions and all departments were converted into third-level subdivisions. At this time, Botro Department became part of Gbêkê Region in Vallée du Bandama District.
