= Sakassou =

- Town, sub-prefecture, and commune
- Location in Ivory Coast
- Coordinates: 7°27′N 5°17′W
- Country: Ivory Coast
- District: Vallée du Bandama
- Region: Gbêkê
- Department: Sakassou

Area
  - Total: 1,100 km^{2} (420 sq mi)

Population (2021 census)
  - Total: 69,386
  - Density: 63/km^{2} (160/sq mi)
  - Town: 13,186
- (2014 census)
- Time zone: UTC+0 (GMT)

Sakassou is a town in central Ivory Coast. It is a sub-prefecture of and the seat of Sakassou Department in Gbêkê Region, Vallée du Bandama District. Sakassou is also a commune.

In 2021, the population of the sub-prefecture of Sakassou was 69,386.

== Villages ==
The 89 villages of the sub-prefecture of Sakassou and their population in 2014 are:

1. Adjékro (511)
2. Adjo-Blessou (503)
3. Adjougouansou (502)
4. Agbanou (618)
5. Ahouè-Broukro (871)
6. Ahouè-Kansi (241)
7. Ahouè-N'zissiessou (222)
8. Ahougnansou (542)
9. Ahoundjo (512)
10. Akété (510)
11. Andobo-Alluibo (1 129)
12. Andobo-Kpangbassou (507)
13. Andofoué-Bonou (1 119)
14. Assabou-Djédjékro (257)
15. Assabou-Kouassikro (247)
16. Assabou-Kpandji-Yaokro (321)
17. Assafou-N'zengouanou (307)
18. Attiakro (342)
19. Aya Sakassou (291)
20. Bowali (64)
21. Broukro (285)
22. Fonvonou-Attienkro (658)
23. Fonvonou-N'gbandobo (71)
24. Gnamiembo (421)
25. Goliblénou (728)
26. Goli-Pokoukro (381)
27. Kahakro (374)
28. Kanango Dan (1 121)
29. Kanango-Ahobè (301)
30. Kanango-Pokoukro (597)
31. Kangré (688)
32. Koffikro (224)
33. Kohounkro (321)
34. Konankro (617)
35. Kongodjan (228)
36. Kouakoukro (211)
37. Koubénou (141)
38. Kpanigokro (164)
39. Kpatanou (704)
40. Kpétèbonou (505)
41. Krofoinsou (251)
42. Lomo-Pô-Kouassikro (214)
43. Lomo-Soukpèbo (513)
44. Longbo-N'gattakro (143)
45. Mangofi (405)
46. N'zokossou-Alloukro (621)
47. N'zuessi (258)
48. Odiahé (597)
49. Sakassou (13 186)
50. Sando (642)
51. Singoli (320)
52. Tayamoinkro (288)
53. Yablassou (1 398)
54. Yablassou Koffikro (505)
55. Aboussou (161)
56. Agokro (186)
57. Akété-Djabo (215)
58. Akrétia (301)
59. Alloko-Djékro (842)
60. Ando-Blé (501)
61. Ando-Dougba (509)
62. Ando-Simbo (389)
63. Ando-Zumé (1 158)
64. Angossé (133)
65. Assandrè (4 329)
66. Assounvouè-Beugrénou (120)
67. Blékro (152)
68. Kanouan (241)
69. Kloko-Sakassou (160)
70. Kokoyalè (102)
71. Konanmoukro (814)
72. Kondrobo (737)
73. Kouassi-Klokro (539)
74. Koumélé (268)
75. Kpato (507)
76. Mandéké-Kahabo (261)
77. Mandéké-Kpon-Kouakoukro (589)
78. N'da-Okoukro (91)
79. N'gbédjo Broukro (147)
80. N'gbédjo-Kongodja (509)
81. Nianda (356)
82. Ninkoumanou (340)
83. Pondossou (179)
84. Sokobo (694)
85. Souafoué-Djacohou (519)
86. Souafouè-Djahan (749)
87. Souafoué-Djéhou (629)
88. Souafouè-Kouékro (513)
89. Ya-Kouakoukro (593)
