= Union of Missionary Baptist Churches in Ivory Coast =

Baptist Christian denomination in the Ivory Coast

- Union des Églises baptistes missionnaires en Côte d'Ivoire
- Abbreviation: UNEBAM-CI
- Classification: Evangelical Christianity
- Theology: Baptist
- Associations: Fédération Évangélique de Côte d’Ivoire, Baptist World Alliance
- Headquarters: Abidjan, Ivory Coast
- Origin: 1979
- Congregations: 300
- Members: 15,000
- Primary schools: 6
- Tertiary institutions: Baptist Seminary of Pastoral and Missionary Training of Toumodi
- Official website: unebamci.org

The Union of Missionary Baptist Churches in Ivory Coast (French: Union des Églises Baptistes Missionnaires en Côte d'Ivoire) is a Baptist Christian denomination, affiliated with the Fédération Évangélique de Côte d'Ivoire and the Baptist World Alliance, in the Ivory Coast. The headquarters is in Abidjan.

== History ==
The Union of Missionary Baptist Churches in Ivory Coast has its origins in an American mission of the International Mission Board in 1966. It was officially founded in 1979 as Baptist Meridional Evangelical Churches in Ivory Coast. In 2006, it had 100 churches and 10,000 members. According to a census published by the association in 2023, it has 300 churches and 15,000 members.

== Schools ==
The convention has 6 primary schools.

It has 1 affiliated theological institute, the Baptist Seminary of Pastoral and Missionary Training of Toumodi.
