= Prikro Department =

Coordinates: 7°38′N 3°59′W

Prikro Department Département de Prikro
- Department
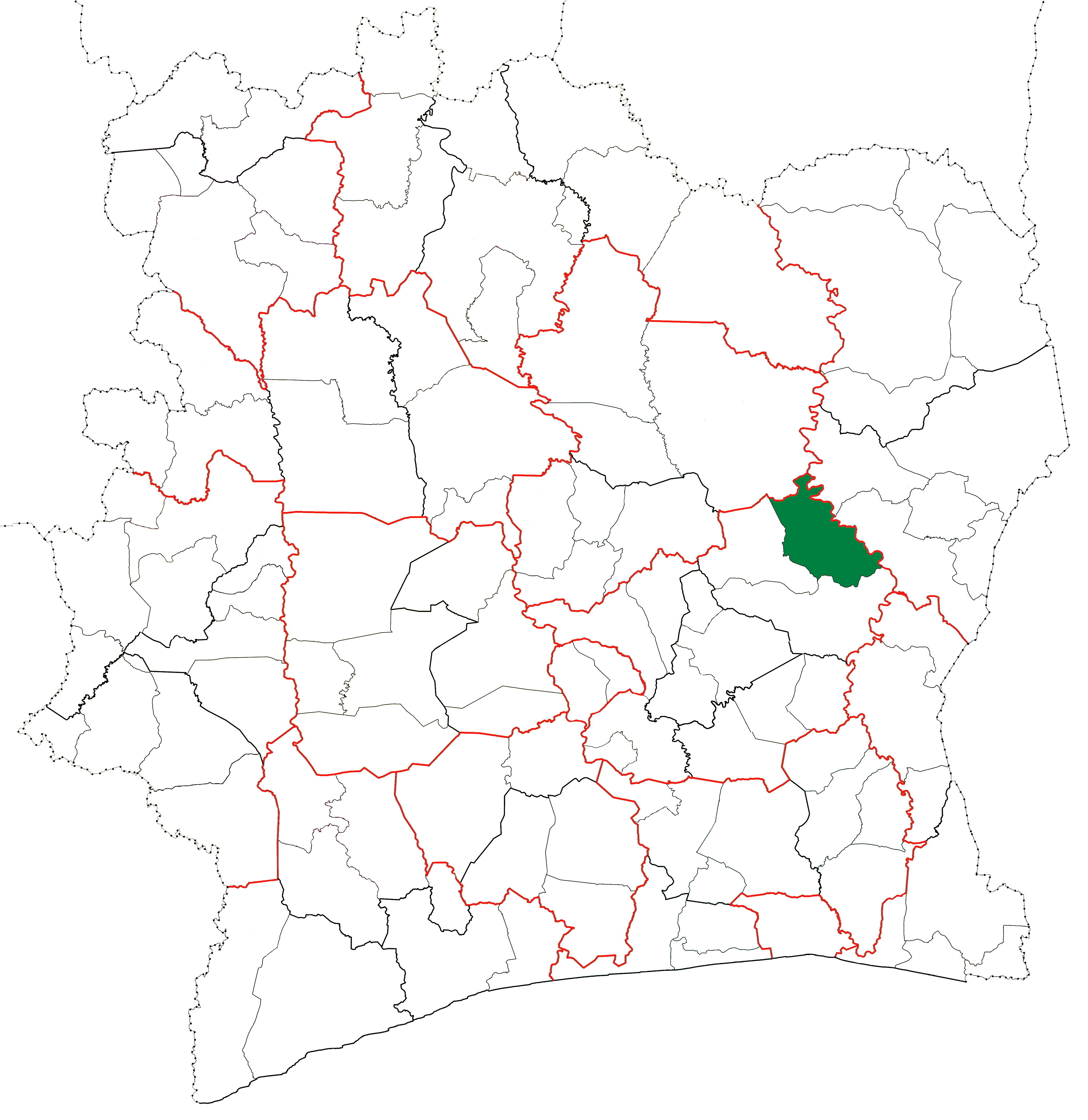
- Location in Ivory Coast. Prikro Department has retained the same boundaries since its creation in 2005.
- Country: Ivory Coast
- District: Lacs
- Region: Iffou
- 2005: Established as a second-level subdivision via a division of M'Bahiakro Dept
- 2011: Converted to a third-level subdivision
- Departmental seat: Prikro

Government
  - Prefect: Marie-Thérèse Guede Mabo

Area
  - Total: 2,530 km^{2} (980 sq mi)

Population (2021 census)
  - Total: 95,595
  - Density: 37.8/km^{2} (97.9/sq mi)
- Time zone: UTC+0 (GMT)

Prikro Department is a department of Iffou Region in Lacs District, Ivory Coast. In 2021, its population was 95,595 and its seat is the settlement of Prikro. The sub-prefectures of the department are Anianou, Famienkro, Koffi-Amonkro, Nafana, and Prikro.

== History ==
Prikro Department was created in 2005 as a second-level subdivision via a split-off from M'Bahiakro Department. At its creation, it was part of N'Zi-Comoé Region.

In 2011, districts were introduced as new first-level subdivisions of Ivory Coast. At the same time, regions were reorganised and became second-level subdivisions and all departments were converted into third-level subdivisions. At this time, Prikro Department became part of Iffou Region in Lacs District.
