= M'Bahiakro =

- Town, sub-prefecture, and commune
- Location in Ivory Coast
- Coordinates: 7°28′N 4°20′W
- Country: Ivory Coast
- District: Lacs
- Region: Iffou
- Department: M'Bahiakro

Population (2014)
  - Total: 49,888
- Time zone: UTC+0 (GMT)

M'Bahiakro is a town in east-central Ivory Coast. It is a sub-prefecture of and the seat of M'Bahiakro Department in Iffou Region, Lacs District. M'Bahiakro is also a commune.

In 2014, the population of the sub-prefecture of M'Bahiakro was 49,888.

== Villages ==
The 43 villages of the sub-prefecture of M'Bahiakro and their population in 2014 are:

1. Abokro (683)
2. Akrifoukro (441)
3. Kouassikro (1 080)
4. M'bahiakro (14 894)
5. N'diorékro (799)
6. Ouokoukro (420)
7. Totokro (336)
8. Yérakro (682)
9. Adi-Yapikro (1 354)
10. Akpouboue Akpoueboue (2 000)
11. Allangouassou (1 505)
12. Amanikro (689)
13. Amankro (853)
14. Angamankro (955)
15. Aoussi -Dossankro (240)
16. Bendékro (470)
17. Bofoin-N'gattakro (873)
18. Boyabo (1 083)
19. Dangoukro (1 411)
20. Dienzoukro (548)
21. Essuikro (605)
22. Kamandoli-Kouassikro (291)
23. Koffi-Yaokro (592)
24. Komiankro (1 825)
25. Kondokro (317)
26. Kondrobo (2 201)
27. Kongokro (379)
28. Kongoti (1 625)
29. Kora- Kissikro (674)
30. Kossé-N'gattakro (875)
31. Kouamé-Akessékro (341)
32. Krimankro-Essuikro (336)
33. Krimankro - N'dénou (785)
34. M'bahia - Yaokro (1 854)
35. M'bahiablékro (210)
36. Nandé-Kroukro (546)
37. N'zi-N'ziblékro (851)
38. Panigokro (1 598)
39. Pobikro (484)
40. Sahébo (592)
41. Séguéla-Koffikro (337)
42. Yapekro (624)
43. Zanhoukro (630)
