= Bouaké =

City in Vallée du Bandama, Ivory Coast

Bouaké Bwake
- City, sub-prefecture, and commune
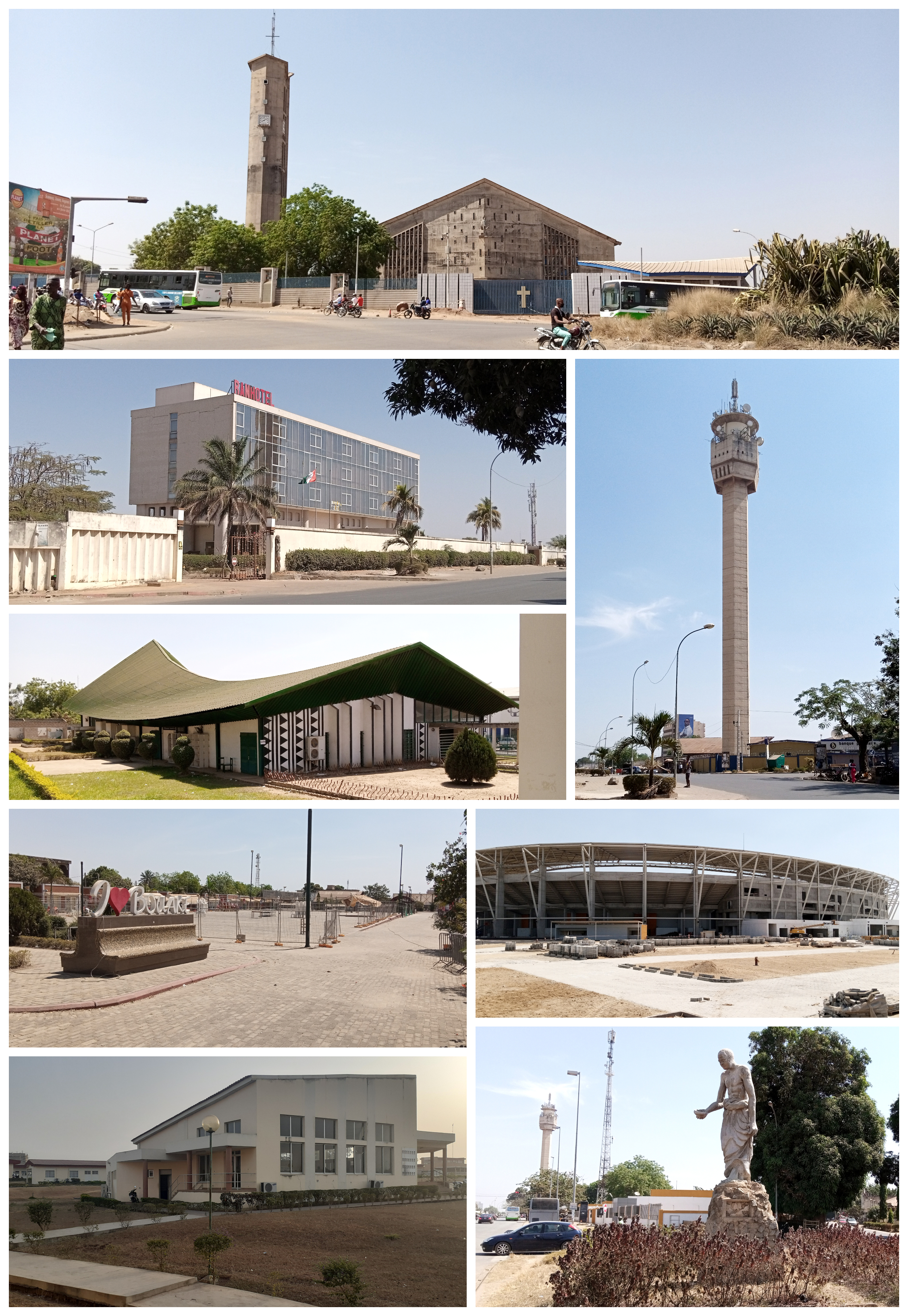
- Bouaké

- Location within Ivory Coast Bouaké (Africa)
- Coordinates: 7°41′N 5°1′W
- Country: Ivory Coast
- District: Vallée du Bandama
- Region: Gbêkê
- Department: Bouaké
- Founded: 1899

Area
  - Total: 1,770 km^{2} (680 sq mi)
  - City: 71.788 km^{2} (27.718 sq mi)
- Elevation: 312 m (1,024 ft)

Population (2021 census)
  - Total: 832,371
  - Rank: 2nd
  - Density: 470/km^{2} (1,220/sq mi)
  - City: 740,000
  - City density: 10,000/km^{2} (27,000/sq mi)
- Time zone: UTC+0 (GMT)
- Website: mairiebke.e-monsite.com

Bouaké (or Bwake, N’ko: ߓߐ߰ߞߍ߫ Bɔ̀ɔkɛ́) is the second-largest city in Ivory Coast, with a population of 740,000 (2021 census). It is the seat of three levels of subdivision—Vallée du Bandama District, Gbêkê Region, and Bouaké Department. The city is located in the central part of Ivory Coast about 50 kilometres (31 mi) northeast of Lake Kossou, the country's largest lake. It is approximately 350 kilometres (220 mi) north of Abidjan on the Abidjan-Niger Railway and about 100 kilometres (62 mi) northeast of Yamoussoukro, the capital of the country.

== Name ==
For the name of the city Bouaké, there are two possible origins:

- The corruption of the chief name Kwa Gbéké that made the foundations of the city of Bouaké.
- The name Bouaké coming from two Baoulé words: "Boua" which means sheep and "Ké" which means dry. Thus it is the place where sheep are dried, as they would have seen Jula drying sheep skins when they arrived in Bouaké.

== Demographics ==
Year	Population
1921	3,600
1945	22 000
1960	60,000
1970	120,000
1975	175,000
1988	329,850
1998	461,618
2014	542,000

== History ==
In the 1800s a group related to the Akan, the Assabou and Baoulé settled in the vicinity of where Bouaké was, initially the village was named Gbèkèkro, so named after the leader of the Baoulé, Gossan Kwa Gbeke and kro meaning town or settlement of.

Bouaké was established as a French military post in 1899 and has been an administrative center since 1914.

French and United Nations peacekeepers currently reside in the city as part of an enforced ceasefire between the rebel-held north and the government-held south. After the attempt to overthrow the president Laurent Gbagbo had failed, the rebel forces FN (forces nouvelles) led by Guillaume Soro made Bouaké their center of control. Subsequently, Bouaké University, opened in 1996, was closed down in September 2002. Financed by Unesco, the university reopened in April, 2005.

On 4 November 2004, governmental forces used Sukhoi-25s to raid the city as an opening movement towards "territorial liberation", according to Captain Jean-Noël Abbey of the Côte d'Ivoire army. Korhogo, 225 kilometres (140 miles) north of Bouaké, was also targeted. In 2014, the population of the sub-prefecture of Bouaké-SP was 71,949.

== Climate ==
Köppen-Geiger climate classification system classifies Bouaké's climate as tropical wet and dry (Aw). The city features a lengthy wet season spanning the months of March through October, and a shorter harmattan-influenced dry season that covers the remaining 4 months. Despite the lengthy wet season, Bouaké does not see the level of rainfall experienced in Abidjan. Bouaké on average sees roughly 1,100 millimetres (43 in) of precipitation annually.

Climate data for Bouaké
Month	Jan	Feb	Mar	Apr	May	Jun	Jul	Aug	Sep	Oct	Nov	Dec	Year
Mean daily maximum °C (°F)	33.0 (91.4)	33.5 (92.3)	33.8 (92.8)	32.7 (90.9)	31.0 (87.8)	29.9 (85.8)	27.8 (82.0)	27.7 (81.9)	28.5 (83.3)	30.1 (86.2)	31.3 (88.3)	31.7 (89.1)	30.9 (87.6)
Daily mean °C (°F)	26.6 (79.9)	27.8 (82.0)	27.8 (82.0)	27.0 (80.6)	26.1 (79.0)	25.0 (77.0)	24.1 (75.4)	23.8 (74.8)	24.3 (75.7)	25.0 (77.0)	25.7 (78.3)	25.7 (78.3)	25.7 (78.3)
Mean daily minimum °C (°F)	20.6 (69.1)	21.8 (71.2)	22.3 (72.1)	22.0 (71.6)	21.7 (71.1)	21.2 (70.2)	20.8 (69.4)	20.9 (69.6)	21.1 (70.0)	21.3 (70.3)	21.3 (70.3)	20.3 (68.5)	21.3 (70.3)
Average precipitation mm (inches)	12.5 (0.49)	40.0 (1.57)	83.8 (3.30)	126.4 (4.98)	123.7 (4.87)	147.2 (5.80)	117.5 (4.63)	128.0 (5.04)	168.1 (6.62)	107.9 (4.25)	30.2 (1.19)	14.6 (0.57)	1,099.9 (43.30)
Mean monthly sunshine hours	226.5	206.6	201.4	194.2	202.3	129.7	97.7	90.6	122.8	174.0	184.7	188.0	2,018.5
Source 1: NOAA
Source 2: Climate Charts (latitude: 07°44'N; longitude: 005°04'W; elevation: 376m)

== Economy ==
Tobacco products, building materials, and textiles are produced, and cotton sisal and rice are processed. Gold, mercury, and manganese are found nearby. The overall economy was shaken during the near decade long rebel rule that started in 2002. Many companies either shut down or relocated to Abidjan, Ivory Coast's coastal economic hub. These events resulted in the 60% reduction in formal employment. For example, the city's biggest textile mill, the Gonfreville Establishment, saw an employment decrease of 1200 workers, an 80% reduction. Economic recovery was slow until the early 2010s. After the State took back control of Bouake after the 2010-2011 election, the economy moved into a state of reconstruction. Roads were repaved after years of neglect, which allowed the transportation of goods to become an easier task. Cash crops such as cotton and cashews started to be transported in higher quantities to be processed in Bouake. Singapore-based Olam opened a cashew processing plant in Bouake in 2012, which accounts for nearly 2400 jobs. The agribusiness as a whole is beginning to turn to its original state before the rebel conflict. Additionally, banks have opened new branches and supermarkets have returned to normal operation. The government is stimulating this regrowth through policies, such as price floors, and projects to increase trade, including the construction of a highway to connect Bouake to the nation's capital, Yamoussoukro.

== Transports ==
The city has the Bouaké Airport located north-west of the city with a 3,300 metres (10,800 ft) runway.

Located on the line of the railway which connects Abidjan to Ouagadougou in Burkina Faso, the city has the Railway Station Bouaké operated by Sitarail.

The roads that connect Bouaké are the A3 and the A8 going clockwise from the north the A3 connects Katiola and with Korhogo on the A12 eastwards with further destinations in Burkina Faso and Mali. Eastwards the A10 starts in Bouaké and connects to Ghana and to Bondoukou via the A1 northwards and Abengourou southwards. The A8 connects to Abengourou northwards on the A1 and Abidjan southwards. A3 Southbound connects to the political capital Yamoussoukro and the economic capital Abidjan. A8 westbound goes to Beoumi and Lake Kossou continuing to Man and Danané with further destinations in Liberia and Guinea.

== Education ==
The Université Alassane Ouattara was founded in 1992.

Primary Schools
Public

- École primaire Publique Zone1

Secondary Schools
Public

- Lycée classique
- Lycée technique
- lycée Djibo Sounkalo (ex lycée Municipal)
- Lycée moderne Belleville

Semi-Public

- Lycée St Michel d'Anyama

Private

- Lycée Saint-Viateur
- Lycée René Descartes (école française)

Public Colleges

- College de jeunes filles
- Collège Moderne TSF
- College moderne de Nimbo (ex COB)
- College G. Koko (ex CEG KOKO)

Private Colleges

- Collège Marie Thérèse Yamousso
- Collège Martin Luther King
- Collège Moderne Saint Jacques
- Collège Victor Hugo
- Collège Ruth Fidèle
- Collège Ouezzin Coulibaly
- Collège Renaissance
- Collège Moderne N'Takpe
- Collège Saint-Viateur
- Collège international chrétien
- Collège Adventiste

== Places of worship ==
The most common places of worship are Muslim mosques. There are also Christian churches and temples : Roman Catholic Archdiocese of Bouaké (Catholic Church), United Methodist Church Ivory Coast (World Methodist Council), Union of Missionary Baptist Churches in Ivory Coast (Baptist World Alliance), Assemblies of God.

== Administration ==
List of mayors of Bouaké since 1960
Date elected	Name	Party
1960	Djibo Sounkalo	PDCI-RDA
1980	Konan Blédou	PDCI-RDA
1985	Konan Blédou	PDCI-RDA
1990	Konan Antoine	PDCI-RDA
1995	Konan Konan Denis	PDCI-RDA
2000	Fanny Ibrahima	RDR

=== Subdivisions ===
The city itself is a sub-prefectures of Bouaké Department; the surrounding suburbs that are outside of the city limits are also organised into a sub-prefecture known as "Bouaké-SP". Bouaké is also a commune.

The subdivision of the city is as follows

North East:- Dougouba, Liberté, Kodiakoffikro, Attienkro, Dar-es-salam 2 and 3, Camp Militaire, Belleville 1 and 2, Sokoura, IDESSA, Kanakro

North West:- Koko, Lycée Municipal, Zone industrielle, Tièrèkro, Gonfreville, Niankoukro, Aéroport, Konankankro, Allokokro, Mamianou, Kamounoukro, Dar-es-salam 1, Tolla Kouadiokro, Beaufort

South East:- Nimbo, Air France 1 2 and 3, N'Gouatanoukro, Kennedy

South West:- N'Gattakro, Ahougnanssou, Broukro 1 and 2, Houphouët-ville, N'Dakro

Center:- Commerce

== Sport ==
The local stadium of Bouaké is the Stade de la Paix (in English, "Stadium of Peace"). It was constructed in 1984 for the 1984 Africa Cup of Nations, and was one of the host stadiums for the 2023 Africa Cup of Nations. Renovation on the stadium started in 2020 in preparation for the event. The renovations increased the stadium's capacity from 35,000 to 40,000 for the event.

The local team is called Bouaké FC and plays in the Stade de la Paix.

People that have represented the Ivorian national football team that were born in Bouaké are the Brothers Kolo Touré and Yaya Toure, Abdul Razak (footballer) and Lassina Diabaté.

== International relations ==
=== Twin towns – Sister cities ===
Bouaké is twinned with:

- Mopti, Mali
- Brescia, Italy
- Beersheba, Israel
- Villeneuve-sur-Lot, France
- Reutlingen, Germany
- Zimnicea, Romania

== Villages ==
The 130 villages of the sub-prefecture of Bouaké-SP and their population in 2014 are:

1. Abou Angankro (173)
2. Adissakassou (271)
3. Adjagbli-Koffikro (119)
4. Affouékro (730)
5. Agbangnassou (978)
6. Agoua-Agankro (231)
7. Agoua-Kongokro (567)
8. Ahodji (829)
9. Akanzakro (1 932)
10. Akoumouadjekro (97)
11. Akpessé (136)
12. Akpla Assoumankro (729)
13. Alloko-Yaokro (123)
14. Allomabo (589)
15. Amanikro (73)
16. Andokro (204)
17. Ando-Sakassou (147)
18. Angamblé-Konankro (250)
19. Angankro (313)
20. Anko-Prikro (246)
21. Assémonblakro (253)
22. Assengoukan (347)
23. Assengoukpli (893)
24. Assoumayaokro (331)
25. Attienkonankro (403)
26. Bendè-Kouassikro (2 061)
27. Boblénou (517)
28. Djamalabo (304)
29. Djétouankro (361)
30. Djongonou (643)
31. Douakankro (493)
32. Fari-Oko (1 173)
33. Godokro (367)
34. Iki (514)
35. Kahankro-Prepressou (1 386)
36. Kaloukro (512)
37. Kékré-Kouakoukro (517)
38. Klosrambo (164)
39. Koblékro (421)
40. Kokangbakro (298)
41. Kokoflétékro (365)
42. Kokokro (178)
43. Kolongonouan (1 013)
44. Kongodékro (1 929)
45. Kongouèkro (381)
46. Kouadio-Miankro (506)
47. Kouakou-Yobouékro (348)
48. Kouakro (516)
49. Kouamekro (332)
50. Kouassiblékro (1 538)
51. Kpangbambo (1 831)
52. Kpokanhankro (386)
53. Kpoti-Takikro (543)
54. Lamgbassou (719)
55. Lokanou (142)
56. Lomibo (348)
57. Mamian (526)
58. Manikro (759)
59. Mébo (1 317)
60. Minankro (115)
61. N'dakro (501)
62. N'drikro (262)
63. N'zuéfoufouénouan (360)
64. Pitiessi (822)
65. Sessénouan (968)
66. Sézénou (411)
67. Suibonou (512)
68. Taligbessou (189)
69. Tanou-Sakassou (820)
70. Totimbo (415)
71. Totokro (357)
72. Tromabo (287)
73. Yapo Kouakoukro (501)
74. Yeboué Kouadiokro (936)
75. Abokro (214)
76. Adiékakankro (336)
77. Afounvasou (842)
78. Ahoussi-Takikro (271)
79. Akafou Kouadikro (61)
80. Akakro (604)
81. Akpatoukro (358)
82. Akrou Kouadiokro (204)
83. Akwaba (411)
84. Allakro (574)
85. Allomanou (916)
86. Amanikro-Prepressou (215)
87. Assan Kouadiokro (226)
88. Assandrè (1 215)
89. Assandrékro (103)
90. Assouman-Diékro (664)
91. Bamoro Baoule (834)
92. Bamoro-Gare (819)
93. Besséri-Takikro (719)
94. Djigbe (1 021)
95. Groubouekro (93)
96. Kangare (569)
97. Kanoukro (671)
98. Karo-Gblobo (896)
99. Koffi Konankro (119)
100. Konankro-Mizron (1 288)
101. Konan-N'guessankro (194)
102. Kondounou (365)
103. Kouabo (627)
104. Kouakou-Miankro (253)
105. Kouakro-Mizron (981)
106. Kouame-Assékro (189)
107. Lama-Amanikro (518)
108. Lattéman-Koffikro (348)
109. Mahounou (295)
110. M'brakro-Dranouan (358)
111. M'brakro-Prepressou (666)
112. M'brenzué (1 192)
113. M'malan-Kouassikro (558)
114. N'dènou (267)
115. N'doua-Kouamékro (230)
116. N'gatta-Sakassou (1 012)
117. N'guessankro (509)
118. Niamoutiekro (251)
119. N'valikro (308)
120. Oko-N'dranouan (1 004)
121. Pokoukro (318)
122. Sibirikro (364)
123. Sokolo (519)
124. Sottikro (366)
125. Tchimou-Assékro (1 123)
126. Tiéplé (957)
127. Toungbakro (189)
128. Toungbossou (189)
129. Yangakro (522)
130. Yebouekro (676)

== Notable people ==
- Mehdi Khalil (born 1991), footballer
