= Sakassou Department =

Coordinates: 7°27′N 5°18′W

Sakassou Department Département de Sakassou
- Department
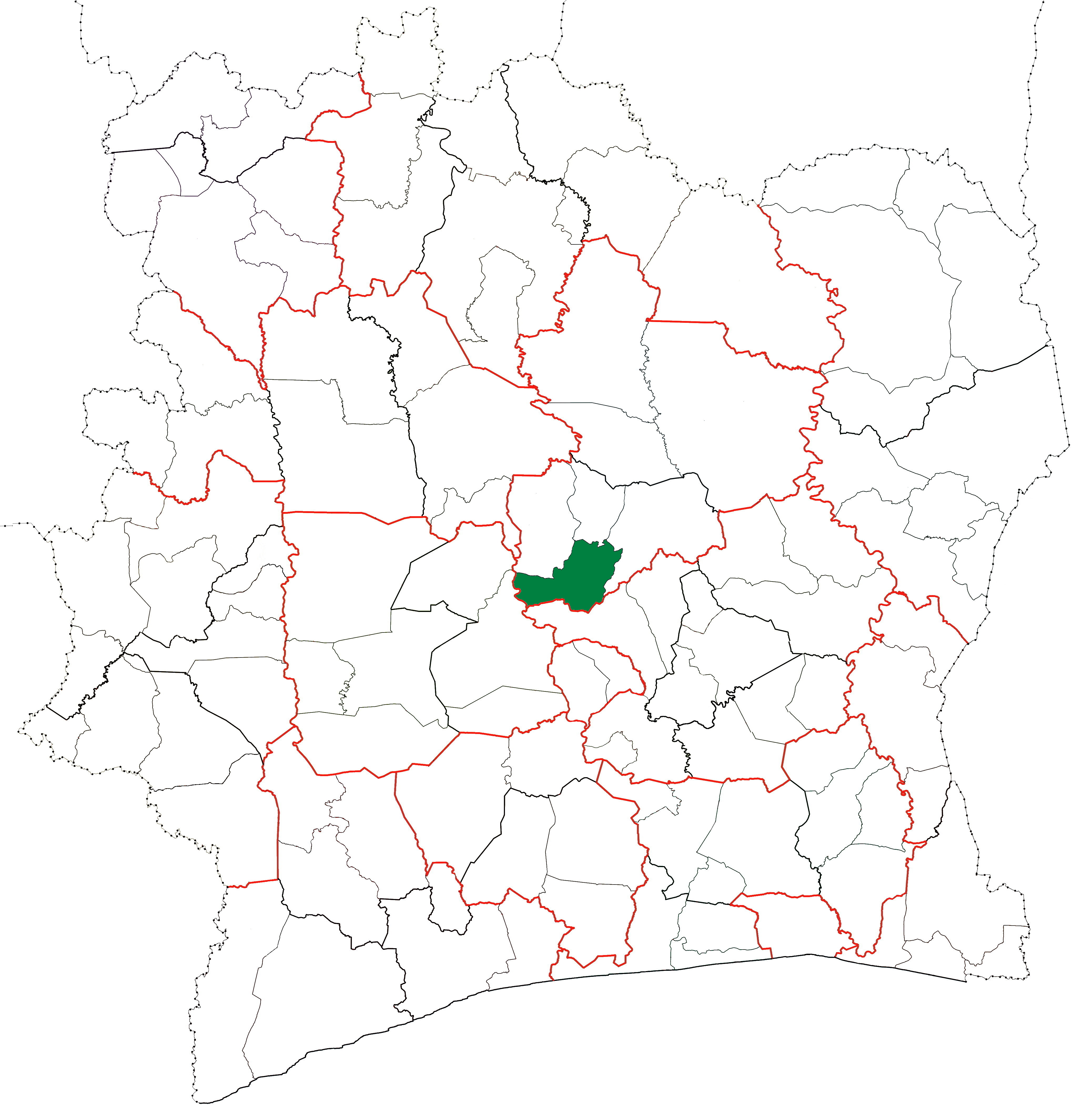
- Location in Ivory Coast. Sakassou Department has retained the same boundaries since its creation in 1988.
- Country: Ivory Coast
- District: Vallée du Bandama
- Region: Gbêkê
- 1988: Established as a first-level subdivision via a division of Bouaké Dept
- 1997: Converted to a second-level subdivision
- 2011: Converted to a third-level subdivision
- Departmental seat: Sakassou

Government
  - Prefect: Kouakou Wiha Ange Tchikaya

Area
  - Total: 1,780 km^{2} (690 sq mi)

Population (2021 census)
  - Total: 108,110
  - Density: 60.7/km^{2} (157/sq mi)
- Time zone: UTC+0 (GMT)

Sakassou Department is a department of Gbêkê Region in Vallée du Bandama District, Ivory Coast. In 2021, its population was 108,110 and its seat is the settlement of Sakassou. The sub-prefectures of the department are Ayaou-Sran, Dibri-Assirikro, Sakassou, and Toumodi-Sakassou.

== History ==
Sakassou Department was created in 1988 as a first-level subdivision via a split-off from Bouaké Department.

In 1997, regions were introduced as new first-level subdivisions of Ivory Coast; as a result, all departments were converted into second-level subdivisions. Sakassou Department was included in Vallée du Bandama Region.

In 2011, districts were introduced as new first-level subdivisions of Ivory Coast. At the same time, regions were reorganised and became second-level subdivisions and all departments were converted into third-level subdivisions. At this time, Sakassou Department became part of Gbêkê Region in Vallée du Bandama District.
