= Attiégouakro Department =

Attiégouakro Department Département d'Attiégouakro
- Department
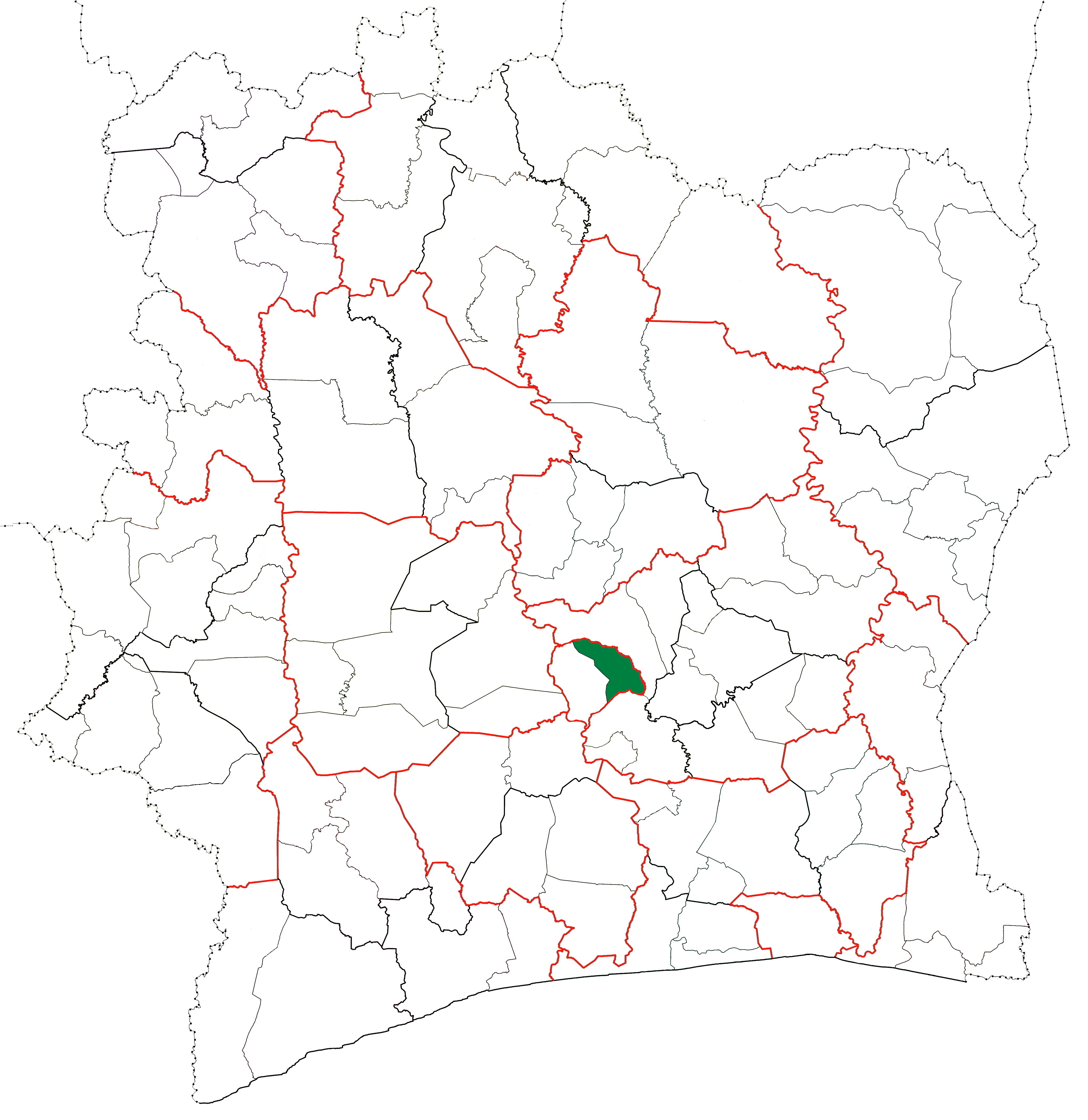
- Location in Ivory Coast. Attiégouakro Department has had these boundaries since its creation in 2009.
- Country: Ivory Coast
- District: Yamoussoukro
- 2009: Established as a second-level subdivision via division of Yamoussoukro Dept
- 2011: Converted to a third-level subdivision
- 2011: Transferred from Lacs Region to Yamoussoukro Autonomous District
- Departmental seat: Attiégouakro

Government
  - Prefect: Brah Julliette Konan

Area
  - Total: 802 km^{2} (310 sq mi)

Population (2021 census)
  - Total: 49,513
  - Density: 61.7/km^{2} (160/sq mi)
- Time zone: UTC+0 (GMT)

Attiégouakro Department is a department of Ivory Coast. It is one of two departments in the Yamoussoukro Autonomous District.

== Population and sub-prefectures ==
In the 2021 census, Attiégouakro Department had a population of 49,513. The department is divided into two sub-prefectures, Attiégouakro and Lolobo.

== History ==
Attiégouakro Department was created as in 2009 as a second-level subdivision when Lac Region's Yamoussoukro Department was divided in two.

In 2011, districts were introduced as new first-level subdivisions of Ivory Coast. At the same time, regions were reorganised and became second-level subdivisions and all departments were converted into third-level subdivisions. At this time, Attiégouakro Department became part of Yamoussoukro Autonomous District, one of two districts in the country with no regions.
