= Béoumi =

- Town, sub-prefecture, and commune
- Location in Ivory Coast
- Coordinates: 7°40′N 5°35′W
- Country: Ivory Coast
- District: Vallée du Bandama
- Region: Gbêkê
- Department: Béoumi

Area
  - Total: 1,130 km^{2} (440 sq mi)

Population (2021 census)
  - Total: 85,600
  - Density: 75.8/km^{2} (196/sq mi)
  - Town: 25,526
- (2014 census)
- Time zone: UTC+0 (GMT)

Béoumi is a town in central Ivory Coast. It is a sub-prefecture of and the seat of Béoumi Department in Gbêkê Region, Vallée du Bandama District. Béoumi is also a commune.

In 2021, the population of the sub-prefecture of Béoumi was 85,600.

== Villages ==
The 54 villages of the sub-prefecture of Béoumi and their population in 2014 are:

1. Akadiafoué (1 167)
2. Aka-Yaokro (421)
3. Assengou (2 019)
4. Assenzé (1 130)
5. Béoumi (25 526)
6. Bélakro (1 388)
7. Akadiafoué (1 167)
8. Aka-Yaokro (421)
9. Assengou (2 019)
10. Assenzé (1 130)
11. Béoumi (25 526)
12. Bélakro (1 388)
13. Diacohou (1 478)
14. Kongonoussou (2 102)
15. Kongossou (1 201)
16. Konsou (2 189)
17. N'dèbo (889)
18. N'dori-Sakassou (387)
19. N'gotran (513)
20. Niambrun (2 082)
21. N'zuéda (832)
22. Ouaouassi (519)
23. Ouaouassi-Démakro (450)
24. Solo (620)
25. Souafouè-Dan (836)
26. Souafouè-Kan (702)
27. Tiendébo (532)
28. Zédé-Kan (1 198)
29. Abayansi (402)
30. Abouakro (1 181)
31. Affotobo (1 978)
32. Assakra (1 281)
33. Assèkro (711)
34. Diéviessou (3 214)
35. Fari-M'babo (739)
36. Fitabro (1 417)
37. Golikro (2 308)
38. Kaabo (854)
39. Kongobo (1 667)
40. Koubébo-Dan (1 128)
41. Koumambo (567)
42. Mangré-Kan (265)
43. Monébo (406)
44. N'zoupri (401)
45. Ouaouassi-M'babo (1 008)
46. Ouengrè (102)
47. Sanhouty (951)
48. Saoulétié (681)
49. Yoboué-N'zué (1 027)
50. Zèdè-Bossi (668)
51. Zèdè-Dianhoun (366)
52. Zédé-Kpambassou (612)
53. Zédé-N'drébo (814)
54. Zédé-Tiesso (546)

== Notable people ==
- Sidi Tiémoko Touré, Minister of Animal and Fisheries Resources
