= Bouaké Department =

Coordinates: 7°41′N 5°1′W

Bouaké Department Département de Bouaké
- Department
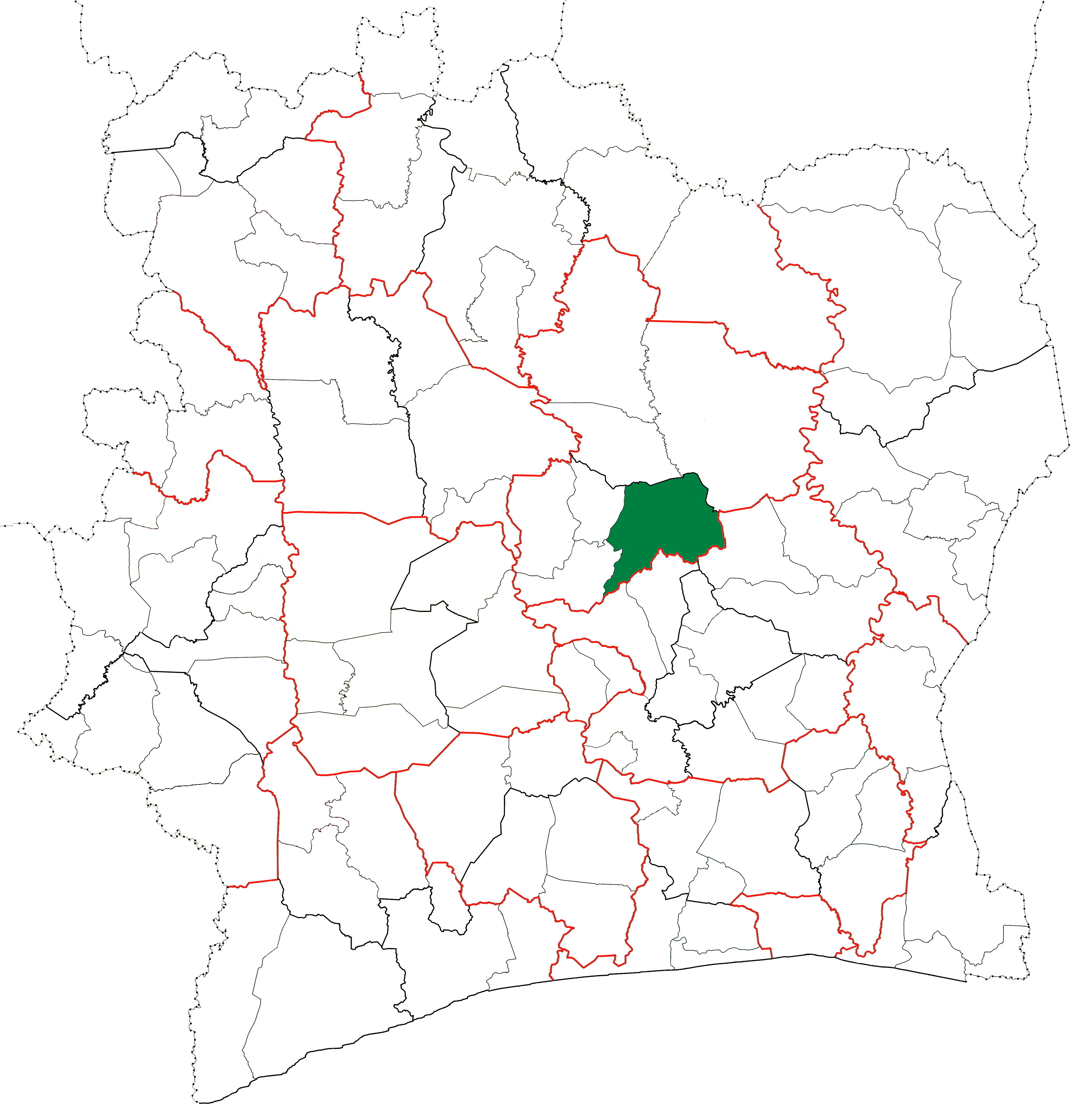
- Location in Ivory Coast. Bouaké Department has had these boundaries since 2008.
- Country: Ivory Coast
- District: Vallée du Bandama
- Region: Gbêkê
- 1969: Established as a first-level subdivision
- 1988: Divided to create Béoumi, M'Bahiakro, Sakassou, Toumodi, and Yamoussoukro Depts
- 1997: Converted to a second-level subdivision
- 2008: Divided to create Botro Dept
- 2011: Converted to a third-level subdivision
- Departmental seat: Bouaké

Government
  - Prefect: Aka Konin

Area
  - Total: 3,390 km^{2} (1,310 sq mi)

Population (2021 census)
  - Total: 931,851
  - Density: 275/km^{2} (712/sq mi)
- Time zone: UTC+0 (GMT)

Bouaké Department is a department of Gbêkê Region in Vallée du Bandama District, Ivory Coast. In 2021, its population was 931,851 making it the second most populous department in the country behind Abidjan. The seat of the department is the city of Bouaké. The sub-prefectures of the department are Bouaké-SP, Bouaké-Ville, Bounda, Brobo, Mamini, and N'Djébonouan.

== History ==
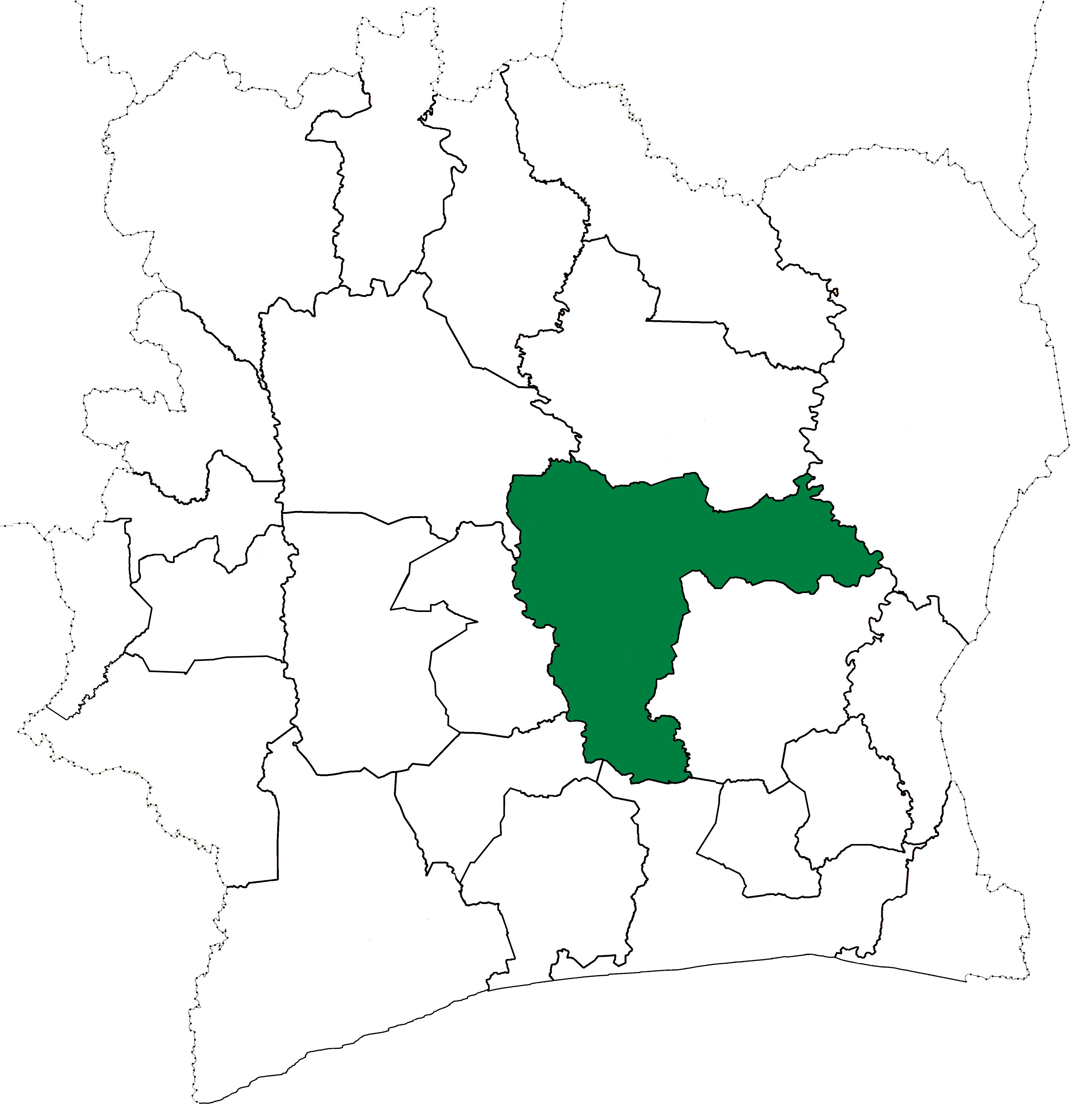
Bouaké Department upon its creation in 1969. It kept these boundaries until 1988, but other departments began to be divided in 1974.

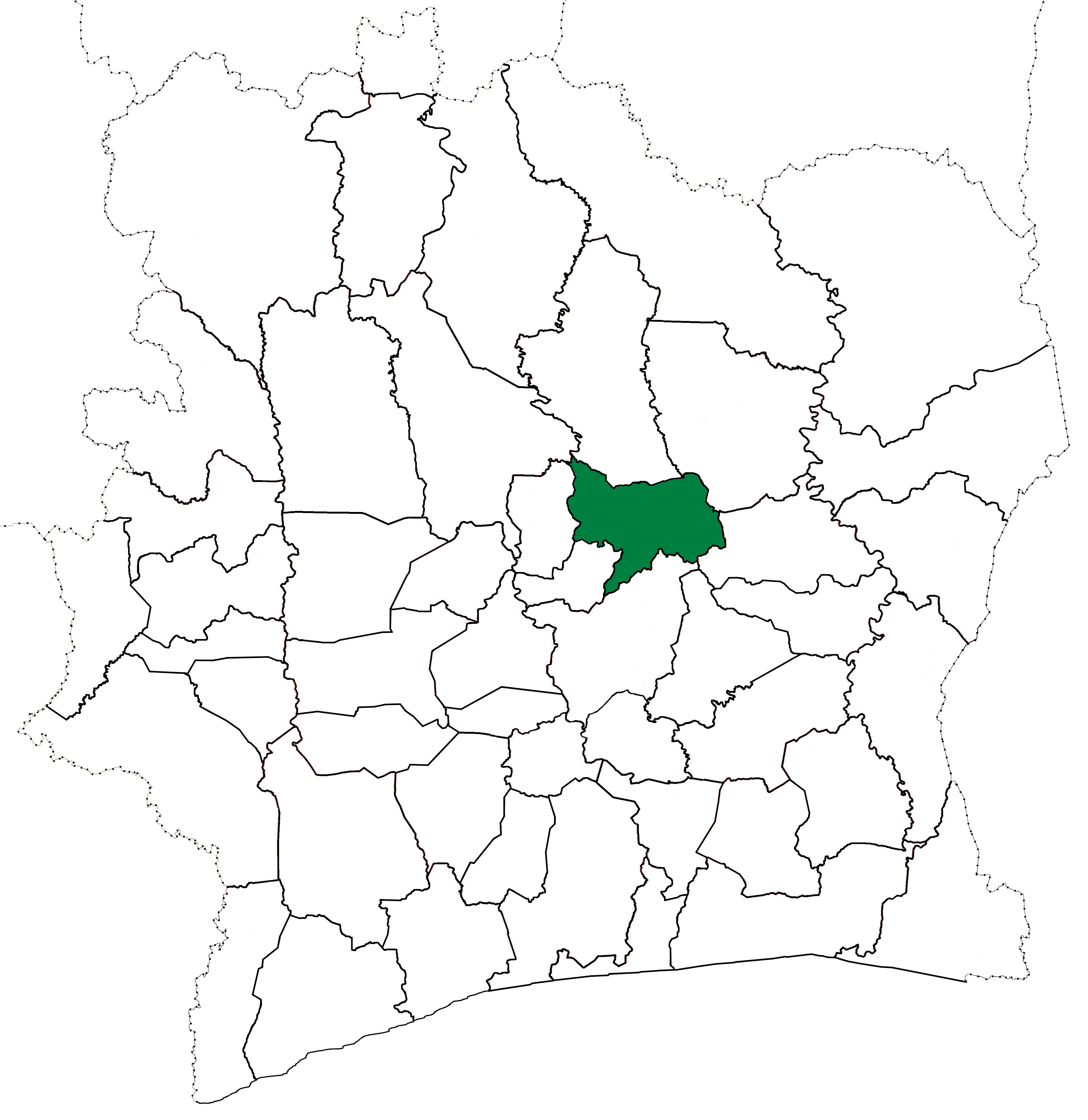
Bouaké Department from 1988 to 2008. (Other subdivision boundaries began to change in 1995.)

Bouaké Department was created in 1969 as one of the 24 new departments that were created to take the place of the six departments that were being abolished. It was created from territory that was formerly part of Centre Department. Using current boundaries as a reference, from 1969 to 1988 the department occupied the following territory: all of Gbêkê Region; all of Bélier Region; all of Yamoussoukro Autonomous District; and all of Iffou Region, with the exception of Daoukro Department.

In 1988, Bouaké Department was split into six parts to create five new departments: Béoumi, M'Bahiakro, Sakassou, Toumodi, and Yamoussoukro.

In 1997, regions were introduced as new first-level subdivisions of Ivory Coast; as a result, all departments were converted into second-level subdivisions. Bouaké Department was included as part of Vallée du Bandama Region.

Bouaké Department was split again in 2008 to create Botro Department.

In 2011, districts were introduced as new first-level subdivisions of Ivory Coast. At the same time, regions were reorganised and became second-level subdivisions and all departments were converted into third-level subdivisions. At this time, Bouaké Department became part of Gbêkê Region in Vallée du Bandama District.
