= M'Bahiakro Department =

Coordinates: 7°28′N 4°20′W

M'Bahiakro Department Département de M'Bahiakro
- Department
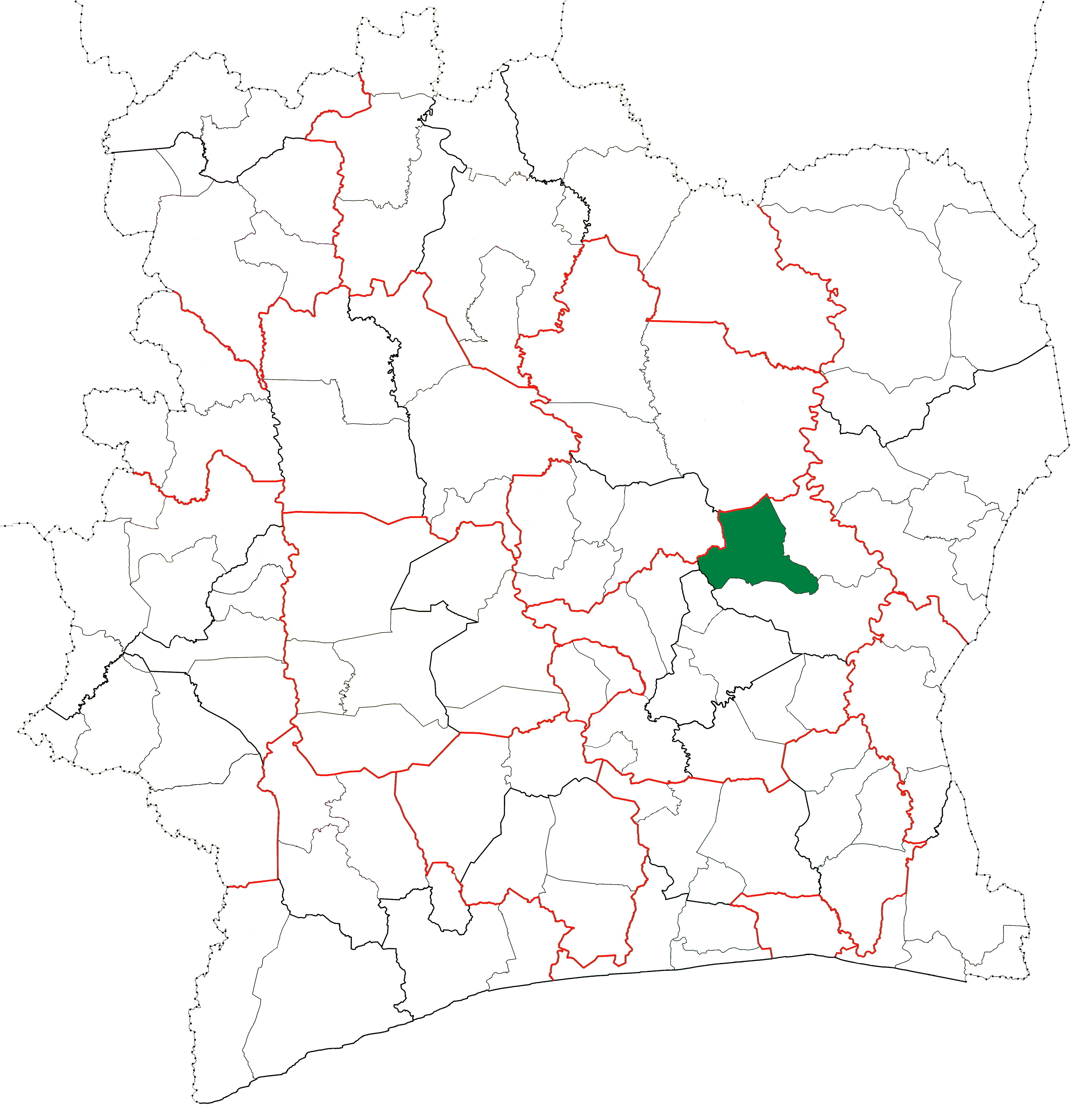
- Location in Ivory Coast. M'Bahiakro Department has had these boundaries since 2005.
- Country: Ivory Coast
- Region: Iffou
- 1985: Established as a first-level subdivision via a division of Bouaké Dept
- 1997: Converted to a second-level subdivision
- 2005: Divided to create Prikro Dept
- 2011: Converted to a third-level subdivision
- 2014: Converted back to a second-level subdivision
- Departmental seat: M'Bahiakro

Government
  - Prefect: Diby Konan

Area
  - Total: 2,560 km^{2} (990 sq mi)

Population (2021 census)
  - Total: 78,369
  - Density: 30.6/km^{2} (79.3/sq mi)
- Time zone: UTC+0 (GMT)

M'Bahiakro Department is a department of Iffou Region in Lacs District, Ivory Coast. In 2021, its population was 78,369 and its seat is the settlement of M'Bahiakro. The sub-prefectures of the department are Bonguéra, Kondossou, and M'Bahiakro.

== History ==
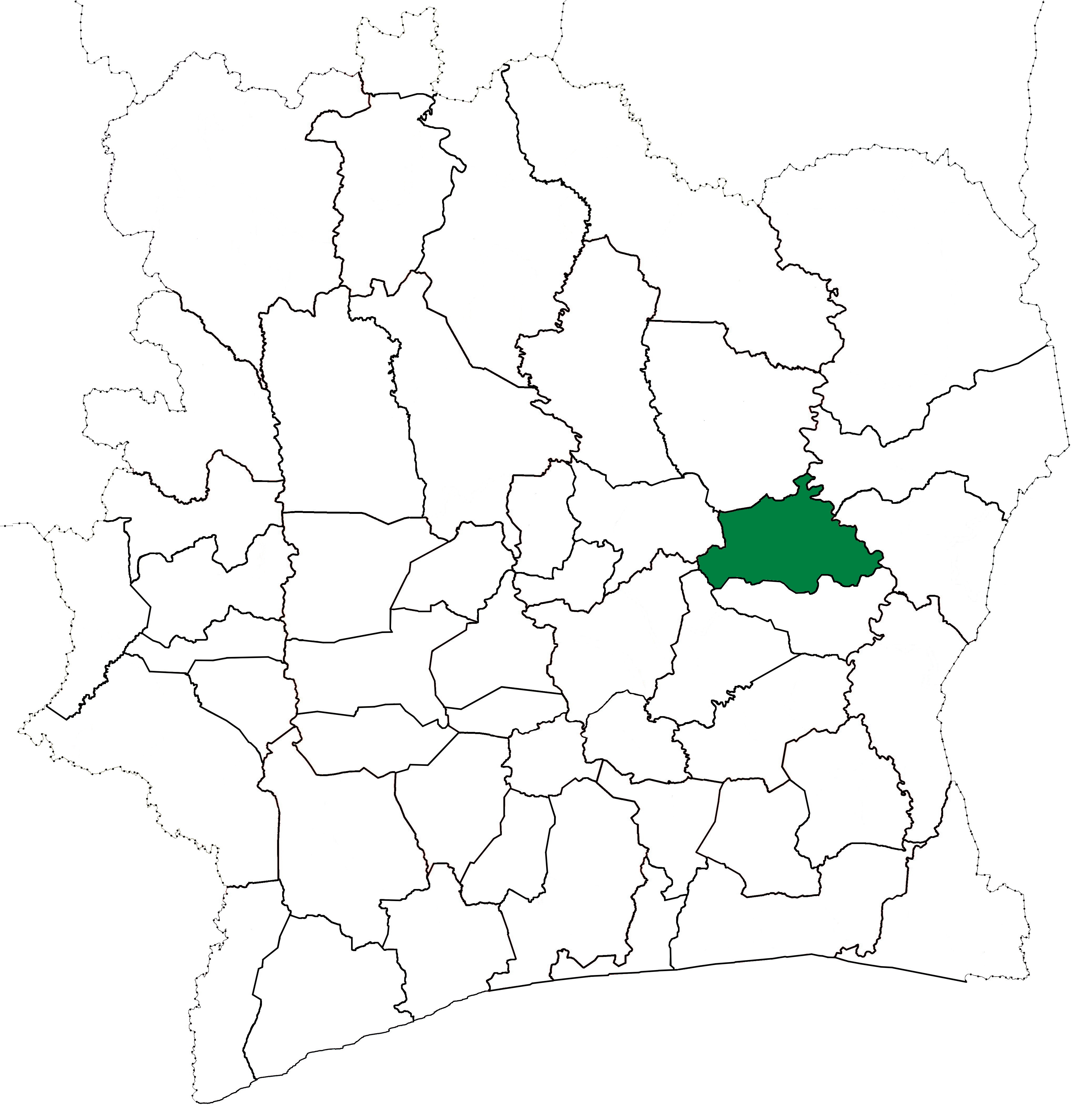
M'Bahiakro Department upon its creation in 1985. It kept these boundaries until 2005, but other subdivision boundary changes began to be made in 1995.

M'Bahiakro Department was created in 1985 as a first-level subdivision via a split-off from Bouaké Department.

In 1997, regions were introduced as new first-level subdivisions of Ivory Coast; as a result, all departments were converted into second-level subdivisions. M'Bahiakro Department was included in N'Zi-Comoé Region.

In 2005, the M'Bahiakro Department was divided in order to create Prikro Department.

In 2011, districts were introduced as new first-level subdivisions of Ivory Coast. At the same time, regions were reorganised and became second-level subdivisions and all departments were converted into third-level subdivisions. At this time, M'Bahiakro Department became part of Iffou Region in Lacs District. Districts were suppressed in 2014.
