= Iffou =

Region of Ivory Coast

Coordinates: 7°15′N 3°52′W

Iffou Region Région de l'Iffou
- Region
- Location of Iffou Region with its departments: Ouellé Department M'Bahiakro Department Prikro Department Daoukro Department
- Country: Ivory Coast
- District: Lacs
- Established: 2011
- Regional seat: Daoukro

Government
  - Prefect: Albert Koffi Akpolleh Kouamé
  - Council President: Koffi Moïse Koumoué

Area
  - Total: 8,870 km^{2} (3,420 sq mi)

Population (2021 census)
  - Total: 378,560
  - Density: 42.7/km^{2} (111/sq mi)
- Time zone: UTC+0 (GMT)

Iffou Region is one of the 31 regions of Ivory Coast. Since its establishment in 2011, it has been one of the regions in Lacs District. The seat of the region is Daoukro, and the region's population in the 2021 census was 378,560.

Iffou is currently divided into four departments: Daoukro, M'Bahiakro, Ouellé, and Prikro.
