= Gbêkê =

Coordinates: 7°41′N 5°1′W

Gbêkê Region Région de Gbêkê Wawlè Region Région du Wawlè
- Region
- Motto: "Union-Paix-Developpement"
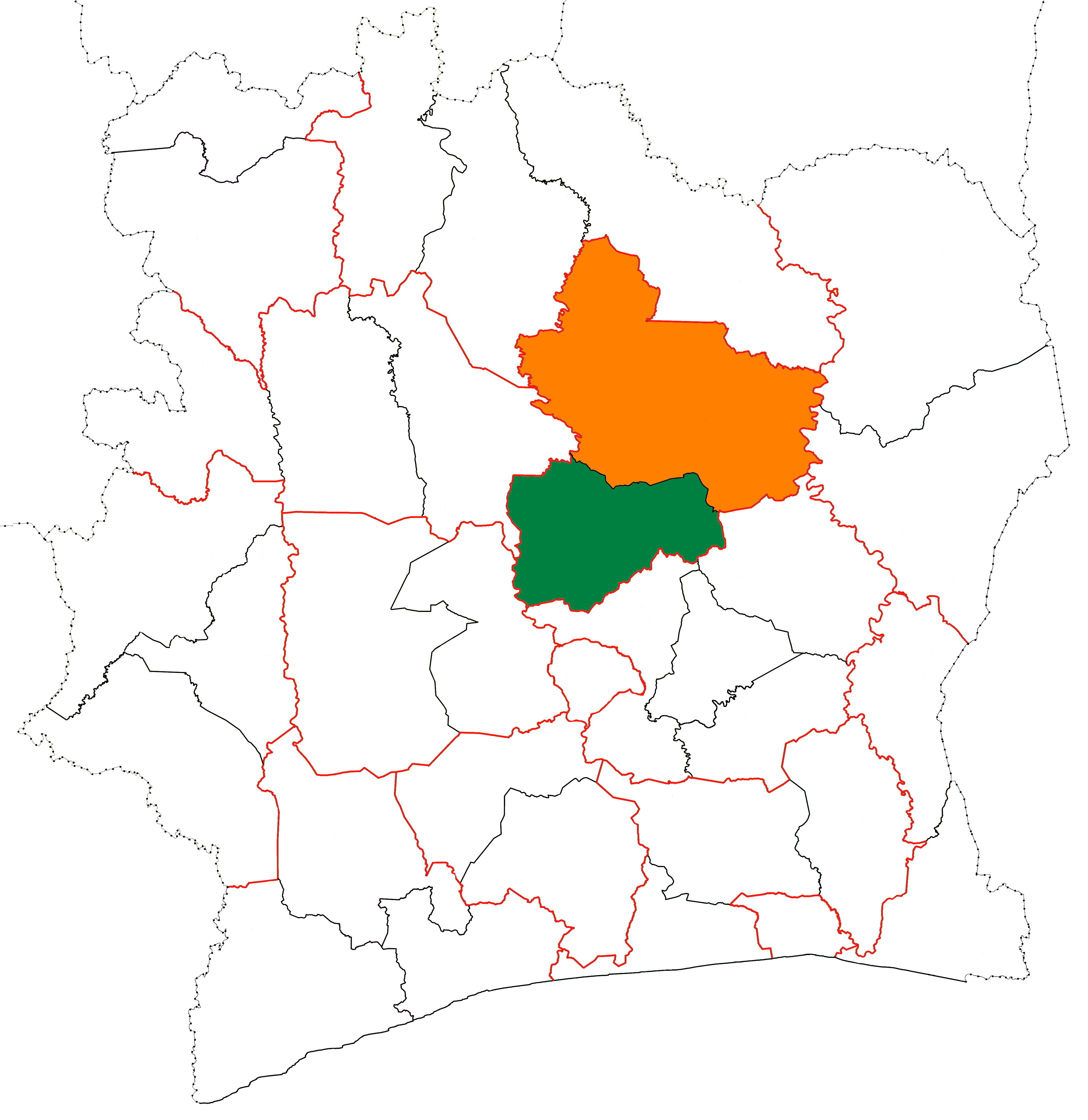
- Location of Gbêkê Region (green) in Ivory Coast and in Vallée du Bandama District
- Country: Ivory Coast
- District: Vallée du Bandama
- Established: 2011
- Regional seat: Bouaké

Government
  - Prefect: Tuo Fonzi
  - Council President: Mangoua Koffi Saraka Jacques

Area
  - Total: 8,990 km^{2} (3,470 sq mi)

Population (2021 census)
  - Total: 1,352,900
  - Density: 150/km^{2} (390/sq mi)
- Time zone: UTC+0 (GMT)

Gbêkê Region (also known as Wawlè Region) is one of the 31 regions of Ivory Coast. Since its establishment in 2011, it has been one of two regions in Vallée du Bandama District. The seat of the region is Bouaké and the region's population in the 2021 census was 1,352,900, making it the third-most populous region of Ivory Coast.

Gbêkê is currently divided into four departments: Béoumi, Botro, Bouaké, and Sakassou.

== Name ==
In the 2011 decree that created the region, Gbêkê was referred to alternatively as the region of "Wawlè".

== Location ==
Gbêkê is located in the north of the country. It borders Hambol, Iffou, Bélier Region, Marahoué and Béré Region.
