= Katimassou =

- Village
- Location in Ivory Coast
- Coordinates: 7°20′N 3°35′W
- Country: Ivory Coast
- District: Lacs
- Region: Iffou
- Department: Daoukro
- Sub-prefecture: Ettrokro
- Time zone: UTC+0 (GMT)

Katimassou is a village in eastern Ivory Coast. It is in the sub-prefecture of Ettrokro, Daoukro Department, Iffou Region, Lacs District. Four kilometres east of the village is the tripoint of Lacs, Zanzan, and Comoé Districts.

Katimassou was a commune until March 2012, when it became one of 1,126 communes nationwide that were abolished.
