= Ouellé Department =

Coordinates: 7°18′N 4°01′W

Ouellé Department Département de Ouellé
- Department
- Location (dark green) in Iffou region (light green) in Ivory Coast. Ouellé Department has retained the same boundaries since its creation in 2020.
- Country: Ivory Coast
- Region: Iffou
- 2020: Established via a division of Daoukro Dept
- Departmental seat: Ouellé

Government
  - Prefect: Nana Soro

Area
  - Total: 1,578 km^{2} (609 sq mi)

Population (2021 census)
  - Total: 56,501
  - Density: 35.81/km^{2} (92.74/sq mi)
- Time zone: UTC+0 (GMT)

Ouellé Department is a department of Iffou Region, Ivory Coast. In 2021, its population was 56,501 and its seat is the settlement of Ouellé. The sub-prefectures of the department are Ouellé, Akpassanou, and Ananda.

== History ==
Ouellé Department was created in 2020 by taking 3 sub-prefectures from the Daoukro Department. Ouellé Department is the most recently created department in Ivory Coast.
