= Zanzansou =

- Village
- Location in Ivory Coast
- Coordinates: 7°23′N 3°53′W
- Country: Ivory Coast
- District: Lacs
- Region: Iffou
- Department: Daoukro
- Sub-prefecture: Samanza
- Time zone: UTC+0 (GMT)

Zanzansou is a village in eastern Ivory Coast. It is in the sub-prefecture of Samanza, Daoukro Department, Iffou Region, Lacs District.

Zanzansou was a commune until March 2012, when it became one of 1,126 communes nationwide that were abolished.
