= Ettrokro =

Ettrokro Etroukro
- Town, sub-prefecture, and commune
- Location in Ivory Coast
- Coordinates: 7°15′33″N 3°45′43″W
- Country: Ivory Coast
- District: Lacs
- Region: Iffou
- Department: Daoukro

Population (2014)
  - Total: 16,492
- Time zone: UTC+0 (GMT)

Ettrokro (also spelled Etroukro) is a town in east-central Ivory Coast. It is a sub-prefecture and commune of Daoukro Department in Iffou Region, Lacs District.

In 2014, the population of the sub-prefecture of Ettrokro was 16,492.

== Villages ==
The 11 villages of the sub-prefecture of Ettrokro and their population in 2014 are:

1. Akakro (560)
2. Assa-Comoékro (1,839)
3. Comoé-N'goua (1,250)
4. Ettien-Kouadiokro (3,043)
5. Ettrokro (3,173)
6. Katimassou (1,932)
7. Koffikro (347)
8. Kokossou (689)
9. Konien-Kouamékro (1,018)
10. Lalassou (1,786)
11. Tchoumoukro (855)
