= Samanza =

- Town and sub-prefecture
- Location in Ivory Coast
- Coordinates: 7°30′N 3°35′W
- Country: Ivory Coast
- District: Lacs
- Region: Iffou
- Department: Daoukro

Population (2014)
  - Total: 10,260
- Time zone: UTC+0 (GMT)

Samanza is a town in eastern Ivory Coast. It is a sub-prefecture of Daoukro Department in Iffou Region, Lacs District. The border of Zanzan District is 200 metres northwest of the town.

Samanza was a commune until March 2012, when it became one of 1,126 communes nationwide that were abolished.

In 2014, the population of the sub-prefecture of Samanza was 10,260.

== Villages ==
The nine villages of the sub-prefecture of Samanza and their population in 2014 are:

1. Agba-Tanoukro (137)
2. Aka-Comoékro (1,654)
3. Akpokro (332)
4. Ekra-Kpinkro (357)
5. Nouffoukro (550)
6. Ouakabessi (833)
7. Samanza (2 546)
8. Tiokonou (850)
9. Zanzansou (3 001)
