= N'Gattakro =

N'Gattakro Ngatakro
- Town and sub-prefecture
- Location in Ivory Coast
- Coordinates: 7°4′N 3°45′W
- Country: Ivory Coast
- District: Lacs
- Region: Iffou
- Department: Daoukro

Population (2014)
  - Total: 13,480
- Time zone: UTC+0 (GMT)

N'Gattakro (also spelled Ngatakro) is a town in east-central Ivory Coast. It is a sub-prefecture of Daoukro Department in Iffou Region, Lacs District. The town is 16 kilometres to the west of the border of Comoé District.

N'Gattakro was a commune until March 2012, when it became one of 1,126 communes nationwide that were abolished.

In 2014, the population of the sub-prefecture of N'Gattakro was 13,480.

== Villages ==
The five villages of the sub-prefecture of N'Gattakro and their population in 2014 are:

1. Adjékro (4,151)
2. Akakro (2,081)
3. Amoikonkro (2,183)
4. N'gattakro (3,767)
5. N'tèkléfè (1,298)
