= Ananda, Ivory Coast =

Ananda
- Town and sub-prefecture
- Location in Ivory Coast
- Coordinates: 6°57′N 4°18′W
- Country: Ivory Coast
- District: Lacs
- Region: Iffou
- Department: Daoukro

Population (2014)
  - Total: 12,020
- Time zone: UTC+0 (GMT)

Ananda is a town in east-central Ivory Coast. It is a sub-prefecture of Daoukro Department in Iffou Region, Lacs District.

Ananda was a commune until March 2012, when it became one of 1,126 communes nationwide that were abolished.

In 2014, the population of the sub-prefecture of Ananda was 12,020.

== Villages ==
The 12 villages of the sub-prefecture of Ananda and their population in 2014 are:

1. Alloko-Koffikro (639)
2. Ananda (2,917)
3. Angouakro (2,516)
4. Assabli-Komenankro (955)
5. Assokro 1 (143)
6. Assokro 2 (663)
7. Daigbai-Bayanou (709)
8. Goli-N'zikro (779)
9. Kodia-Essékro (464)
10. Nangokro (846)
11. Potossou (1,200)
12. Yapi-Bonikro (189)
