= Daoukro Department =

Coordinates: 7°15′N 3°52′W

- Location in Ivory Coast.
- Country: Ivory Coast
- District: Lacs
- Region: Iffou
- 1988: Established as a first-level subdivision via a division of Dimbokro Dept
- 1997: Converted to a second-level subdivision
- 2011: Converted to a third-level subdivision
- Departmental seat: Daoukro

Government
  - Prefect: Albert Koffi Akpolleh Kouamé

Area
  - Total: 2,201 km^{2} (850 sq mi)

Population (2021 census)
  - Total: 148,095
  - Density: 67.29/km^{2} (174.3/sq mi)
- Time zone: UTC+0 (GMT)

is a department of Iffou Region in Lacs District, Ivory Coast. In 2021, its population was 148,095 and its seat is the settlement of Daoukro. The sub-prefectures of the department are Daoukro, Ettrokro, N'Gattakro, and Samanza.

== History ==
Daoukro Department was created in 1988 as a first-level subdivision via a split-off from Dimbokro Department.

In 1997, regions were introduced as new first-level subdivisions of Ivory Coast; as a result, all departments were converted into second-level subdivisions. Daoukro Department was included in N'Zi-Comoé Region.

In 2011, districts were introduced as new first-level subdivisions of Ivory Coast. At the same time, regions were reorganised and became second-level subdivisions and all departments were converted into third-level subdivisions. At this time, Daoukro Department became part of Iffou Region in Lacs District.

In 2020, its northwestern part (sub-prefectures of Akpassanou, Ananda, and Ouellé) is taken apart to create the department of Ouellé.
