= Daoukro =

- Town, sub-prefecture, and commune
- Location in Ivory Coast
- Coordinates: 7°3′N 3°58′W
- Country: Ivory Coast
- District: Lacs
- Region: Iffou
- Department: Daoukro

Area
  - Total: 863 km^{2} (333 sq mi)

Population (2021 census)
  - Total: 101,136
  - Density: 117/km^{2} (304/sq mi)
  - Town: 44,342
- (2014 census)
- Time zone: UTC+0 (GMT)

Daoukro is a town in east-central Ivory Coast. It is a sub-prefecture of and the seat of Daoukro Department. It is also the seat of Iffou Region in Lacs District. Daoukro is also a commune.

== Administration ==
A law of 1978 established 27 full-service municipalities in the territory of the country.

List of successive mayors
Date d'élection	Identité	Parti	Qualité	Statut
1980	Henri Konan Bédié	PDCI-RDA	Politician	elected
1985	Andoh Konan Jean	PDCI-RDA	Politician	elected
1990	Andoh Konan Jean	PDCI-RDA	Politician	elected
1995	Andoh Konan Jean	PDCI-RDA	Politician	elected
2001	Gnankou Konan	PDCI-RDA	Politician	elected

== Demographics ==
Historical population
Year	1975	1988	2010	2014
Pop.	12,575	12,777	36,684	73,134
±%	—	+1.6%	+187.1%	+99.4%

== Education ==
Primary education Public: EPP Application	Secondary education Public High School: Modern High School; Technical College; Public College: Modern College; Modern College Ascension; Modern College Ivoire; Modern College Le Privilège; College Mouhayé

== Languages ==
Nouchi
- Native to: Ivory Coast
- Language family: Indo-European: Italic; Romance; Western; Gallo-Romance; Oïl; French; Nouchi

Language codes
- ISO 639-3: None (mis)
- Glottolog: nouc1234

Since independence, the official language throughout Ivory Coast has been French. The lingua franca, spoken and understood by the majority of the population, is Dioula, but the vernacular of the region is Baoulé. The French actually spoken in the region, as in Abidjan, is commonly called Ivorian Popular French or Moussa’s French (Note: "français de Moussa".) that is distinct from standard French pronunciation and also uses specific words, which makes it almost unintelligible to non-Ivorians.

Another form of spoken French is Nouchi, a slang spoken mainly by young people and which is also the language in which two satirical magazines are written, Gbich! and Y Fohi.

Since Daoukro Department receives many Ivorians from all over the country, all the vernacular languages of the country (about sixty) are practiced.

== Sports ==
The city has two football clubs, the RFC Daoukro, finalist of the Cup of Cote d'Ivoire football in 2002, and AS Daoukro, which competes in the Division Regional Championship, the equivalent of a fourth-tier division Both teams play their home games at Daoukro Municipal Stadium. As in most cities, it is organized, informally, tournament football players to seven, very popular in Ivory Coast, are called Maracanas. In 2008, Daoukro was a city-stage of the Tour of White Gold: the stage was won by the Ivorian rider Balima Mahamadi.

== Figures linked to the town ==
- Henri Konan Bédié (politician, President of the Republic of 1995 to 1999, chairman of PDCI-RDA)
- Gnamien N'goran (politician, Minister of Economy and Finance 1995-1999)
- Henriette Lagou, Minister of Social Action
- Lamine Konaté, representing RDR

== Villages ==
The 18 villages of the sub-prefecture of Daoukro and their population in 2014 are.

1. Agni-Assikasso (2 798)
2. Anoumabo (2 323)
3. Assuéti (1 375)
4. Bénanou (1 736)
5. Dadiékro (693)
6. Daoukro (44 342)
7. Dengbé (1 523)
8. Kongoti (1 297)
9. Kouassi-Diétèkro (1 435)
10. Koutoukounou (1 089)
11. Abbo-Kénégny (528)
12. Allokokro (1 891)
13. Komenan-Yaokro (1 778)
14. Lagoukro (1 920)
15. Léki - Kouadiokro (1 539)
16. Lékikro (2 581)
17. N'guessankro (2 271)
18. Pepressou (2 015)
