= Ouellé =

Ouellé, Ivory Coast Ouellé Koumanou
- Town, sub-prefecture, and commune
- Ouellé
- Location in Ivory Coast
- Coordinates: 7°18′N 4°1′W
- Country: Ivory Coast
- District: Lacs
- Region: Iffou
- Department: Ouellé

Population (2014)
  - Total: 27,521
- Time zone: UTC+0 (GMT)

Ouellé is a town in east-central Ivory Coast. It is a sub-prefecture and commune of Ouellé Department in Iffou Region, Lacs District.

In 2014, the population of the sub-prefecture of Ouellé was 27,521.

== Villages ==
The 21 villages of the sub-prefecture of Ouellé and their population in 2014 are:

1. Balékokro (1 194)
2. Dagou-N'gattakro (366)
3. Kodi (1 932)
4. Kodiakro (890)
5. Koumélékro (1 208)
6. Krindjabo (1 011)
7. N'zi-Akakro (753)
8. Ouellé (6 543)
9. Ouellé-Koumanou (1 435)
10. Sika-Komenankro (802)
11. Abouadoukpinkro (1 077)
12. Adiaou (756)
13. Assalékro (302)
14. Bendiè-Komenankro (1 955)
15. Daoulébo (968)
16. Ebini-Kouadiokro (705)
17. Egoukro (736)
18. Kouakoussékro (1 675)
19. Koviessou (296)
20. Panigokro (981)
21. Prikro-Ouellé (1 936)
