= Christianity in Ivory Coast =

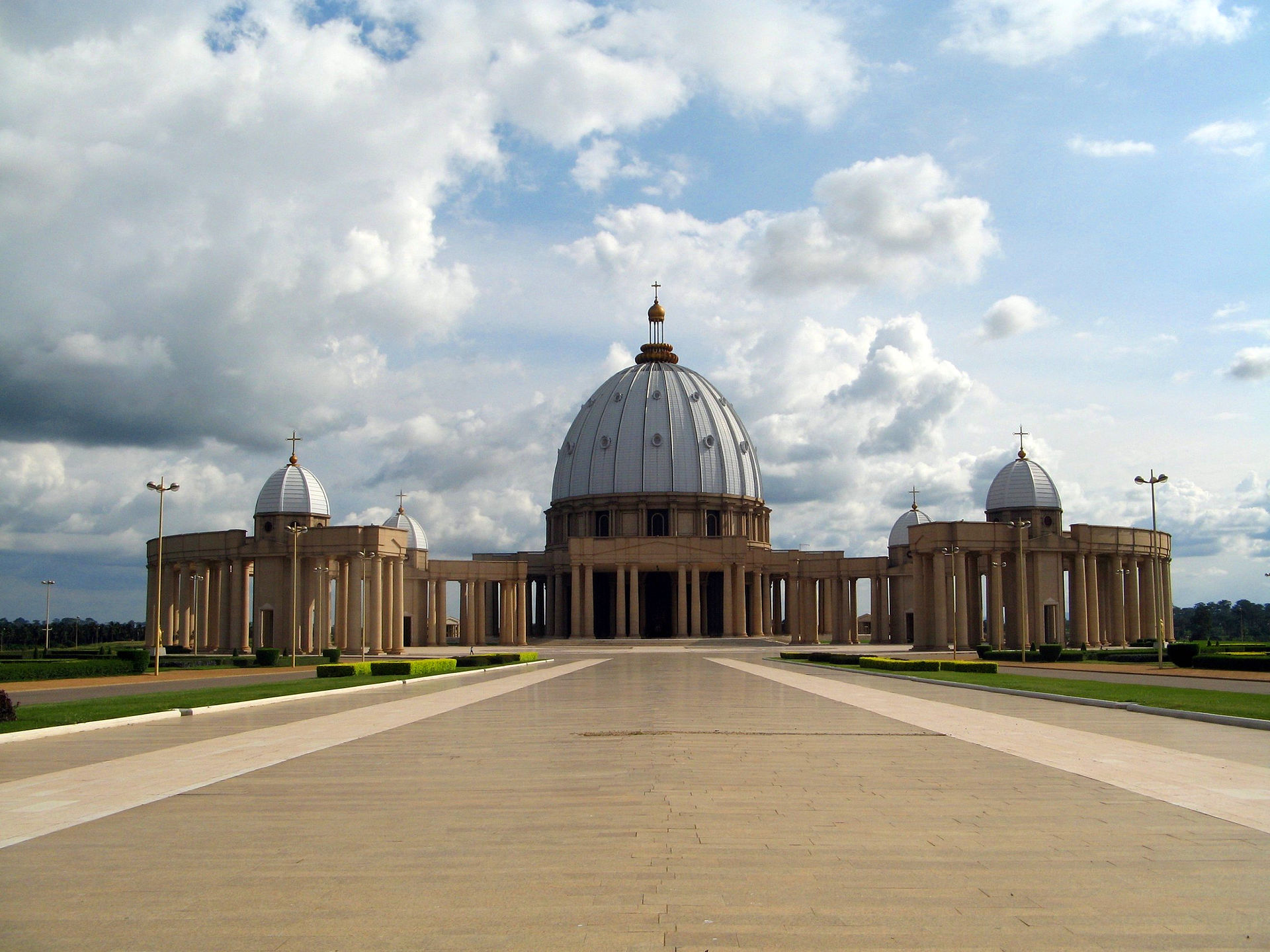
Basilica of Our Lady of Peace in capital Yamoussoukro, Ivory Coast. It is the 3rd tallest Christian church and the largest in the world.

Christianity in Ivory Coast is practiced by 39.8% of the population (2021 data) which is an increase since 2014 when it was 33.9% of the population. It dominates the south of the country.

== Catholicism ==
About 17% of the population is Catholic. Catholicism made a brief appearance in Ivory Coast in the mid-seventeenth century and reappeared two centuries later when French missionaries began to work among the Agni. The first African Catholic mission in Ivory Coast was established in 1895, and the first African priest was ordained in 1934. In the 1980s, the Catholic Church operated seminaries and schools throughout the country. Although Ivory Coast is officially a secular state, the president expressed pride in Abidjan's large Catholic cathedral and alone funded construction of a basilica at Yamoussoukro, his birthplace, by 1990. Some villages have also adopted patron saints, whom they honor on both secular and religious holidays.

== Protestant ==
In 2021 about 2.3% of the population described themselves as Evangélique (Protestant) or as Methodist. Also 0.5% of the population described themselves as following Harrism. Other forms of Christianity were followed by 20% of the population in 2021; a sharp rise from the 2014 figure of 2.2%.

=== Harrism ===
The largest Protestant religion as of the mid-1980s was Harrism, begun in 1914 by William Wade Harris, a Liberian preacher who proselytized along the coast of Ivory Coast and Ghana. Harris set an example for his followers by leading a simple life and eschewing conspicuous wealth. He condemned the use of amulets and fetishes as idolatry, and he preached against adultery, theft, and lying. His was a simple, fairly austere form of Christianity, which was open to Roman Catholics and Protestants and did not preach open defiance of colonial authority.

In 1915 Harris was expelled from the region by an uneasy colonial governor, an action that revitalized his church, leaving dozens of small "Harrist" churches along the coast. A decade later, Methodist missionaries made contact with Harris and attempted to continue his work among the lagoon peoples. Harris succeeded in part because of his ethnic background—he was African but not Ivoirian—but also because he converted women as well as men—a practice that had been scorned by earlier Christian missionaries who failed to recognize the impact of matrilineal descent on an individual's spiritual life. Harrism was subsequently recognized as a branch of Methodism. Most widely recognized among the syncretic religions of the country are numerous offshoots of Harrism along the coast, where new prophets, preachers, and disciples blend traditional beliefs, Harrism, and modern-day political advice to help deal with the problems of everyday life.

=== Latter-day Saints ===
The Church of Jesus Christ of Latter-day Saints claims more than 43,000 members in 211 wards or branches in Cote d'Ivoire. They have 27 family history centers in Cote d'Ivoire. A temple is being built in Abidjan, to be completed in 2021 or 2022.
