= Telephone numbers in Ivory Coast =

- Country: Ivory Coast
- Continent: Africa
- NSN length: 10
- Format: XX XX XXX XXX
- Country code: +225
- International access: 00
- Long-distance: n/a

On 15 January 2000 Côte d'Ivoire has expanded its national numbering plan from 6 to 8 digits. Two digits were prepended to existing subscriber numbers, according to the former numbering range, type of service and carrier.

It was expanded again from 8 to 10 digits on 31 January 2021, with two digits again prepended based on service and carrier.

== Calling formats ==
To call in Ivory Coast, the following format is used:

- yy xx xx xx xx - calls within Ivory Coast
- +225 27 xx xx xx xx calls from outside Ivory Coast to a landline
- +225 01 xx xx xx xx / +225 05 xx xx xx xx / +225 07 xx xx xx xx / +225 25 xx xx xx xx calls from outside Ivory Coast to a mobile number

== List of area codes in the Ivory Coast ==
LANDLINE LIST OF REGION CODES
Area/City	Area Code
Abengourou	35
Abidjan south	21
Abobo	24
Banco	23
Bouaké	31
Cocody	22
Daloa	32
Korhogo	36
Man	33
Plateau	20
San Pedro	34
Yamoussoukro	30

For fixed lines, the third digit of the NSN signifies the network operator.

OLD LIST OF MOBILE PREFIXES			NEW LIST OF MOBILE PREFIXES 2021 (Just use new prefix before old one)		
Prefix	NSN length	Operator	Prefix	NSN length	Operator
01	8 digits	Atlantic Telecom - Côte d'Ivoire	01	10 digits	Atlantic Telecom - Côte d'Ivoire
02	8 digits	Atlantic Telecom - Côte d'Ivoire	05	10 digits	MTN – Côte d'Ivoire
03	8 digits	Atlantic Telecom - Côte d'Ivoire	07	10 digits	Orange – Côte d'Ivoire
04	8 digits	MTN – Côte d'Ivoire			Oricel - Côte d'Ivoire (closed)
05	8 digits	MTN – Côte d'Ivoire			Warid - Côte d'Ivoire (closed)
06	8 digits	MTN – Côte d'Ivoire			Comium - Côte d'Ivoire (closed)
07	8 digits	Orange – Côte d'Ivoire			Aircomm - Côte d'Ivoire (closed)
08	8 digits	Orange – Côte d'Ivoire			
09	8 digits	Orange – Côte d'Ivoire			
40	8 digits	Atlantic Telecom - Côte d'Ivoire			
42	8 digits	Atlantic Telecom - Côte d'Ivoire			
44	8 digits	MTN – Côte d'Ivoire			
45	8 digits	MTN – Côte d'Ivoire			
46	8 digits	MTN – Côte d'Ivoire			
47	8 digits	Orange - Côte d'Ivoire			
48	8 digits	Orange - Côte d'Ivoire			
49	8 digits	Orange - Côte d'Ivoire			
50	8 digits	Warid - Côte d'Ivoire			
55	8 digits	MTN – Côte d'Ivoire			
56	8 digits	MTN – Côte d'Ivoire			
57	8 digits	Orange - Côte d'Ivoire			
58	8 digits	Orange - Côte d'Ivoire			
59	8 digits	Orange – Côte d'Ivoire			
60	8 digits	Oricel - Côte d'Ivoire			
66	8 digits	Comium - Côte d'Ivoire			
67	8 digits	Comium - Côte d'Ivoire			
69	8 digits	Aircomm - Côte d'Ivoire			
77	8 digits	Orange - Côte d'Ivoire			
78	8 digits	Orange - Côte d'Ivoire			
84	8 digits	MTN - Côte d'Ivoire			
85	8 digits	MTN - Côte d'Ivoire			
86	8 digits	MTN - Côte d'Ivoire			
87	8 digits	Orange - Côte d'Ivoire			
88	8 digits	Orange - Côte d'Ivoire			
89	8 digits	Orange - Côte d'Ivoire			
98	8 digits	Orange - Côte d'Ivoire			
