= Joseph Vaissète =

- Born: 1685; Gaillac, Albi, France
- Died: 10 April 1756 (aged 70–71); Saint-Germain-des-Prés, Paris, France
- Occupations: Monk, scholar
- Known for: Histoire générale de Languedoc (General history of Languedoc)

Dom Joseph Vaissète (or Vaissette) (1685 – 10 April 1756) was a scholarly French Benedictine monk who wrote a history of Languedoc and a geography of the world as it was known in his day. Vaissette's Histoire générale de Languedoc is still considered a work of great erudition and value by modern historians. The Geography had its faults from lack of technology, but was the most detailed and accurate of its day. Some names for the volume differ from modern usage. Because of this, he gives the name La Côte des Dents ("Coast of Teeth") to what is now the Côte d'Ivoire ("Ivory Coast").

== Life ==
Vaissète was born at Gaillac in the diocese of Albi in April 1685. His father was the procurer general of Albi. After attending school in his hometown, Vaissète moved to Toulouse for further his studies. He became a doctor of theology and a doctor of civil and canon law. Vaissète wanted to enter orders immediately, but at his father's request, acted as his father's substitute as procureur general for several years. In 1711, Vaissète retired from the world and took up the monastic and scholarly life.

At the age of 26, on July 11, 1711, he entered the Benedictine order in the Monastery of La Daurade, in Toulouse. Shortly after, he received the news of his father's death. In 1713, Vaissète's superiors called him to the Abbey of Saint-Germain-des-Prés in Paris because of his taste for history. In 1715, he was charged with co-authoring a history of Languedoc with Dom Claude de Vic. [The two authors were able to use the prior work of Dom Gabriel Marcland and Dom Pierre Auzieres, two learned and capable scholars who had separately worked in the province for several years, combing the libraries for material and making considerable progress in organizing the material had not been able to continue due to their advanced age or other jobs.] The first volume of the Histoire générale de Languedoc appeared in folio in 1730. Dom de Vic died in 1734, leaving Dom Vaissette in sole charge of the great work, which he successfully executed. The work was published in four more volumes, the fifth appearing in 1745. Dom Vaissette published a four-volume universal geography in 1855.

The character of Dom Vaissète combined simplicity and candour with spirit and erudition. He died at Saint-Germain-des-Prés on April 10, 1756. His co-worker Dom Bourotte was charged with finishing Vaissète's work on the history. Dom Vaissette was buried in the Sainte Vierge chapel with his fellow monk Dom Sensaric, who died on the same day.

== Work ==
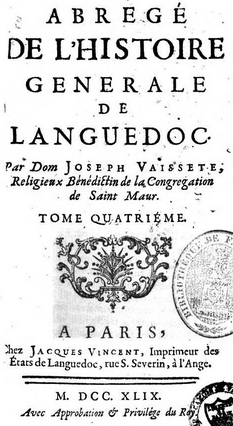
Cover of the fourth volume of the abridged history

Dom Vaissette published a dissertation on French origins in 1722, examining whether the French descended from the Tectosages, a sept of the Volcae, or from the ancient Gauls of Germany. Although the work was published in Paris anonymously, historians do not doubt that Vaissette was the author.

The first volume of the Histoire générale de Languedoc, which appeared in 1730, starts with the 2nd century of the Roman Republic. The volume covers the various expeditions of the Tectosages, French revolutions of the province still submitted to the Romans and the arrival of the Visigoths, Charlemagne's creation of the Kingdom of Aquitaine with its capital in Toulouse. The volume also follows leading events up to Charles the Bald's death. In this and subsequent volumes, Dom Vaissette added learned notes on aspects of the history of Languedoc at the end of the book, taking the form of scholarly dissertations on specific subjects. His notes are followed by transcriptions of ancient inscriptions, charters and other records that support the history given in the volume. Vaissète's first volume also included a general index of names and subjects.

The second volume, published in 1733, continues the history for the next three centuries from the start of Louis the Stammerer's reign in 877 up to the beginning of the troubles caused by the Albigensian heresy in 1165. It includes a history and genealogy of the Counts of Toulouse and other leading families, and the wars between these families. This volume records the participation of Raymond IV, Count of Toulouse in the First Crusade, of which he was one of the leaders, along with other noble families of the country. It also follows the establishment of several towns, many celebrated monasteries and the seats of the bishops.

The third volume appeared in 1736 and the fourth in 1742, ending with the Parliament of Languedoc's last opening in 1443, which had functioned continuously since that time. The fifth volume appeared in 1745, covering the next two centuries up to the death of Louis XIII in 1643, including the religious wars that lasted for almost a century. Dom Vaissette included additions, corrections and clarifications to the four previous volumes after the notes at the end of this volume. Dom Vaissette had planned a sixth volume, which was advertised in the fifth.

The abbot of Fontaines said that few general histories had been better written in the French language, and the erudition was profound and agreeable. The history was distinguished by the great impartiality with which it treated the Albigensians and other heretics who ravaged the province. Without passion or prejudice, the history presents the results of a study of all available information. The Jesuits, who had not shown the same moderation in their Histoire de l'église Gallicane (History of the Gallican Church), criticized the work in their Journal de Trévoux. Vaissette's erudite history continues to be respected and consulted by scholars to this day.

Dom Vaissette wrote an abridged version of his History of Languedoc in six volumes, the first of which appeared in 1740. The abridgment may be enough for those who are not from the province, but the people of Languedoc would find it too dry and too slim. Vaissette also wrote a Universal Geography in four volumes. While this has faults, "Universal Geography" was viewed with reason at the time as the most detailed, methodical and accurate available. One could only reproach the author with a lack of detail on the commerce and the arts of the countries he describes.

== Bibliography ==
- Vaissète, Joseph (1722). Dissertation sur l'origine des Français. Paris: Jacques Vincent.
- de Vic, Claude; Vaissète, Joseph (1730–1745). Histoire générale de Languedoc: avec des notes et les pièces justificatives. Paris: Jacques Vincent.
- Vaissète, Joseph (1740–1749). Abrégé de l'histoire générale de Languedoc. Paris: Jacques Vincent.
- Vaissète, Jean Joseph (1755). Géographie historique, ecclesiastique et civile (in French). Paris: chez Desaint & Saillant, J.-T. Herissant, J. Barois.
