= Akpassanou =

- Town and sub-prefecture
- Location in Ivory Coast
- Coordinates: 7°25′N 4°25′W
- Country: Ivory Coast
- District: Lacs
- Region: Iffou
- Department: Ouellé

Population (2014)
  - Total: 6,178
- Time zone: UTC+0 (GMT)

Akpassanou is a town in east-central Ivory Coast. It is a sub-prefecture of Ouellé Department in Iffou Region, Lacs District.

Akpassanou was a commune until March 2012, when it became one of 1,126 communes nationwide that were abolished.

In 2014, the population of the sub-prefecture of Akpassanou was 6,178.

== Villages ==
The four villages of the sub-prefecture of Akpassanou and their population in 2014 are:

1. Akpassanou (1,457)
2. Doménansou (1,130)
3. Foutou (1,922)
4. Gbangbo-Tiémélékro (1,669)
