= Ivory Coast =

Country in West Africa

Republic of Côte d'Ivoire République de Côte d'Ivoire
- Flag Coat of arms
- Motto: Union – Discipline – Travail (French) "Unity – Discipline – Work"
- Anthem: L'Abidjanaise (English: "Song of Abidjan")
- Capital: Yamoussoukro; 6°51′N 5°18′W
- Largest city: Abidjan
- Official languages: French
- Vernacular languages: French; Arabic; Bété; Dyula; Baoulé; Abron; Agni; Senoufo; others
- Ethnic groups (2021 census): 78.0% Ivorian; * 38.0% Akan; * 22.0% Northern Mande; * 22.0% Voltaic/Gur; * 9.1% Kru; * 8.6% Southern Mande; * 0.3% naturalized Ivorian; 22.0% non-Ivorian^{a}
- Religion (2021 census): 42.5% Islam; 39.8% Christianity; * 17.0% Catholic; * 22.8% other Christian; 12.6% no religion; 2.2% traditional faiths; 0.7% other religions; 2.2% unanswered
- Demonyms: Ivorian; Ivory Coasters
- Government: Unitary presidential republic
  - President: Alassane Ouattara
  - Vice President: Tiémoko Meyliet Koné
  - Prime Minister: Robert Beugré Mambé
  - Deputy/Vice-Prime Minister: Téné Birahima Ouattara
- Legislature: Parliament of Ivory Coast
  - Upper house: Senate
  - Lower house: National Assembly

History
  - Republic established: 4 December 1958
  - Independence from France: 7 August 1960

Area
  - Total: 322,462 km^{2} (124,503 sq mi) (68th)
  - Water (%): 1.4

Population
  - September 2026 estimate: ▲33,293,101 (49th)
  - December 2021 census: 29,389,150
  - Density: 97.7/km^{2} (253.0/sq mi) (139th)
- GDP (PPP): 2026 estimate
  - Total: ▲$294.178 billion (78th)
  - Per capita: ▲$8,694 (138th)
- GDP (nominal): 2026 estimate
  - Total: ▲$110.446 billion (84th)
  - Per capita: ▲$3,264 (141st)
- Gini (2021): ▼35.3 medium inequality
- HDI (2023): ▲0.582 medium (157th)
- Currency: West African CFA franc (XOF)
- Time zone: UTC±00:00 (GMT)
- Date format: dd/mm/yyyy
- Calling code: +225
- ISO 3166 code: CI
- Internet TLD: .ci
- 1. Including approximately 130,000 Lebanese and 14,000 French people.

Ivory Coast, also known as Côte d'Ivoire (Note: Pronounced /ˌkoʊt diːˈvwɑːr/ KOHT dee-VWAR in American English and [kot divwaʁ] in French.) and officially as the Republic of Côte d'Ivoire, is a country on the southern coast of West Africa. Its capital city Yamoussoukro, is located in the centre of the country, while its largest city and economic centre is the port city of Abidjan. It borders Guinea to the northwest, Liberia to the west, Mali to the north, Burkina Faso to the northeast, Ghana to the east, and the Atlantic Ocean's Gulf of Guinea to the south. With 33.2 million inhabitants in 2026, Ivory Coast is the third-most populous country in West Africa after Nigeria and Ghana. Its official language is French, and indigenous languages are also widely used, including Bété, Baoulé, Dyula, Dan, Anyin, and Cebaara Senufo. In total, there are around 78 languages spoken in Ivory Coast. The country has a religiously diverse population, including numerous followers of Islam, Christianity and traditional faiths often entailing animism.

Ivory Coast was traditionally home to several states, including Gyaaman, the Kong Empire, and Baoulé. The area became a protectorate of France in 1843 and was consolidated as a French colony in 1893 amid the Scramble for Africa. It achieved independence in 1960, led by Félix Houphouët-Boigny, who ruled the country until 1993. Relatively stable by regional standards, Ivory Coast established close political-economic ties with its West African neighbours while maintaining close relations with the West, especially France. Its stability was diminished by a coup d'état in 1999 and two civil wars—first between 2002 and 2007 and again during 2010–2011. It adopted a new constitution in 2016.

Ivory Coast is a republic with strong executive power vested in its president. Through the production of coffee and cocoa, it was an economic powerhouse in West Africa during the 1960s and 1970s, then experienced an economic crisis in the 1980s, contributing to a period of political and social turmoil that extended until 2011. Ivory Coast has again experienced high economic growth since the return of peace and political stability in 2011. From 2012 to 2023, the economy grew by an average of 7.1% per year in real terms, the second-fastest rate of economic growth in Africa and fourth-fastest rate in the world. In 2023, Ivory Coast had the second-highest GDP per capita in West Africa, behind Cape Verde. Despite this, as of the most recent survey in 2016, 46.1% of the population continues to be affected by multidimensional poverty. As of 2023, Ivory Coast is the world's largest exporter of cocoa beans and has high levels of income for its region. The economy still relies heavily on agriculture, with smallholder cash-crop production predominating.

== Etymology ==
Originally, Portuguese merchant-explorers in the 15th and 16th centuries divided the west coast of Africa, very roughly, into four "coasts" reflecting resources available from each coast. The coast which they named the Costa do Marfim—meaning 'coast of ivory', and translated into French as Côte d'Ivoire—lay between what was known as the Guiné de Cabo Verde, so-called "Upper Guinea" at Cap-Vert, and Lower Guinea. There was also a Pepper Coast, also known as the "Grain Coast" (present-day Liberia), a "Gold Coast" (Ghana), and a "Slave Coast" (Togo, Benin and Nigeria). Like those, the name Ivory Coast reflected the major trade that occurred on that particular stretch of the coast: the export of ivory.

Other names for the area included the Côte de Dents, (Note: Joseph Vaissète, in his 1755 Géographie historique, ecclésiastique et civile, lists the name as La Côte des Dents ('The Coast of the Teeth'), but notes that Côte de Dents is the more correct form.) literally 'Coast of Teeth', again reflecting the ivory trade; the Côte de Quaqua, after the people whom the Dutch named the Quaqua (alternatively Kwa Kwa); the Coast of the Five and Six Stripes, after a type of cotton fabric also traded there; and the Côte du Vent, (Note: Côte du Vent sometimes denoted the combined "Ivory" and "Grain" coasts, or sometimes just the "Grain" coast.) the Windward Coast, after perennial local off-shore weather conditions. In the 19th century, usage switched to Côte d'Ivoire.

The coastline of the modern state is not quite coterminous with what the 15th- and 16th-century merchants knew as the "Teeth" or "Ivory" coast, which was considered to stretch from Cape Palmas to Cape Three Points and which is thus now divided between the modern states of Ghana and Ivory Coast (with a minute portion of Liberia). It retained the name through French rule and independence in 1960.

The name had long since been translated literally into other languages, (Note: Literal translations include German: Elfenbeinküste, Italian: Costa d'Avorio, Finnish: Norsunluurannikko, Russian: Бе́рег Слоно́вой Ко́сти, and English: Ivory Coast.) which the post-independence government considered increasingly troublesome whenever its international dealings extended beyond the Francophone sphere. Therefore, in April 1986, the government declared that Côte d'Ivoire (or, more fully, République de Côte d'Ivoire) would be its formal name for the purposes of diplomatic protocol and has since officially refused to recognize any translations from French to other languages in its international dealings. Despite the Ivorian government's request, the English translation "Ivory Coast" (often "the Ivory Coast") is still frequently used in English by various media outlets and publications. Many governments use "Côte d'Ivoire" for diplomatic reasons, as do their outlets, such as the Chinese CCTV News. Other organizations that use "Côte d'Ivoire" include the Central Intelligence Agency in its World Factbook and the international sport organizations FIFA and the IOC (referring to their national football and Olympic teams in international games and in official broadcasts), the Encyclopædia Britannica and the National Geographic Society. The BBC usually uses "Ivory Coast" both in news reports and on its page about the country. In a similar fashion, The Economist states "...Ivory Coast, not Côte d'Ivoire..." ABC News, Fox News, The Times, The New York Times, the South African Broadcasting Corporation, and the Canadian Broadcasting Corporation all use "Ivory Coast" either exclusively or predominantly.

== History ==
=== Land migration ===
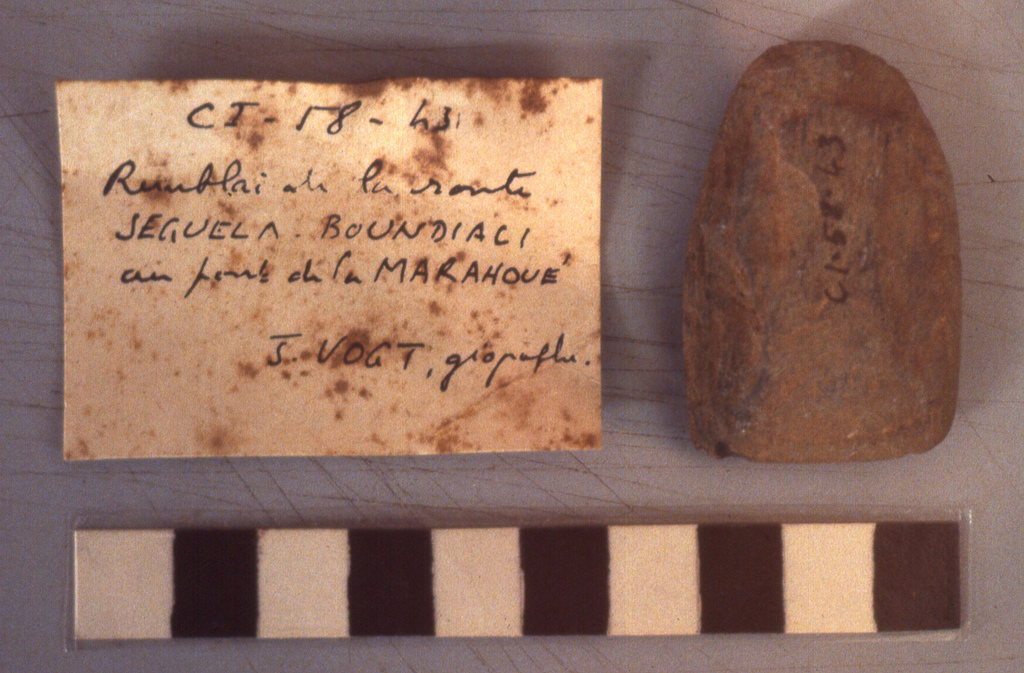
Prehistoric polished stone celt from Boundiali in northern Ivory Coast, photo taken at the IFAN Museum of African Arts in Dakar, Senegal

The first human presence in Ivory Coast has been difficult to determine because human remains have not been well preserved in the country's humid climate. However, newly found weapon and tool fragments (specifically, polished axes cut from shale and remnants of cooking and fishing) have been interpreted as a possible indication of a large human presence during the Upper Paleolithic period (15,000 to 10,000 BC), or at the minimum, the Neolithic period.

The earliest known inhabitants of Ivory Coast have left traces scattered throughout the territory. Historians believe that they were all either displaced or absorbed by the ancestors of the present indigenous inhabitants, who migrated south into the area before the 16th century. Such groups included the Ehotilé (Aboisso), Kotrowou (Fresco), Zéhiri (Grand-Lahou), Ega and Diès (Divo).

=== Pre-Islamic and Islamic periods ===
The first recorded history appears in the chronicles of North African (Berber) traders, who, from early Roman times, conducted a caravan trade across the Sahara in salt, slaves, gold, and other goods. The southern termini of the trans-Saharan trade routes were located on the edge of the desert, and from there supplemental trade extended as far south as the edge of the rainforest. The most important terminals—Djenné, Gao, and Timbuctu—grew into major commercial centres around which the great Sudanic empires developed.

By controlling the trade routes with their powerful military forces, these empires were able to dominate neighbouring states. The Sudanic empires also became centres of Islamic education. Islam had been introduced in the western Sudan by Muslim Berbers; it spread rapidly after the conversion of many important rulers. From the 11th century, by which time the rulers of the Sudanic empires had embraced Islam, it spread south into the northern areas of contemporary Ivory Coast.

The Ghana Empire, the earliest of the Sudanic empires, flourished in the region encompassing present-day southeast Mauritania and southern Mali between the 4th and 13th centuries. At the peak of its power in the 11th century, its realms extended from the Atlantic Ocean to Timbuktu. After the decline of Ghana, the Mali Empire grew into a powerful Muslim state, which reached its apogee in the early part of the 14th century. The territory of the Mali Empire in Ivory Coast was limited to the northwest corner around Odienné.

Its slow decline starting at the end of the 14th century followed internal discord and revolts by vassal states, one of which, Songhai, flourished as an empire between the 14th and 16th centuries. Songhai was also weakened by internal discord, which led to factional warfare. This discord spurred most of the migrations southward toward the forest belt. The dense rainforest covering the southern half of the country created barriers to the large-scale political organisations that had arisen in the north. Inhabitants lived in villages or clusters of villages; their contacts with the outside world were filtered through long-distance traders. Villagers subsisted on agriculture and hunting.

=== Pre-European modern period ===
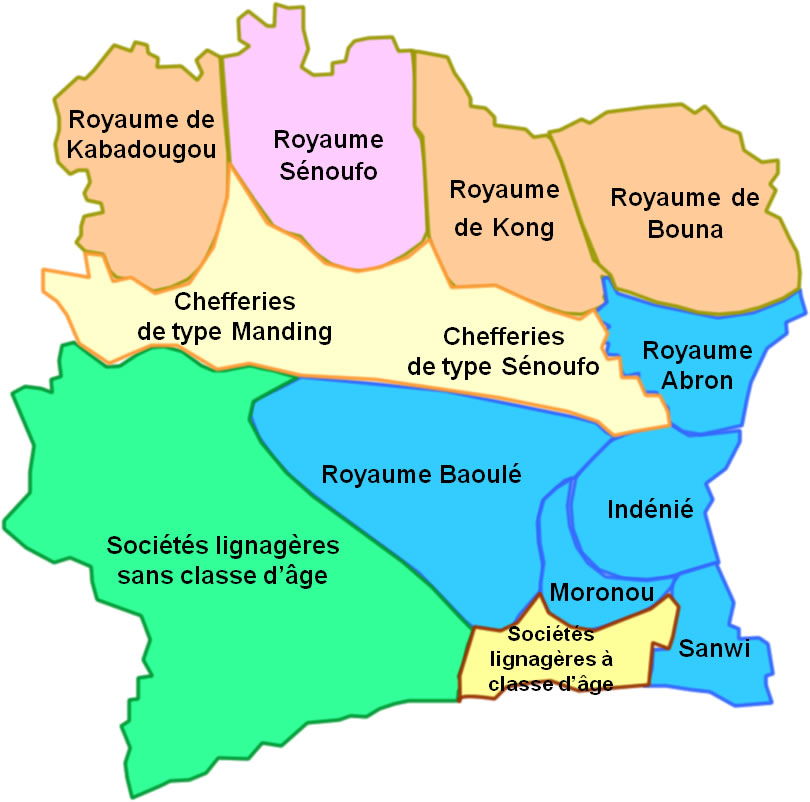
Pre-European kingdoms

Five important states flourished in Ivory Coast during the pre-European early modern period. The Muslim Kong Empire was established by the Dyula in the early 18th century in the north-central region inhabited by the Sénoufo, who had fled Islamisation under the Mali Empire. Although Kong became a prosperous centre of agriculture, trade, and crafts, ethnic diversity and religious discord gradually weakened the kingdom. In 1895 the city of Kong was sacked and conquered by Samori Ture of the Wassoulou Empire.

The Abron kingdom of Gyaaman was established in the 17th century by an Akan group, the Abron, who had fled the developing Ashanti confederation of Asanteman in what is present-day Ghana. From their settlement south of Bondoukou, the Abron gradually extended their hegemony over the Dyula people in Bondoukou, who were recent arrivals from the market city of Begho. Bondoukou developed into a major centre of commerce and Islam. The kingdom's Quranic scholars attracted students from all parts of West Africa. In the mid-17th century in east-central Ivory Coast, other Akan groups fleeing the Asante established a Baoulé kingdom at Sakasso and two Agni kingdoms, Indénié and Sanwi.

The Baoulé, like the Ashanti, developed a highly centralised political and administrative structure under three successive rulers. It finally split into smaller chiefdoms. Despite the breakup of their kingdom, the Baoulé strongly resisted French subjugation. The descendants of the rulers of the Agni kingdoms tried to retain their separate identity long after Ivory Coast's independence; as late as 1969, the Sanwi attempted to break away from Ivory Coast and form an independent kingdom.

=== Establishment of French rule ===
Compared to neighbouring Ghana, Ivory Coast, though practising slavery and slave raiding, suffered little from the slave trade. European slave and merchant ships preferred other areas along the coast. The earliest recorded European voyage to West Africa was made by the Portuguese in 1482. The first West African French settlement, Saint-Louis, was founded in the mid-17th century in Senegal, while at about the same time, the Dutch ceded to the French a settlement at Gorée Island, off Dakar. A French mission was established in 1687 at Assinie near the border with the Gold Coast (now Ghana). The Europeans suppressed the local practice of slavery at this time and forbade the trade to their merchants.

Assinie's survival was precarious, however; the French were not firmly established in Ivory Coast until the mid-19th century. In 1843–44, French Admiral Louis Édouard Bouët-Willaumez signed treaties with the kings of the Grand-Bassam and Assinie regions, making their territories a French protectorate. French explorers, missionaries, trading companies, and soldiers gradually extended the area under French control inland from the lagoon region. Pacification was not accomplished until 1915.

Activity along the coast stimulated European interest in the interior, especially along the two great rivers, the Senegal and the Niger. Concerted French exploration of West Africa began in the mid-19th century but moved slowly, based more on individual initiative than on government policy. In the 1840s, the French concluded a series of treaties with local West African chiefs that enabled the French to build fortified posts along the Gulf of Guinea to serve as permanent trading centres. The first posts in Ivory Coast included one at Assinie and another at Grand-Bassam, which became the colony's first capital. The treaties provided for French sovereignty within the posts and for trading privileges in exchange for fees or coutumes paid annually to the local chiefs for the use of the land. The arrangement was not entirely satisfactory to the French, because trade was limited and misunderstandings over treaty obligations often arose. Nevertheless, the French government maintained the treaties, hoping to expand trade. France also wanted to maintain a presence in the region to stem the increasing influence of the British along the Gulf of Guinea coast.

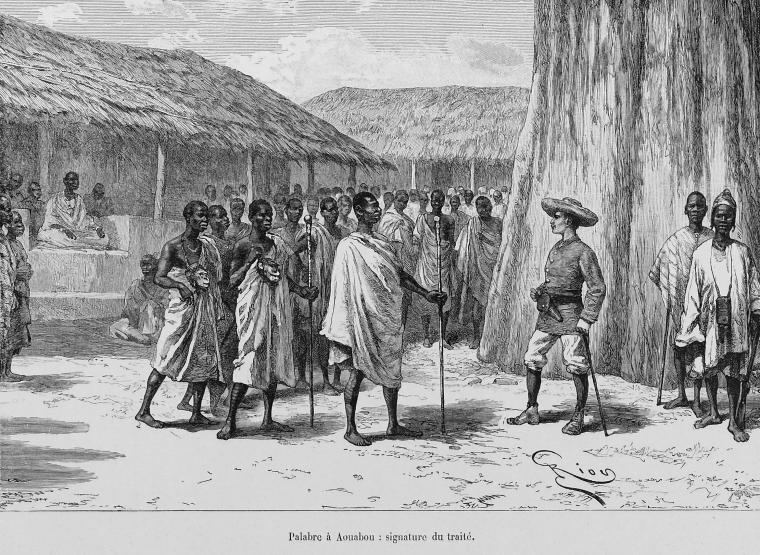
Louis-Gustave Binger of French West Africa in 1892 treaty signing with Famienkro leaders, in present-day N'zi-Comoé Region, Ivory Coast

The defeat of France in the Franco-Prussian War in 1871 and the subsequent annexation by Germany of the French province of Alsace–Lorraine initially caused the French government to abandon its colonial ambitions and withdraw its military garrisons from its West African trading posts, leaving them in the care of resident merchants. The trading post at Grand-Bassam was left in the care of a shipper from Marseille, Arthur Verdier, who in 1878 was named Resident of the Establishment of Ivory Coast.

In 1886, to support its claims of effective occupation, France again assumed direct control of its West African coastal trading posts and embarked on an accelerated program of exploration in the interior. In 1887, Lieutenant Louis-Gustave Binger began a two-year journey that traversed parts of Ivory Coast's interior. By the end of the journey, he had concluded four treaties establishing French protectorates in Ivory Coast. Also in 1887, Verdier's agent, Marcel Treich-Laplène, negotiated five additional agreements that extended French influence from the headwaters of the Niger River Basin through Ivory Coast.

=== French colonial era ===
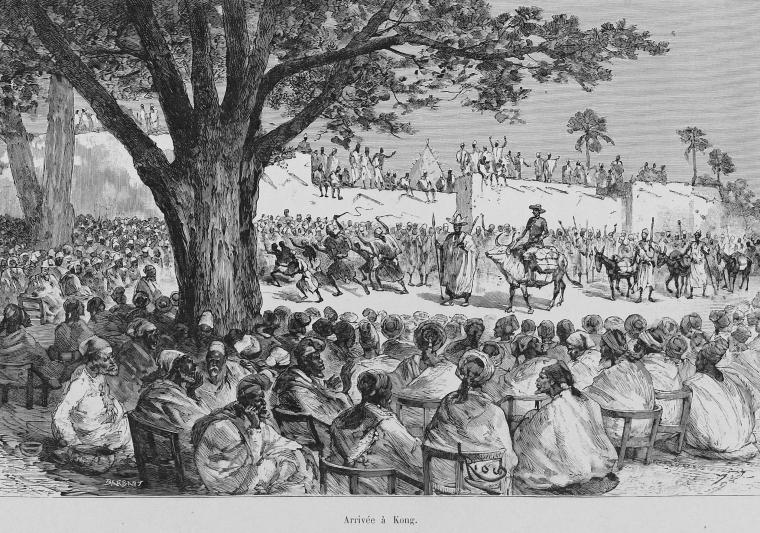
Arrival in Kong of Louis-Gustave Binger in 1892

By the end of the 1880s, France had established control over the coastal regions, and in 1889 Britain recognised French sovereignty in the area. That same year, France named Treich-Laplène the titular governor of the territory. In 1893, Ivory Coast became a French colony, with its capital in Grand-Bassam, and Captain Binger was appointed governor. Agreements with Liberia in 1892 and with Britain in 1893 determined the eastern and western boundaries of the colony, but the northern boundary was not fixed until 1947 because of efforts by the French government to attach parts of Upper Volta (present-day Burkina Faso) and French Sudan (present-day Mali) to Ivory Coast for economic and administrative reasons.

France's main goal was to stimulate the production of exports. Coffee, cocoa, and palm oil crops were soon planted along the coast. Ivory Coast stood out as the only West African country with a sizeable population of European settlers; elsewhere in West and Central Africa, Europeans who emigrated to the colonies were largely bureaucrats. As a result, French citizens owned one-third of the cocoa, coffee, and banana plantations and adopted the local forced-labour system.

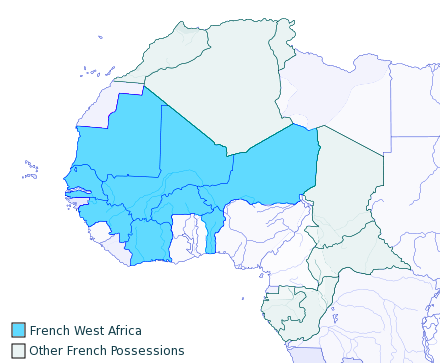
Colonies of French West Africa c. 1913

Throughout the early years of French rule, French military contingents were sent inland to establish new posts. The African population resisted French penetration and settlement, even in areas where treaties of protection had been in force. Among those offering the greatest resistance was Samori Ture, who in the 1880s and 1890s was establishing the Wassoulou Empire, which extended over large parts of present-day Guinea, Mali, Burkina Faso, and Ivory Coast. Ture's large, well-equipped army, which could manufacture and repair its own firearms, attracted strong support throughout the region. The French responded to Ture's expansion and conquest with military pressure. French campaigns against Ture, which were met with fierce resistance, intensified in the mid-1890s until he was captured in 1898 and his empire dissolved.

France's imposition of a head tax in 1900 to support the colony's public works program provoked protests. Many Ivorians saw the tax as a violation of the protectorate treaties because they felt that France was demanding the equivalent of a coutume from the local kings, rather than the reverse. Many, especially in the interior, also considered the tax a humiliating symbol of submission. In 1905, the French officially abolished slavery in most of French West Africa. From 1904 to 1958, Ivory Coast was part of the Federation of French West Africa. It was a colony and an overseas territory under the Third Republic. In World War I, France organized regiments from Ivory Coast to fight in France, and colony resources were rationed from 1917 to 1919. Until the period following World War II, governmental affairs in French West Africa were administered from Paris. France's policy in West Africa was reflected mainly in its philosophy of "association", meaning that all Africans in Ivory Coast were officially French "subjects" but without rights to representation in Africa or France.

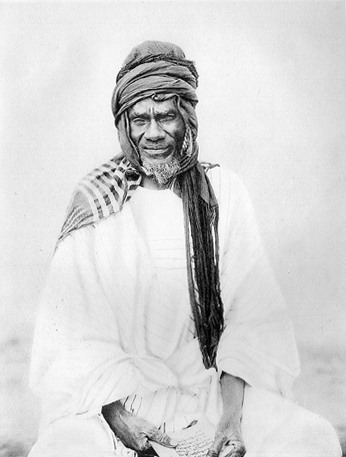
Samori Touré, founder and leader of the Wassoulou Empire which resisted French rule in West Africa

French colonial policy incorporated concepts of assimilation and association. Based on the assumed superiority of French culture, in practice the assimilation policy meant the extension of the French language, institutions, laws, and customs to the colonies. The policy of association also affirmed the superiority of the French in the colonies, but it entailed different institutions and systems of laws for the coloniser and the colonised. Under this policy, the Africans in Ivory Coast were allowed to preserve their own customs insofar as they were compatible with French interests.

An indigenous elite trained in French administrative practice formed an intermediary group between French and Africans. After 1930, a small number of Westernized Ivorians were granted the right to apply for French citizenship. Most Ivorians, however, were classified as French subjects and were governed under the principle of association. As subjects of France, natives outside the civilised elite had no political rights. They were drafted for work in mines, on plantations, as porters, and on public projects as part of their tax responsibility. They were expected to serve in the military and were subject to the indigénat, a separate system of law.

During World War II, the Vichy regime remained in control until 1943, when members of General Charles de Gaulle's provisional government assumed control of all French West Africa. The Brazzaville Conference of 1944, the first Constituent Assembly of the Fourth Republic in 1946, and France's gratitude for African loyalty during World War II, led to far-reaching governmental reforms in 1946. French citizenship was granted to all African "subjects", the right to organise politically was recognised, and various forms of forced labour were abolished. Between 1944 and 1946, many national conferences and constituent assemblies took place between France's government and provisional governments in Ivory Coast. Governmental reforms were established by late 1946, which granted French citizenship to all African "subjects" under the colonial control of the French.

Until 1958, governors appointed in Paris administered the colony of Ivory Coast, using a system of direct, centralised administration that left little room for Ivorian participation in policy-making. The French colonial administration also adopted divide-and-rule policies, applying ideas of assimilation only to the educated elite. The French were also interested in ensuring that the small but influential Ivorian elite was sufficiently satisfied with the status quo to refrain from developing anti-French sentiments and calls for independence. Although strongly opposed to the practices of association, educated Ivorians believed that they would achieve equality in the French colonial system through assimilation rather than through complete independence from France. After the assimilation doctrine was implemented through the postwar reforms, though, Ivorian leaders realised that even assimilation implied the superiority of the French over the Ivorians and that discrimination and inequality would end only with independence.

=== Independence ===
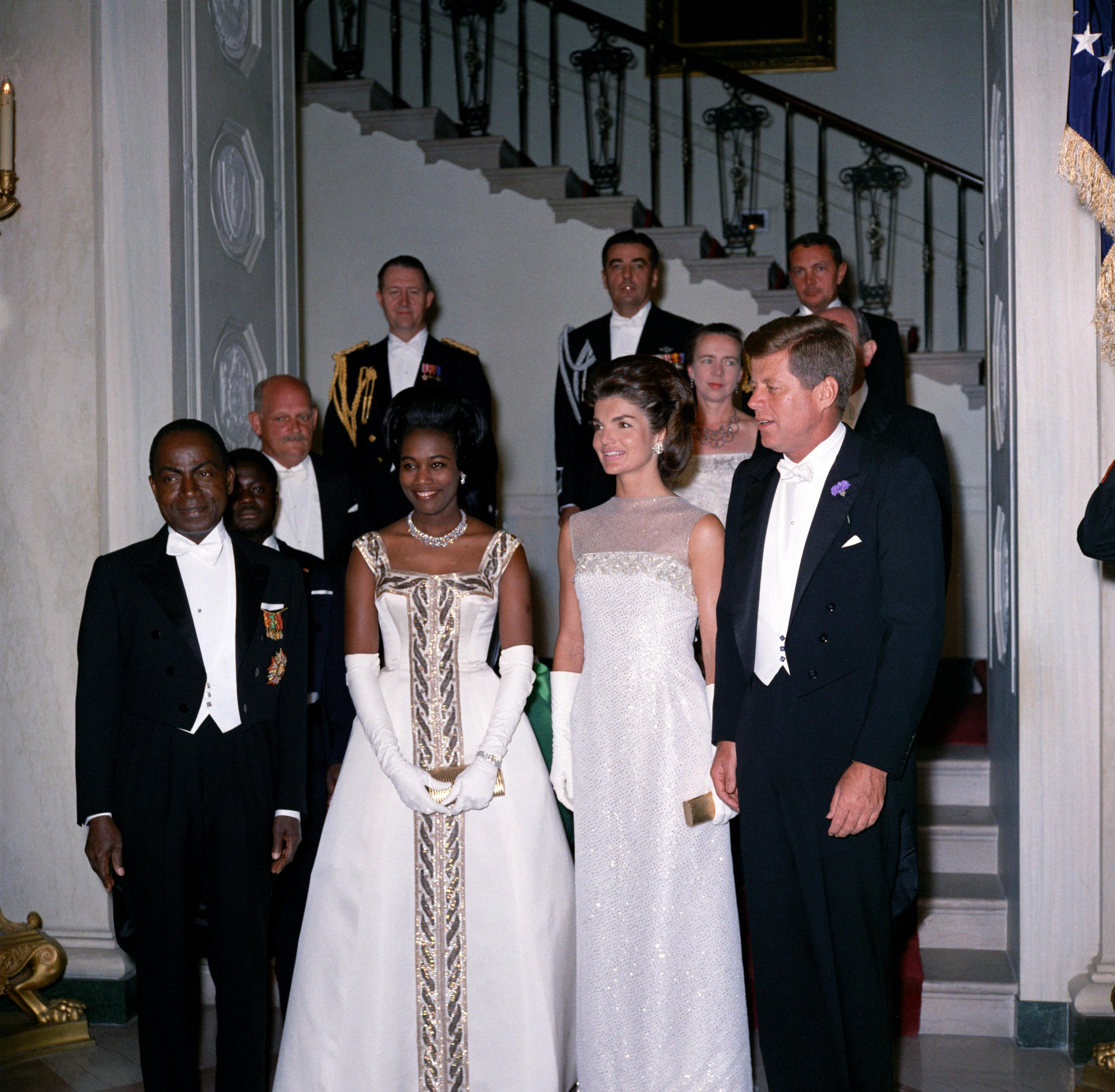
President Félix Houphouët-Boigny and First Lady Marie-Thérèse Houphouët-Boigny in the White House Entrance Hall with President John F. Kennedy and First Lady Jacqueline Kennedy in 1962

Félix Houphouët-Boigny, the son of a Baoulé chief, became Ivory Coast's father of independence. In 1944, he formed the country's first agricultural trade union for African cocoa farmers like himself. Angered that colonial policy favoured French plantation owners, the union members united to recruit migrant workers for their own farms. Houphouët-Boigny soon rose to prominence and was elected to the French Parliament in Paris within a year. A year later, the French abolished forced labour. Houphouët-Boigny established a strong relationship with the French government, expressing a belief that Ivory Coast would benefit from the relationship, which it did for many years. France appointed him as a minister, the first African to become a minister in a European government.

A turning point in relations with France was reached with the 1956 Overseas Reform Act (Loi Cadre), which transferred several powers from Paris to elected territorial governments in French West Africa and also removed the remaining voting inequities. On 4 December 1958, Ivory Coast became an autonomous member of the French Community, which had replaced the French Union.

By 1960, the country was easily French West Africa's most prosperous, contributing over 40% of the region's total exports. When Houphouët-Boigny became the first president, his government gave farmers good prices for their products to further stimulate production, which was further boosted by a significant immigration of workers from surrounding countries. Coffee production increased significantly, catapulting Ivory Coast into third place in world output, behind Brazil and Colombia. By 1979, the country was the world's leading producer of cocoa. It also became Africa's leading exporter of pineapples and palm oil. French technicians contributed to the "Ivorian miracle". In other African nations, the people drove out the Europeans following independence, but in Ivory Coast, they poured in. The French community grew from only 30,000 before independence to 60,000 in 1980, most of them teachers, managers, and advisors. For 20 years, the economy maintained an annual growth rate of nearly 10%—the highest of Africa's non-oil-exporting countries.

=== Houphouët-Boigny administration ===
Houphouët-Boigny's one-party rule was not amenable to political competition. Laurent Gbagbo, (who eventually became the president of Ivory Coast in 2000) had to flee the country in the 1980s after he incurred the ire of Houphouët-Boigny by founding the Ivorian Popular Front. Houphouët-Boigny banked on his broad appeal to the population, who continued to elect him. He was criticised for his emphasis on developing large-scale projects.

Many felt the millions of dollars spent transforming his home village, Yamoussoukro, into the new political capital were wasted; others supported his vision to develop a centre for peace, education, and religion in the heart of the country. In the early 1980s, the world recession and a local drought sent shock waves through the Ivorian economy. The overcutting of timber and collapsing sugar prices caused the country's external debt to increase three-fold. Crime rose dramatically in Abidjan as an influx of villagers exacerbated unemployment caused by the recession. In 1990, hundreds of civil servants went on strike, joined by students protesting institutional corruption. The unrest forced the government to support multi-party democracy. Houphouët-Boigny became increasingly feeble and died in 1993. He favoured Henri Konan Bédié as his successor.

=== Bédié administration ===
In October 1995, Bédié overwhelmingly won re-election against a fragmented and disorganised opposition. He tightened his hold over political life, jailing several hundred opposition supporters. In contrast, the economic outlook improved, at least superficially, with decreasing inflation and an attempt to remove foreign debt. Unlike Houphouët-Boigny, who was very careful to avoid any ethnic conflict and left access to administrative positions open to immigrants from neighbouring countries, Bedié emphasised the concept of Ivoirité to exclude his rival Alassane Ouattara, who had two northern Ivorian parents, from running for the future presidential election. As people originating from foreign countries are a large part of the Ivorian population, this policy excluded many people of Ivorian nationality. The relationship between various ethnic groups became strained, resulting in two civil wars in the following decades.

Similarly, Bedié excluded many potential opponents from the army. In late 1999, a group of dissatisfied officers staged a military coup, putting General Robert Guéï in power. Bedié fled into exile in France. The new leadership reduced crime and corruption, and the generals pressed for austerity and campaigned in the streets for a less wasteful society.

=== First civil war ===
A presidential election was held in October 2000 in which Laurent Gbagbo vied with Guéï, but it was not peaceful. The lead-up to the election was marked by military and civil unrest. Following a public uprising that resulted in around 180 deaths, Guéï was swiftly replaced by Gbagbo. Ouattara was disqualified by the country's Supreme Court because of his alleged Burkinabé nationality. The constitution did not allow noncitizens to run for the presidency. This sparked violent protests in which his supporters, mainly from the country's north, battled riot police in the capital, Yamoussoukro.

In the early hours of 19 September 2002, while Gbagbo was in Italy, an armed uprising occurred. Troops who were to be demobilised mutinied, launching attacks in several cities. The battle for the main gendarmerie barracks in Abidjan lasted until mid-morning, but by lunchtime the government forces had secured Abidjan. They had lost control of the north of the country, and rebel forces made their stronghold in the northern city of Bouaké. The rebels threatened to move on to Abidjan again, and France deployed troops from its base in the country to stop their advance. The French said they were protecting their citizens from danger, but their deployment also helped government forces. That the French were helping either side was not established as a fact, but each side accused the French of supporting the opposite side. Whether French actions improved or worsened the situation in the long term is disputed. What exactly happened that night is also disputed.

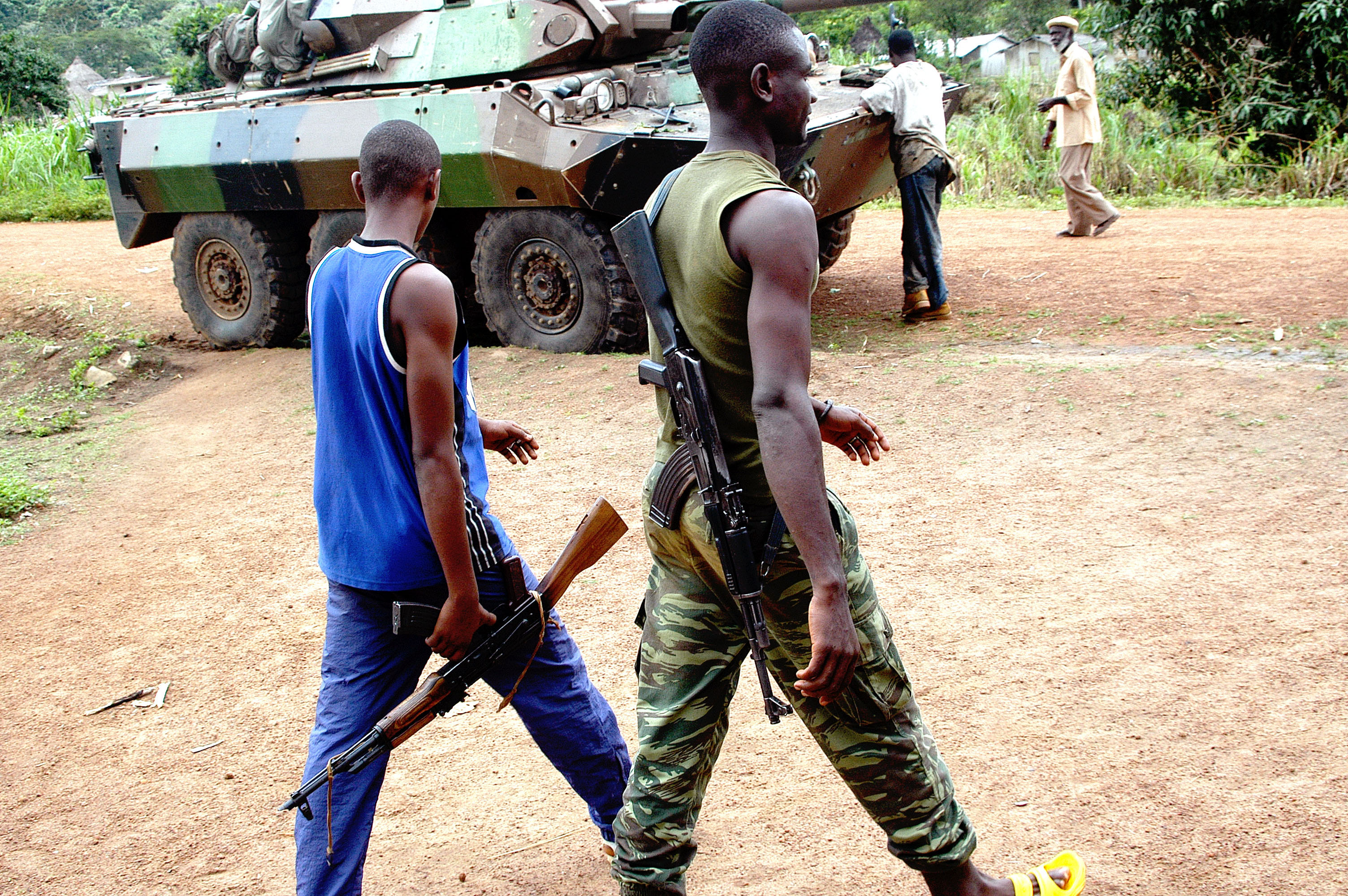
Armed Ivorians next to a French Foreign Legion armoured car, 2004

The government claimed that former president Robert Guéï led a coup attempt, and state TV showed pictures of his dead body in the street; counter-claims stated that he and 15 others had been murdered at his home, and his body had been moved to the streets to incriminate him. Ouattara took refuge in the German embassy; his home had been burned down. President Gbagbo cut short his trip to Italy and on his return stated, in a television address, that some of the rebels were hiding in the shanty towns where foreign migrant workers lived. Gendarmes and vigilantes bulldozed and burned homes by the thousands, attacking residents. An early ceasefire with the rebels, which had the backing of much of the northern populace, proved short-lived and fighting over the prime cocoa-growing areas resumed. France sent in troops to maintain the cease-fire boundaries, and militias, including warlords and fighters from Liberia and Sierra Leone, took advantage of the crisis to seize parts of the west.

In January 2003, Gbagbo and rebel leaders signed accords creating a "government of national unity". Curfews were lifted, and French troops patrolled the country's western border. The unity government was unstable, and central problems remained with neither side achieving its goals. In March 2004, 120 people were killed at an opposition rally, and subsequent mob violence led to the evacuation of foreign nationals. A report concluded the killings were planned. Though UN peacekeepers were deployed to maintain a "Zone of Confidence", relations between Gbagbo and the opposition continued to deteriorate.

Early in November 2004, after the peace agreement had effectively collapsed because the rebels refused to disarm, Gbagbo ordered airstrikes against the rebels. During one of these airstrikes in Bouaké, on 6 November 2004, French soldiers were hit, and nine were killed; the Ivorian government said it was a mistake, but the French claimed it was deliberate. They responded by destroying most Ivorian military aircraft (two Su-25 planes and five helicopters), and violent retaliatory riots against the French broke out in Abidjan.

Gbagbo's original term as president expired on 30 October 2005, but a peaceful election was deemed impossible, so his term in office was extended for a maximum of one year, according to a plan worked out by the African Union and endorsed by the United Nations Security Council. With the late-October deadline approaching in 2006, the election was regarded as very unlikely to be held by that point, and the opposition and the rebels rejected the possibility of another term extension for Gbagbo. The UN Security Council endorsed another one-year extension of Gbagbo's term on 1 November 2006; however, the resolution provided for strengthening of Prime Minister Charles Konan Banny's powers. Gbagbo said the next day that elements of the resolution deemed to be constitutional violations would not be applied.

A peace accord between the government and the rebels, or New Forces, was signed on 4 March 2007, and subsequently Guillaume Soro, leader of the New Forces, became prime minister. These events were seen by some observers as substantially strengthening Gbagbo's position. According to UNICEF, at the end of the civil war, water and sanitation infrastructure had been greatly damaged. Communities across the country required repairs to their water supply.

=== Second civil war ===
The presidential elections that should have been organised in 2005 were postponed until November 2010. The preliminary results showed a loss for Gbagbo in favour of former Prime Minister Ouattara.

The ruling FPI contested the results before the Constitutional Council, charging massive fraud in the northern departments controlled by the rebels of the New Forces. These charges were contradicted by United Nations observers (unlike African Union observers). The report of the results led to severe tension and violent incidents. The Constitutional Council, which consisted of Gbagbo supporters, declared the results of seven northern departments unlawful and that Gbagbo had won the elections with 51% of the vote – instead of Ouattara winning with 54%, as reported by the Electoral Commission. After the inauguration of Gbagbo, Ouattara—who was recognised as the winner by most countries and the United Nations—organised an alternative inauguration. These events raised fears of a resurgence of the civil war; thousands of refugees fled the country.

The African Union sent Thabo Mbeki, former president of South Africa, to mediate the conflict. The United Nations Security Council adopted a resolution recognising Ouattara as the winner of the elections, based on the position of the Economic Community of West African States, which suspended Ivory Coast from all its decision-making bodies while the African Union also suspended the country's membership.

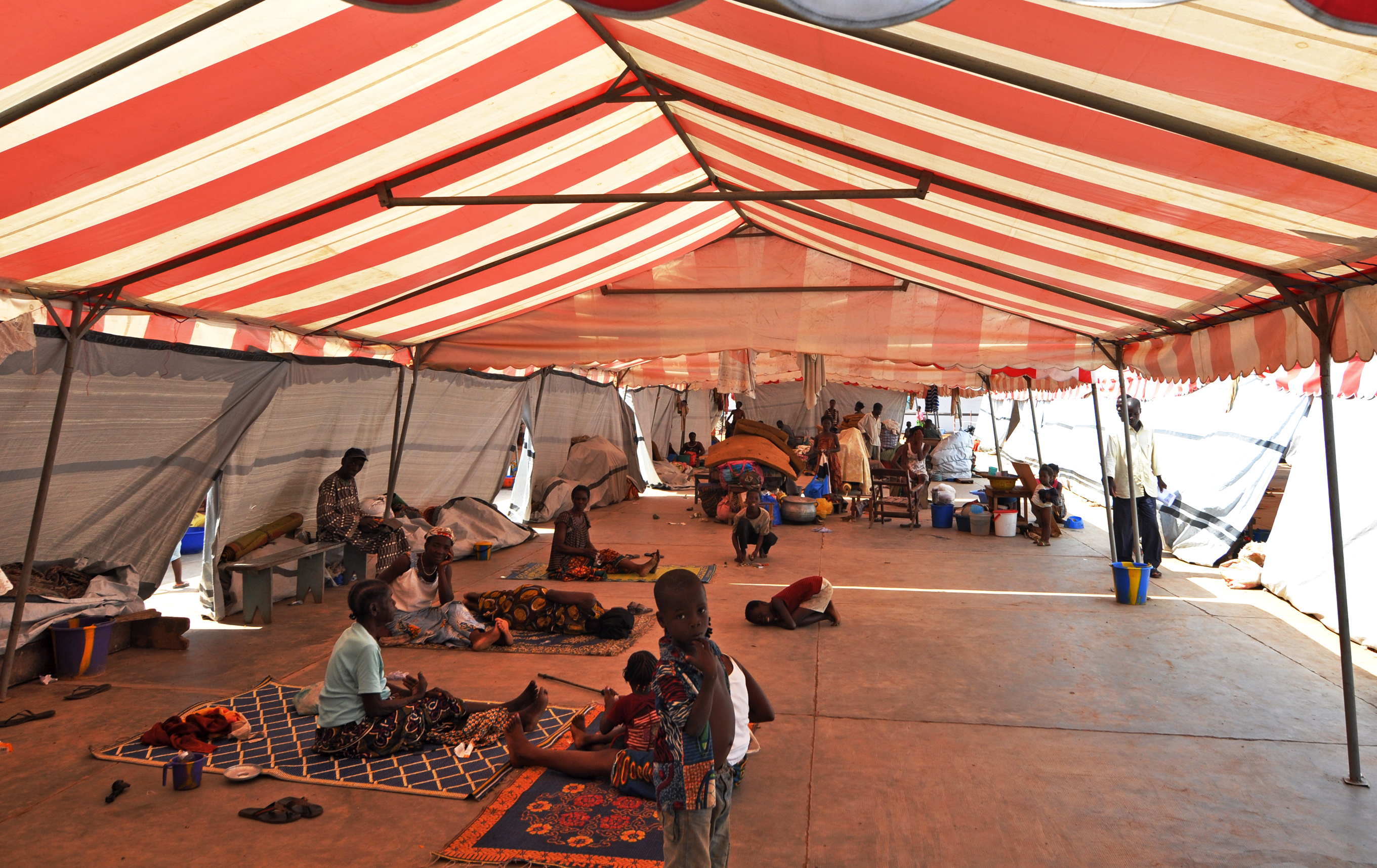
A shelter for internally displaced persons during the 2011 civil war

In 2010, a colonel of Ivory Coast armed forces, Nguessan Yao, was arrested in New York in a year-long United States Immigration and Customs Enforcement operation charged with procuring and illegal export of weapons and munitions: 4,000 handguns, 200,000 rounds of ammunition, and 50,000 tear-gas grenades, in violation of a UN embargo. Several other Ivory Coast officers were released because they had diplomatic passports. His accomplice, Michael Barry Shor, an international trader, was located in Virginia.

The 2010 presidential election led to the 2010–2011 Ivorian crisis and the Second Ivorian Civil War. International organisations reported numerous human-rights violations by both sides. In Duékoué, hundreds of people were killed. In nearby Bloléquin, dozens were killed. UN and French forces took military action against Gbagbo. Gbagbo was taken into custody after a raid into his residence on 11 April 2011. The country was severely damaged by the war, and it was observed that Ouattara had inherited a formidable challenge to rebuild the economy and reunite Ivorians. Gbagbo was taken to the International Criminal Court in January 2016. He was declared acquitted by the court but given a conditional release in January 2019. Belgium has been designated as a host country.

=== Ouattara administration ===
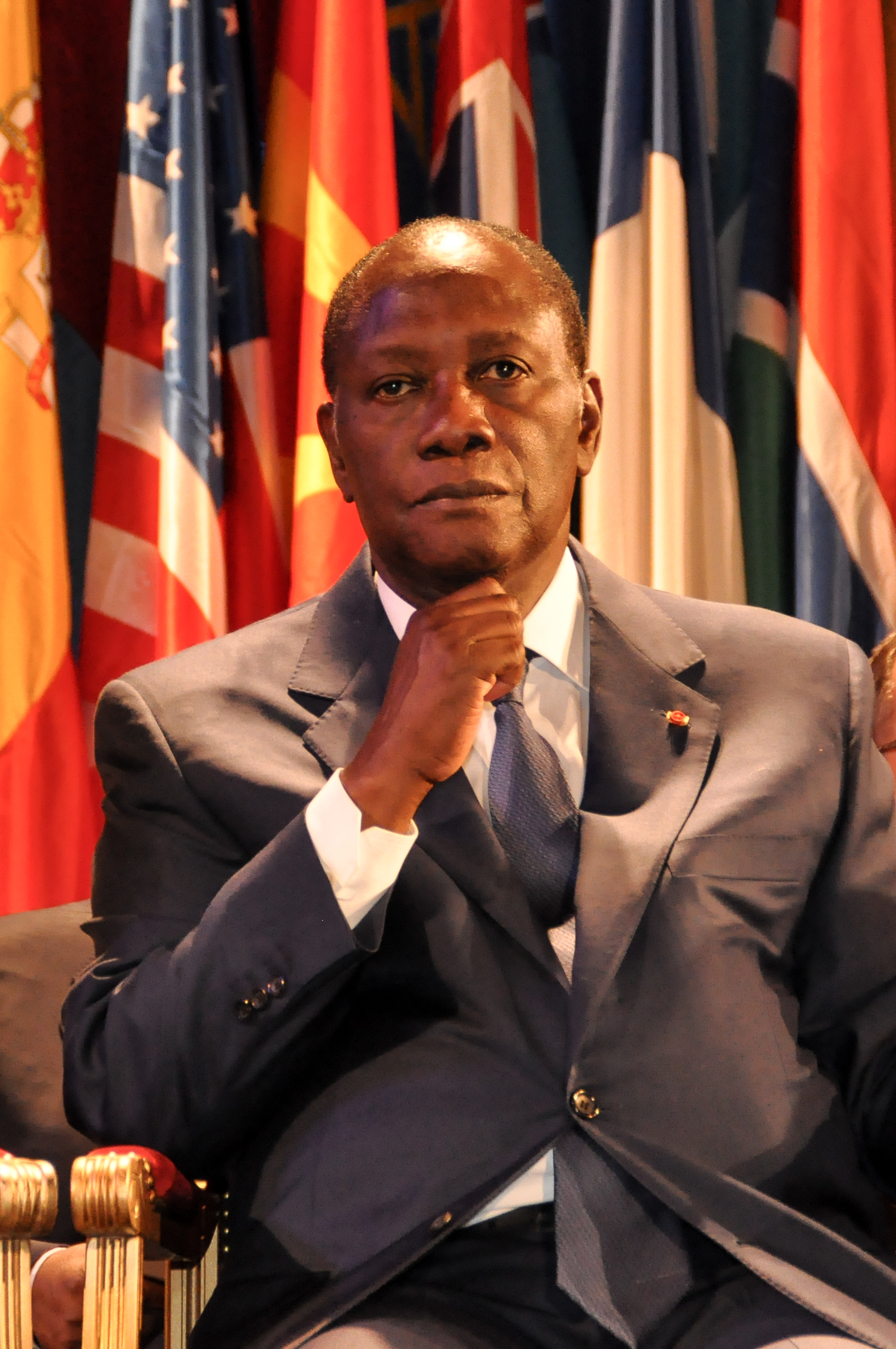
Alassane Ouattara, President of Ivory Coast since 2010

Ouattara has ruled the country since 2010. President Ouattara was re-elected in the 2015 presidential election. In November 2020, he won a third term in office in elections boycotted by the opposition. His opponents argued it was illegal for Ouattara to run for a third term. Ivory Coast's Constitutional Council formally ratified President Ouattara's re-election to a third term in November 2020.

In December 2022, Ivory Coast's electric production company, Compagnie ivoirienne d'électricité, launched a commission to establish the country's first solar plant in Boundiali, with an installation of 37.5 MW, backed by a 10-MW lithium battery energy storage system.

On 6 October 2023, Ouattara dissolved the government and removed Prime Minister Patrick Achi from his position. During Ouattara's current presidency, there have been seven Prime Ministers: Guillaume Soro, Gilbert Aké, Jeannot Ahoussou-Kouadio, Amadou Gon Coulibaly, Hamed Bakayoko, Patrick Achi, and Robert Beugré Mambé.

== Government and politics ==
The government is divided into three branches: executive, legislative, and judicial. The Parliament of Ivory Coast, consists of the indirectly elected Senate and the National Assembly which has 255 members, elected for five-year terms.

Since 1983, Ivory Coast's capital has been Yamoussoukro, while Abidjan was the administrative centre. Most countries maintain their embassies in Abidjan.

Although most of the fighting ended by late 2004, the country remained split in two, with the north controlled by the New Forces. A new presidential election was expected to be held in October 2005, and the rival parties agreed in March 2007 to proceed with this, but it continued to be postponed until November 2010 due to delays in its preparation.

Elections were finally held in 2010. The first round of elections was held peacefully and widely hailed as free and fair. Runoffs were held on 28 November 2010, after being delayed one week from the original date of 21 November. Laurent Gbagbo as president ran against former Prime Minister Alassane Ouattara. On 2 December, the Electoral Commission declared that Ouattara had won the election by a margin of 54% to 46%. In response, the Gbagbo-aligned Constitutional Council rejected the declaration, and the government announced that country's borders had been sealed. An Ivorian military spokesman said, "The air, land, and sea border of the country are closed to all movement of people and goods."

President Alassane Ouattara has led the country since 2010 and he was re-elected to a third term in November 2020 elections boycotted by two leading opposition figures former President Henri Konan Bedie and ex-Prime Minister Pascal Affi N'Guessan. The Achi II government ruled the country from April 2022 until 6 October 2023. It was succeeded by the government of Robert Beugré Mambé on 17 October 2023.

=== Foreign relations ===
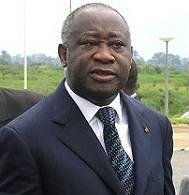
Former President Laurent Gbagbo was extradited to the International Criminal Court (ICC), becoming the first head of state to be taken into the court's custody.

In Africa, Ivorian diplomacy favours step-by-step economic and political cooperation. In 1959, Ivory Coast formed the Council of the Entente with Dahomey (Benin), Upper Volta (Burkina Faso), Niger, and Togo; in 1965, the African and Malagasy Common Organization (OCAM); in 1972, the Economic Community of West Africa (CEAO). The latter organisation changed to the Economic Community of West African States (ECOWAS) in 1975. A founding member of the Organization of African Unity (OAU) in 1963 and then of the African Union in 2000, Ivory Coast defends respect for state sovereignty and peaceful cooperation between African countries.

Worldwide, Ivorian diplomacy is committed to fair economic and trade relations, including the fair trade of agricultural products and the promotion of peaceful relations with all countries. Ivory Coast thus maintains diplomatic relations with international organisations and countries all around the world. In particular, it has signed United Nations treaties such as the Convention Relating to the Status of Refugees, the 1967 Protocol, and the 1969 Convention Governing Specific Aspects of Refugee Problems in Africa. Ivory Coast is a member of the Organisation of Islamic Cooperation, African Union, La Francophonie, Latin Union, Economic Community of West African States, and South Atlantic Peace and Cooperation Zone.

Ivory Coast has partnered with nations of the Sub-Saharan region to strengthen water and sanitation infrastructure. This has been done mainly with the help of organisations such as UNICEF and corporations like Nestle.

In 2015, the United Nations engineered the Sustainable Development Goals (replacing the Millennium Development Goals). They focus on health, education, poverty, hunger, climate change, water sanitation, and hygiene. A major focus was clean water and salinisation. Experts working in these fields have designed the WASH concept. WASH focuses on safe drinkable water, hygiene, and proper sanitation. The group has had a major impact on the sub-Saharan region of Africa, particularly the Ivory Coast. By 2030, they plan to have universal and equal access to safe and affordable drinking water.

On 1 January 2025 Ivory Coast announced that France will withdraw its troops from the country, an act that will reduce France's influence in the region. On 20 February 2025, France officially handed over its sole military base in Ivory Coast to local authorities, marking a significant shift in their bilateral relations. This decision aligns with France's broader strategy to reduce its military footprint in West Africa, following similar withdrawals from countries like Chad, Senegal, Mali, Niger, and Burkina Faso. The base, previously home to the 43rd Marine Infantry Battalion (43rd BIMA), has been transferred to Ivorian control and renamed Camp Thomas d'Aquin Ouattara, in honor of the nation's first army chief. This move reflects Ivory Coast's growing emphasis on national sovereignty and the modernization of its armed forces.

=== Military ===
The military is estimated to comprise 22,000 personnel (as of 2017).

As of 2012, major equipment items reported by the Ivory Coast Army included 10 T-55 tanks (marked as potentially unserviceable), five AMX-13 light tanks, 34 reconnaissance vehicles, 10 BMP-1/2 armoured infantry fighting vehicles, 41 wheeled APCs, and 36+ artillery pieces.

In 2012, the Ivory Coast Air Force consisted of one Mil Mi-24 attack helicopter and three SA330L Puma transports (marked as potentially unserviceable).

In 2017, Ivory Coast signed the UN treaty on the Prohibition of Nuclear Weapons.

== Administrative divisions ==
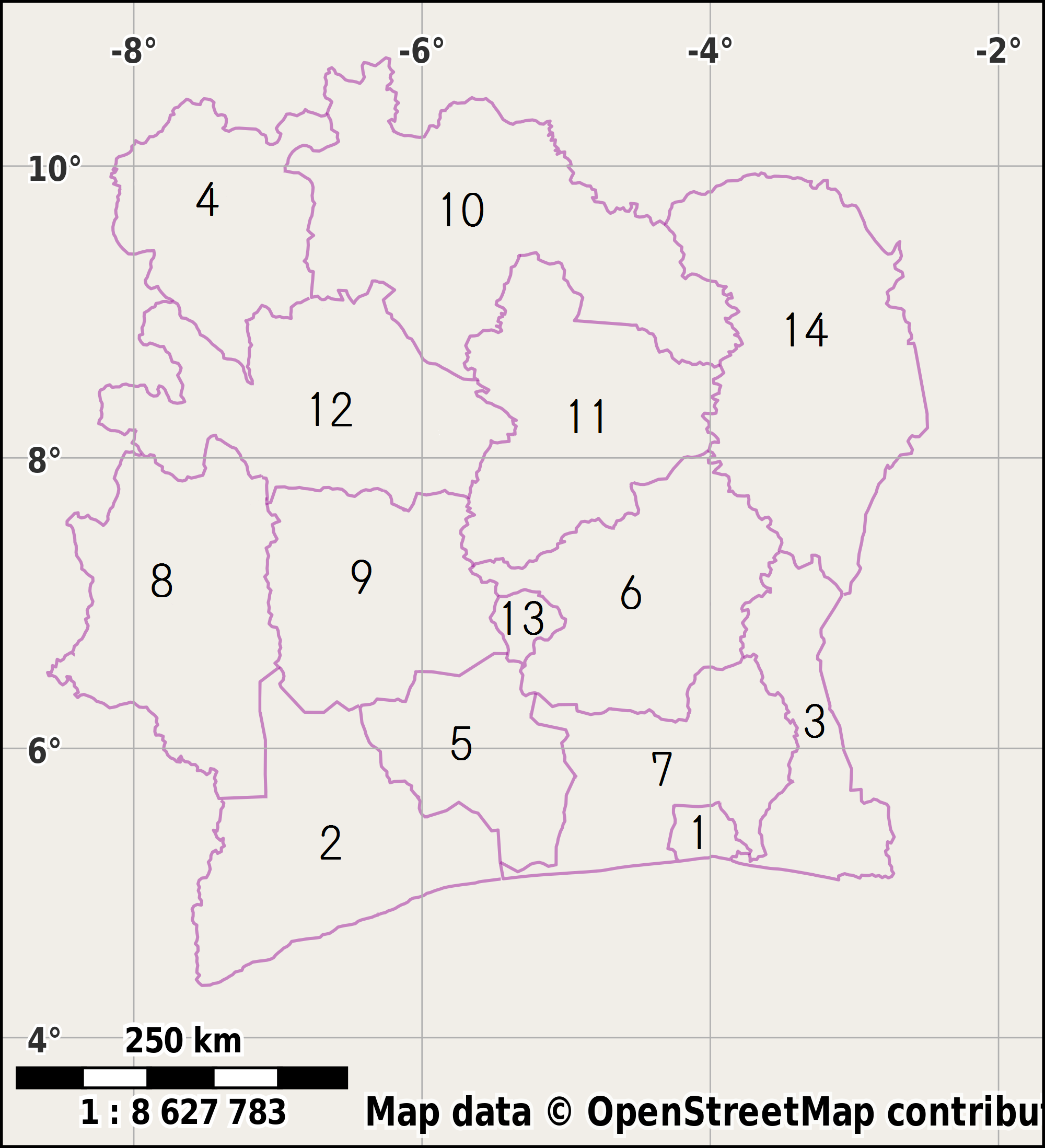
Districts of Ivory Coast

Since 2011, Ivory Coast has been administratively organised into 12 districts plus two district-level autonomous cities. The districts are sub-divided into 31 regions; the regions are divided into 108 departments; and the departments are divided into 510 sub-prefectures. In some instances, multiple villages are organised into communes. The autonomous districts are not divided into regions, but they do contain departments, sub-prefectures, and communes. Since 2011, governors for the 12 non-autonomous districts have not been appointed. As a result, these districts have not yet begun to function as governmental entities.

The following is the list of districts, district capitals and each district's regions:

Map no.	District	District capital	Regions	Region seat	Population
1	Abidjan (District Autonome d'Abidjan)				4,707,404
2	Bas-Sassandra (District du Bas-Sassandra)	San-Pédro	Gbôklé	Sassandra	400,798
2	Bas-Sassandra (District du Bas-Sassandra)	San-Pédro	Nawa	Soubré	1,053,084
2	Bas-Sassandra (District du Bas-Sassandra)	San-Pédro	San-Pédro	San-Pédro	826,666
3	Comoé (District du Comoé)	Abengourou	Indénié-Djuablin	Abengourou	560,432
3	Comoé (District du Comoé)	Abengourou	Sud-Comoé	Aboisso	642,620
4	Denguélé (District du Denguélé)	Odienné	Folon	Minignan	96,415
4	Denguélé (District du Denguélé)	Odienné	Kabadougou	Odienné	193,364
5	Gôh-Djiboua (District du Gôh-Djiboua)	Gagnoa	Gôh	Gagnoa	876,117
5	Gôh-Djiboua (District du Gôh-Djiboua)	Gagnoa	Lôh-Djiboua	Divo	729,169
6	Lacs (District des Lacs)	Dimbokro	Bélier Region	Yamoussoukro	346,768
6	Lacs (District des Lacs)	Dimbokro	Iffou	Daoukro	311,642
6	Lacs (District des Lacs)	Dimbokro	Moronou	Bongouanou	352,616
6	Lacs (District des Lacs)	Dimbokro	N'Zi	Dimbokro	247,578
7	Lagunes (District des Lagunes)	Dabou	Agnéby-Tiassa	Agboville	606,852
7	Lagunes (District des Lagunes)	Dabou	Grands-Ponts	Dabou	356,495
7	Lagunes (District des Lagunes)	Dabou	La Mé	Adzopé	514,700
8	Montagnes (District des Montagnes)	Man	Cavally	Guiglo	459,964
8	Montagnes (District des Montagnes)	Man	Guémon	Duékoué	919,392
8	Montagnes (District des Montagnes)	Man	Tonkpi	Man	992,564
9	Sassandra-Marahoué (District du Sassandra-Marahoué)	Daloa	Haut-Sassandra	Daloa	1,430,960
9	Sassandra-Marahoué (District du Sassandra-Marahoué)	Daloa	Marahoué	Bouaflé	862,344
10	Savanes (District des Savanes)	Korhogo	Bagoué	Boundiali	375,687
10	Savanes (District des Savanes)	Korhogo	Poro	Korhogo	763,852
10	Savanes (District des Savanes)	Korhogo	Tchologo	Ferkessédougou	467,958
11	Vallée du Bandama (District de la Vallée du Bandama)	Bouaké	Gbêkê	Bouaké	1,010,849
11	Vallée du Bandama (District de la Vallée du Bandama)	Bouaké	Hambol	Katiola	429,977
12	Woroba (District du Woroba)	Séguéla	Béré	Mankono	389,758
12	Woroba (District du Woroba)	Séguéla	Bafing	Touba	183,047
12	Woroba (District du Woroba)	Séguéla	Worodougou	Séguéla	272,334
13	Yamoussoukro (District Autonome du Yamoussoukro)				355,573
14	Zanzan (District du Zanzan)	Bondoukou	Bounkani	Bouna	267,167
14	Zanzan (District du Zanzan)	Bondoukou	Gontougo	Bondoukou	667,185

=== Largest cities ===
Largest cities or towns in Ivory Coast According to the 2014 Census in Ivory Coast
Rank	Name	District	Pop.
1	Abidjan	Abidjan	4,395,243
2	Bouaké	Vallée du Bandama	536,719
3	Daloa	Sassandra-Marahoué	245,360
4	Korhogo	Savanes	243,048
5	Yamoussoukro	Yamoussoukro	212,670
6	San-Pédro	Bas-Sassandra	164,944
7	Gagnoa	Gôh-Djiboua	160,465
8	Man	Montagnes	149,041
9	Divo	Gôh-Djiboua	105,397
10	Anyama	Abidjan	103,297

== Geography ==
Köppen climate classification map of Ivory Coast

Ivory Coast is a country in western sub-Saharan Africa. It borders Liberia and Guinea in the west, Mali and Burkina Faso in the north, Ghana in the east, and the Gulf of Guinea (Atlantic Ocean) in the south. The country lies between latitudes 4° and 11°N, and longitudes 2° and 9°W. Around 64.8% of the land is agricultural land; arable land amounted to 9.1%, permanent pasture 41.5%, and permanent crops 14.2%. Water pollution is one of the biggest issues that the country is currently facing.

=== Biodiversity ===
There are over 1,200 animal species including 223 mammals, 702 birds, 161 reptiles, 85 amphibians, and 111 species of fish, alongside 4,700 plant species. It is the most biodiverse country in West Africa, with the majority of its wildlife population living in the nation's rugged interior. The nation has nine national parks, the largest of which is Assgny National Park which occupies an area of around 17,000 hectares or 42,000 acres.

The country contains six terrestrial ecoregions: Eastern Guinean forests, Guinean montane forests, Western Guinean lowland forests, Guinean forest–savanna mosaic, West Sudanian savanna, and Guinean mangroves. It had a 2018 Forest Landscape Integrity Index mean score of 3.64/10, ranking it 143rd globally out of 172 countries.

== Economy ==
Exports of Ivory Coast by product category (2019) Chemical products Transportation Machines Mineral products Plastics and rubbers Metals Foodstuffs Precious metals Textiles Instruments Animal products Vegetable products Paper goods Footwear and headwear Miscellaneous Stone and glass Wood products Animal and vegetable bi-products Animal hides Arts and antiques Weapons

GDP per capita development

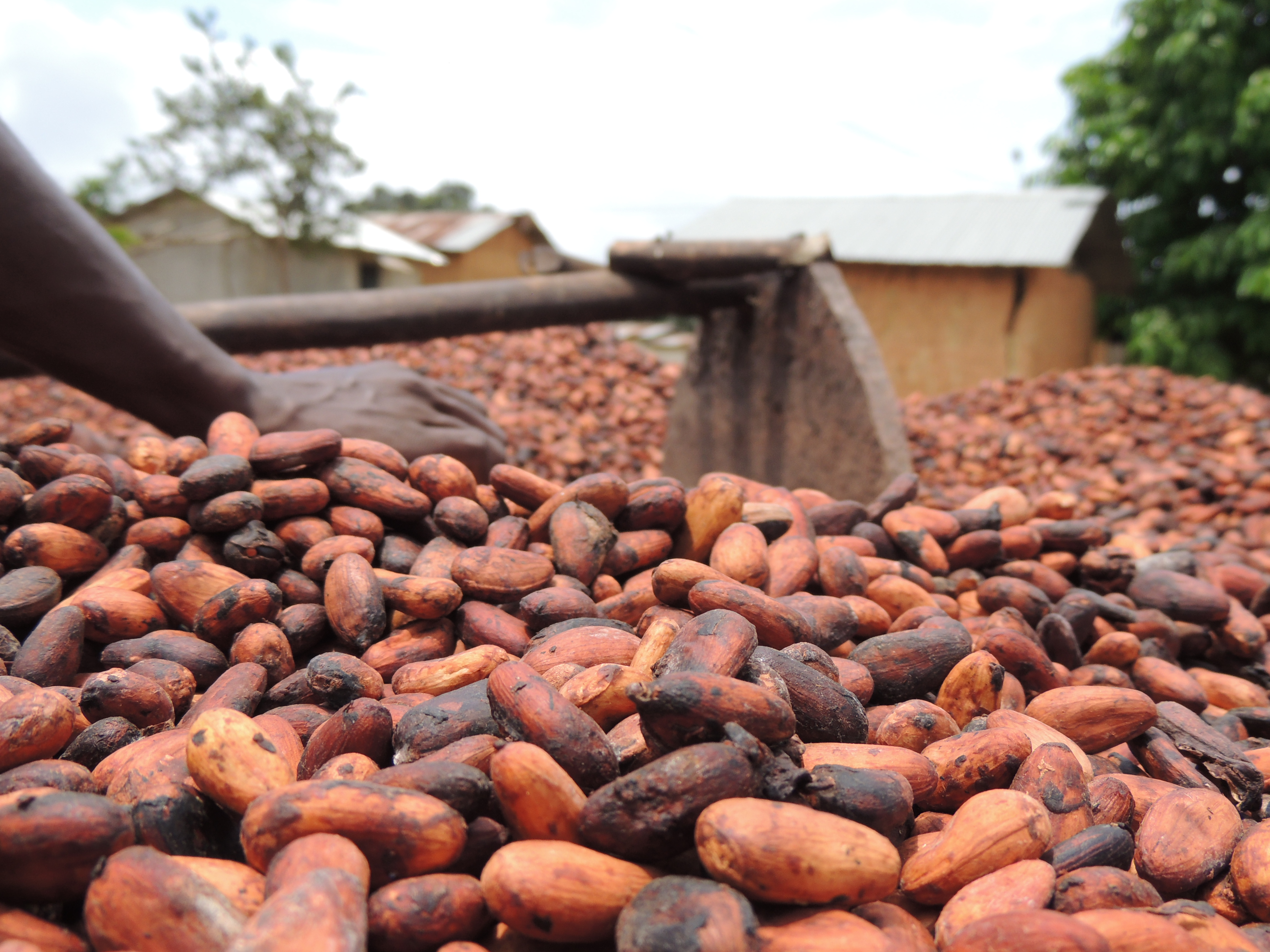
Ivorian cocoa farmer leaving cocoa beans to dry in the sun

Ivory Coast has, for the region, a relatively high income per capita (US$1,662 in 2017) and plays a key role in transit trade for neighbouring landlocked countries. As of the most recent survey in 2016, 46.1% of the population continues to be affected by multidimensional poverty. The country is the largest economy in the West African Economic and Monetary Union, constituting 40% of the monetary union's total GDP. Ivory Coast is the fourth-largest exporter of general goods in sub-Saharan Africa (following South Africa, Nigeria, and Angola).

The country is the world's largest exporter of cocoa beans. In 2009, cocoa-bean farmers earned $2.53 billion for cocoa exports and were projected to produce 630,000 metric tons in 2013. Ivory Coast also has 100,000 rubber farmers who earned a total of $105 million in 2012.

Close ties to France since independence in 1960, diversification of agricultural exports, and encouragement of foreign investment have been factors in economic growth. In recent years, Ivory Coast has been subject to greater competition and falling prices in the global marketplace for its primary crops of coffee and cocoa. That, compounded with high internal corruption, makes life difficult for the grower, those exporting into foreign markets, and the labour force; instances of indentured labour have been reported in the country's cocoa and coffee production in every edition of the U.S. Department of Labor's List of Goods Produced by Child Labor or Forced Labor since 2009.

Ivory Coast's economy has grown faster than that of most other African countries since independence. One possible reason for this might be taxes on exported agriculture. Ivory Coast, Nigeria, and Kenya were exceptions as their rulers were themselves large cash-crop producers, and the newly independent countries desisted from imposing penal rates of taxation on exported agriculture. As such, their economies did well.

Around 7.5 million people made up the workforce in 2009. The workforce took a hit, especially in the private sector, during the early 2000s with numerous economic crises since 1999. Furthermore, these crises caused companies to close and move locations, especially in the tourism industry, and transit and banking companies. Decreasing job markets posed a huge issue as unemployment rates grew. Unemployment rates rose to 9.4% in 2012. Solutions proposed to decrease unemployment included diversifying jobs in small trade. This division of work encouraged farmers and the agricultural sector. Self-employment policy, established by the Ivorian government, allowed for very strong growth in the field with an increase of 142% in seven years from 1995.

== Demographics ==
Historical population
Year	Pop.	±% p.a.
1960	3,709,000	—
1975	6,709,600	+4.08%
1988	10,815,694	+3.78%
1998	15,366,672	+3.32%
2014	22,671,331	+2.56%
2021	29,389,150	+3.48%
2024	31,500,000	+2.76%
Source: 1960 UN estimate, 1975–1998 censuses, 2014 census, 2021 census, 2024 estimate.

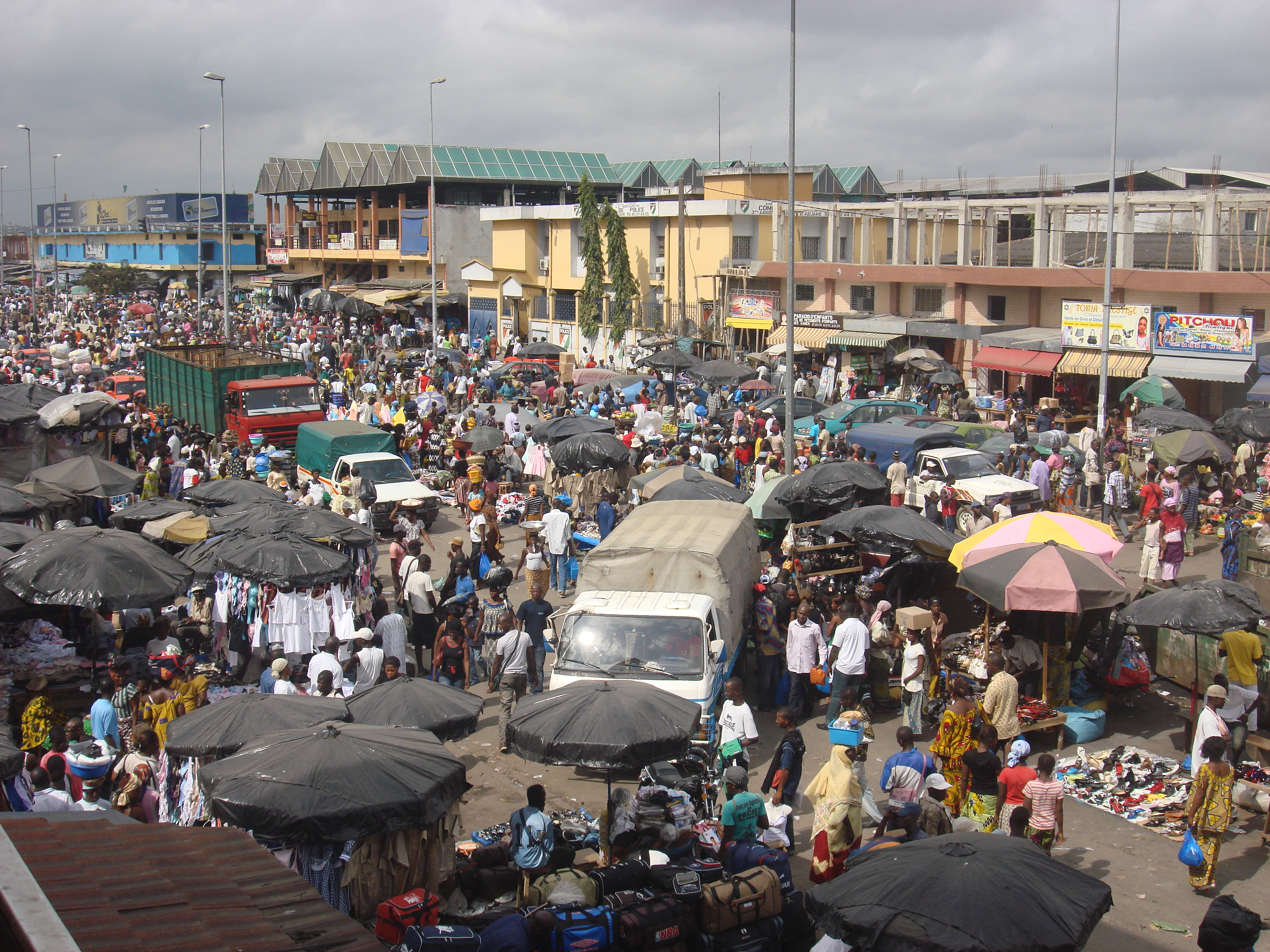
Congestion at a market in Abidjan

According to the 14 December 2021 census, the population was 29,389,150, up from 22,671,331 at the 2014 census. The first national census in 1975 counted 6.7 million inhabitants. According to a Demographic and Health Surveys nationwide survey, the total fertility rate stood at 4.3 children per woman in 2021 (with 3.6 in urban areas and 5.3 in rural areas), down from 5.0 children per woman in 2012.

=== Languages ===
It is estimated that 78 languages are spoken in Ivory Coast. French, the official language, is taught in schools and serves as a lingua franca. A semi-creolised form of French, known as Nouchi, has emerged in Abidjan in recent years and spread among the younger generation. One of the most common indigenous languages is Dyula, which acts as a trade language in much of the country, particularly in the north, and is mutually intelligible with other Manding languages widely spoken in neighbouring countries.

=== Ethnic groups ===
Macroethnic groupings of the citizen population in the country include the Akan (38.0%), Voltaic or Gur (22.0%), Northern Mandés (22.0%), Kru-speaking peoples (9.1%), Southern Mandés (8.6%), and others (0.3%, including naturalised Ivorian citizens). Most of these categories are subdivided into different ethnicities. For example, the Akan grouping includes the Baoulé, the Voltaic category includes the Senufo, the Northern Mande category includes the Koyakaa and the Maninka, the Kru category includes the Bété and the Kru, and the Southern Mande category includes the Yacouba.

About 78% of the population are considered Ivorian citizens. Since Ivory Coast has established itself as one of the most successful West African nations, about 22% of the population (c. 6.4 million) consists mostly of workers from nearby countries such as Burkina Faso (4 million), Mali (1.1 million), Guinea (290,000), and Niger (270,000). Many foreigners are also of non-African origin, including French, Lebanese (100,000), Vietnamese, and Spanish citizens, as well as Evangelical missionaries from the United States and Canada. In November 2004, around 10,000 French and other foreign nationals evacuated Ivory Coast due to attacks from pro-government youth militias. In 2021, people of European origin in Ivory Coast were estimated to number 24,178 people. Aside from French nationals, native-born descendants of French settlers who arrived during the country's colonial period are present.

According to the UNHCR, Ivory Coast is home to one of Africa's largest stateless populations, with over 930,000 people in the country at risk of statelessness as of 2025. Ivory Coast is a signatory to the UN Statelessness Convention and has established legal procedures to facilitate access to nationality for stateless persons. Additionally, Ivory Coast hosts around 168,000 refugees and 25,000 asylum seekers from neighbouring countries primarily as a consequence of the armed conflict in the Sahel, which has resulted in refugee movement from Burkina Faso, Benin, and Togo.

=== Religion ===
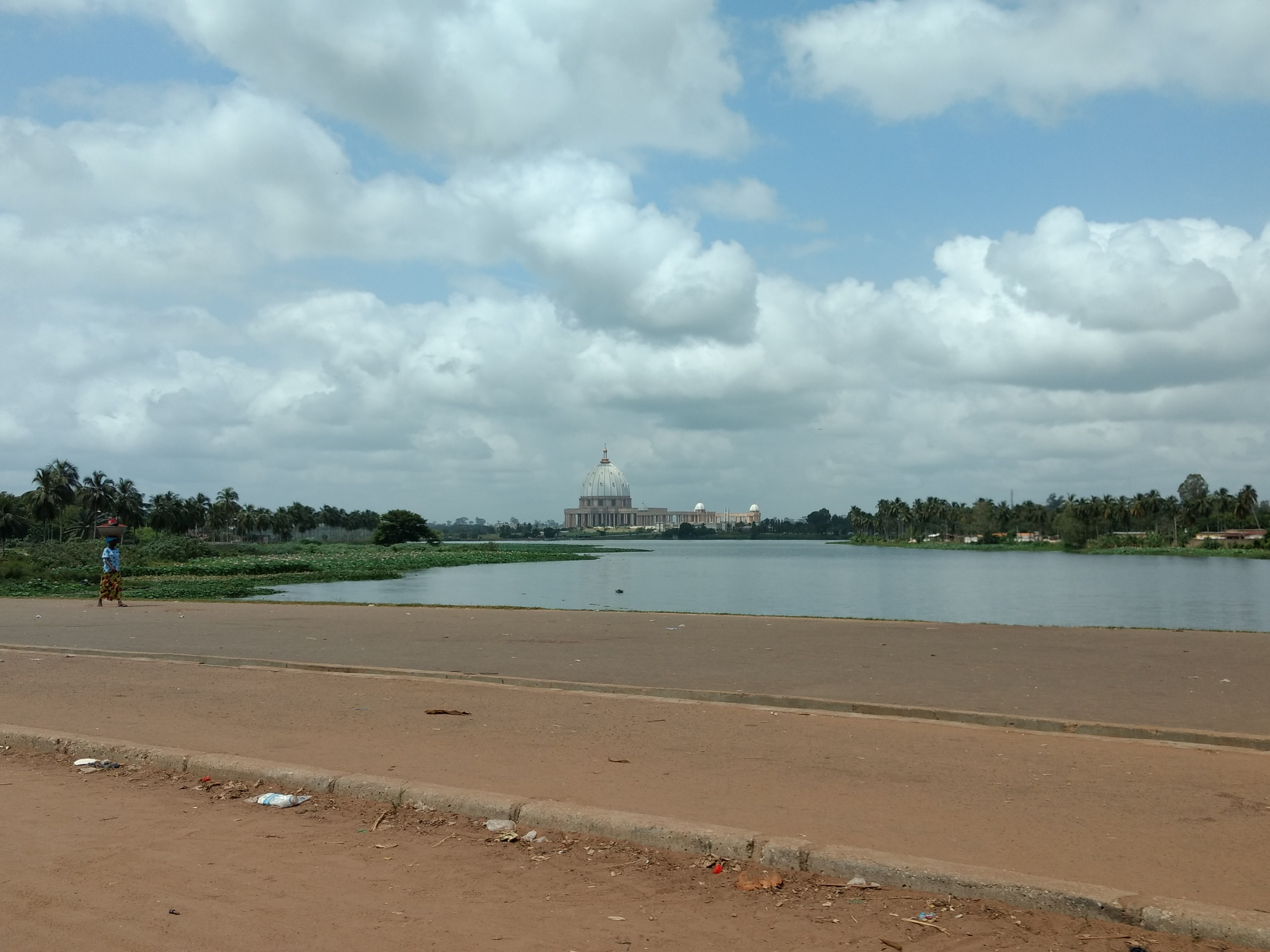
Basilica of Our Lady of Peace in the capital city Yamoussoukro, one of the largest churches in the world

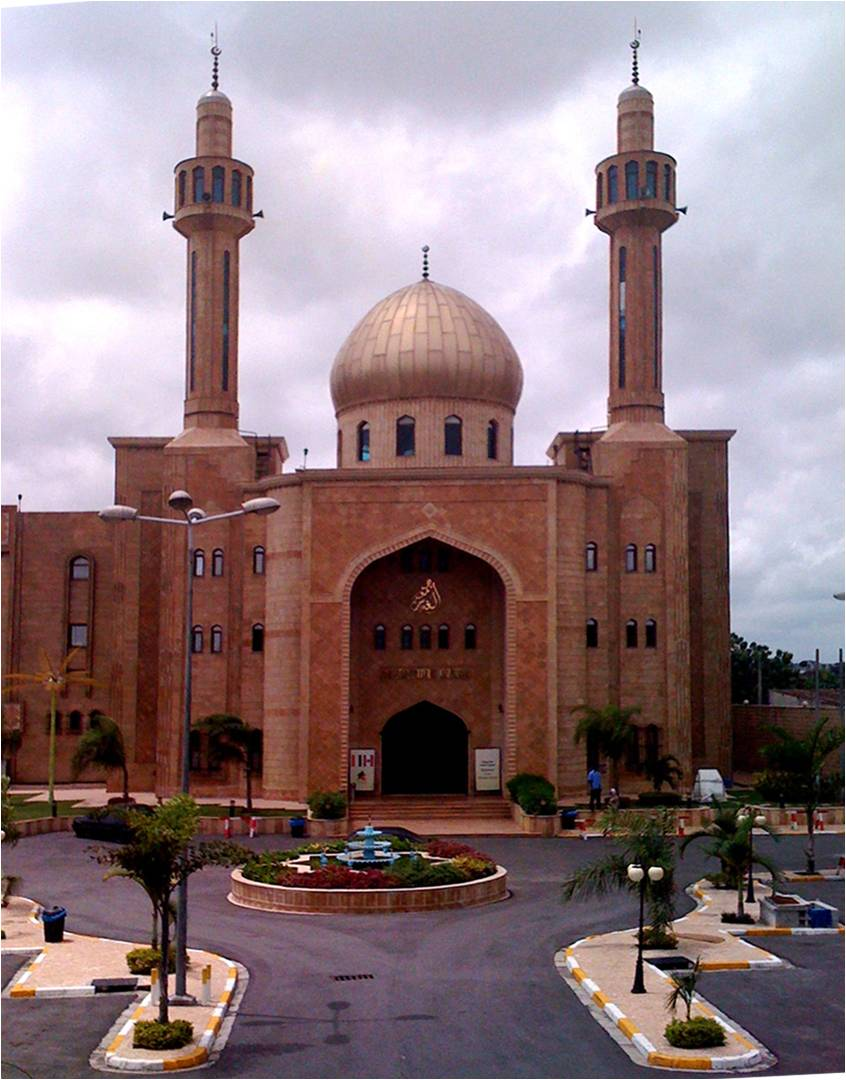
Central mosque in Marcory

Ivory Coast has a religiously diverse population. According to the latest 2021 census data, adherents of Islam (mainly Sunni) represented 42.5% of the total population, while followers of Christianity comprised 39.8% of the population, including Protestantism (22.8%) and Roman Catholicism (17.0%). An additional 12.6% of the population identified as irreligious, while 2.2% reported following animism (traditional African religions), 0.7% another religion, and 2.2% did not state their religion in the census. Excluding those who did not state their religion, the population was 43.5% Muslim, 40.7% Christian, 12.9% not religious, 2.2% animist, and 0.7% adherent of another religion. Between the censuses of 1998 and 2021, the Muslim population of Ivory Coast grew by 110%, whereas the Christian population grew by 150%; meanwhile, the animist population experienced a decline of 65.5%.

Yamoussoukro is home to the largest church building in the world, the Basilica of Our Lady of Peace.

=== Health ===
Life expectancy at birth was 42 for males in 2004; for females it was 47. Infant mortality was 118 of 1000 live births. Twelve physicians are available per 100,000 people. About a quarter of the population lives below the international poverty line of US$1.25 a day. About 36% of women have undergone female genital mutilation. According to 2010 estimates, Ivory Coast has the 27th-highest maternal mortality rate in the world. The HIV/AIDS rate was 19th-highest in the world, estimated in 2012 at 3.20% among adults aged 15–49 years.

=== Education ===
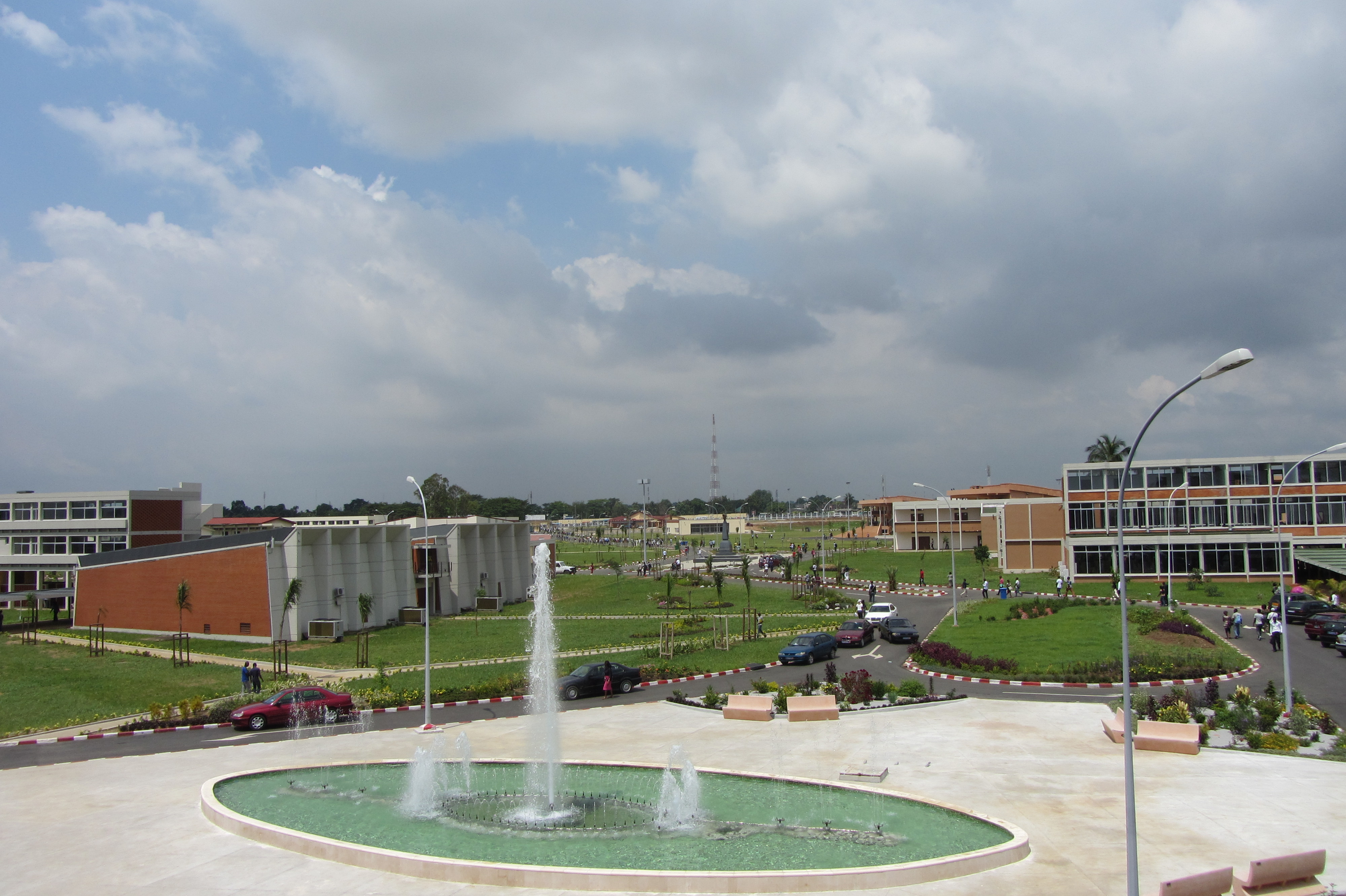
The campus of the Université de Cocody

Among sub-Saharan African countries, Ivory Coast has one of the highest literacy rates. According to The World Factbook, in 2019, 89.9% of the population aged 15 and over could read and write. A large part of the adult population, in particular women, is illiterate. Many children between 6 and 10-years-old are not enrolled in school. The majority of students in secondary education are male. At the end of secondary education, students can sit for the baccalauréat examination. Universities include Université Félix Houphouët-Boigny in Abidjan and the Université Alassane Ouattara in Bouaké.

=== Science and technology ===
According to the Ministry of Higher Education and Scientific Research, Ivory Coast devotes about 0.13% of GDP to GERD. Apart from low investment, other challenges include inadequate scientific equipment, the fragmentation of research organizations and a failure to exploit and protect research results. Ivory Coast was ranked 110th in the Global Innovation Index in 2025, down from 103rd in 2019. The share of the National Development Plan for 2012–2015 that is devoted to scientific research remains modest. Within the section on greater wealth creation and social equity (63.8% of the total budget for the Plan), just 1.2% is allocated to scientific research. Twenty-four national research programmes group public and private research and training institutions around a common research theme. These programmes correspond to eight priority sectors for 2012–2015, namely: health, raw materials, agriculture, culture, environment, governance, mining and energy; and technology.

== Culture ==
=== Media ===
As of 2026, the country had about 190 radio stations. Only in 2019 was the first privately owned TV station allowed to compete with the government Radiodiffusion télévision ivoirienne (RTI); as of 2026 there are three. Audiovisual communications are regulated by the government's Haute Autorité de la Communication Audiovisuelle (HACA). Newspaper sales are declining and some are opening or even moving to online platforms; newspapers can be and frequently are suspended. Investigative reporters often face threats and arrests. Print and online media are regulated by the National Press Authority (ANP).

=== Music ===
Each of the ethnic groups in Ivory Coast has its own music genres, most showing strong vocal polyphony. Talking drums are common, especially among the Appolo, and polyrhythms, another African characteristic, are found throughout Ivory Coast being especially common in the southwest. Popular music genres from Ivory Coast include zoblazo, zouglou, and Coupé-Décalé. A few Ivorian artists who have known international success are Magic Système, Alpha Blondy, Meiway, Dobet Gnahoré, Tiken Jah Fakoly, DJ Arafat, AfroB, Serge Beynaud and Christina Goh, of Ivorian descent.

=== Sport ===
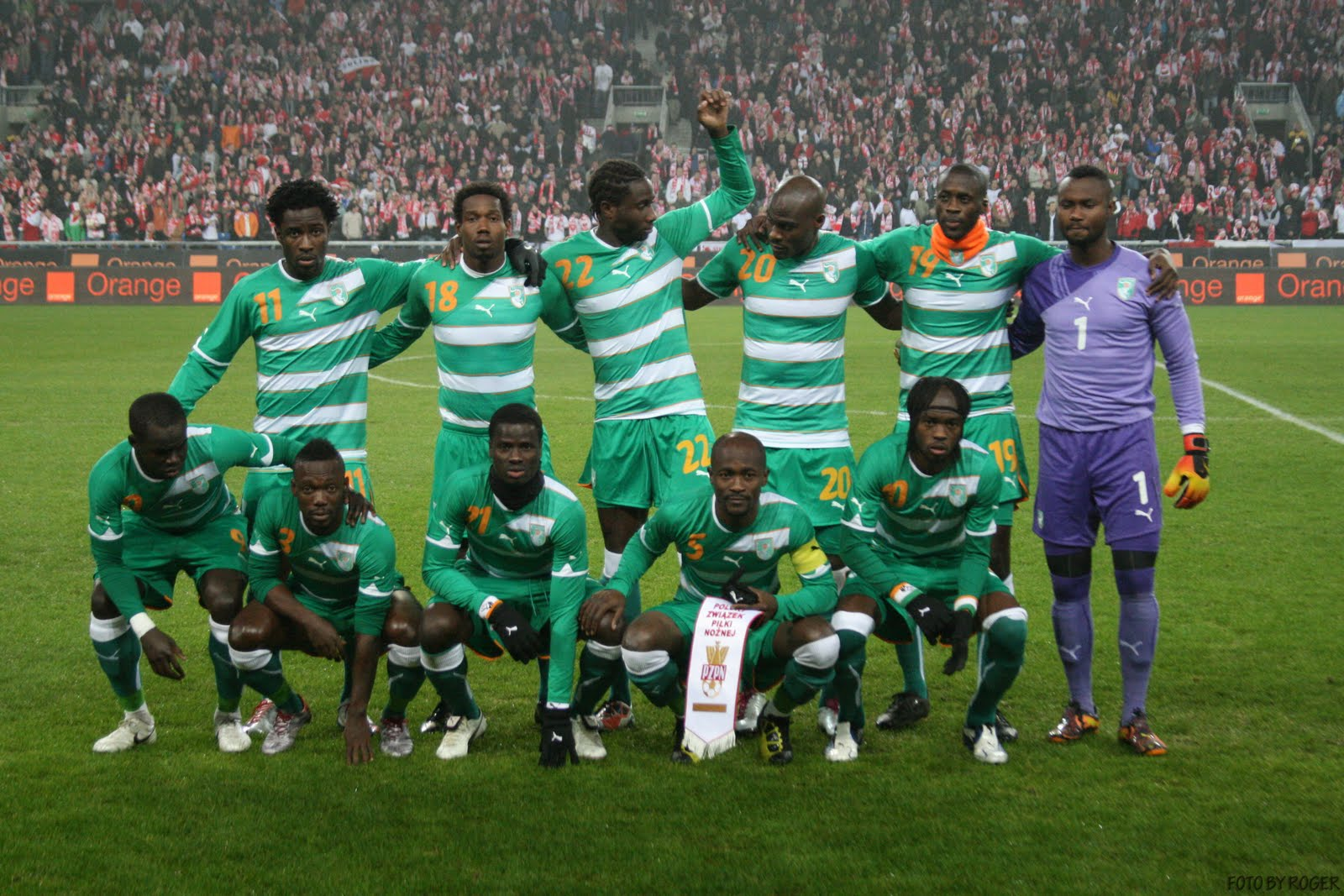
The Ivory Coast national football team

The most popular sport is association football. The men's national football team has played in the World Cup four times, in Germany 2006, South Africa 2010, Brazil 2014, and Canada-Mexico-United States in 2026, and has won three times in the Africa Cup of Nations, most recently when they hosted the 2023 edition. Ivory Coast has produced many well-known footballers like Didier Drogba and Yaya Touré. The women's football team played in the 2015 Women's World Cup in Canada. The country has been the host of several major African sporting events, with the most recent being the 2013 African Basketball Championship. In the past, the country hosted the 1984 African Cup of Nations, in which the Ivory Coast finished fifth, and the 1985 African Basketball Championship, where the national basketball team won the gold medal.

400m metre runner Gabriel Tiacoh won the silver medal in the men's 400 metres at the 1984 Olympics. The country hosted the 8th edition of Jeux de la Francophonie in 2017. In the sport of athletics, well known participants include Marie-Josée Ta Lou and Murielle Ahouré.

Rugby union is popular, and the national rugby union team qualified to play at the Rugby World Cup in South Africa in 1995. Ivory Coast has won three African Cup of Nation titles: one in 1992, another one in 2015, and the third one in 2024. Ivory Coast is known for Taekwondo with well-known competitors such as Cheick Cissé, Ruth Gbagbi, and Firmin Zokou.

=== Cuisine ===
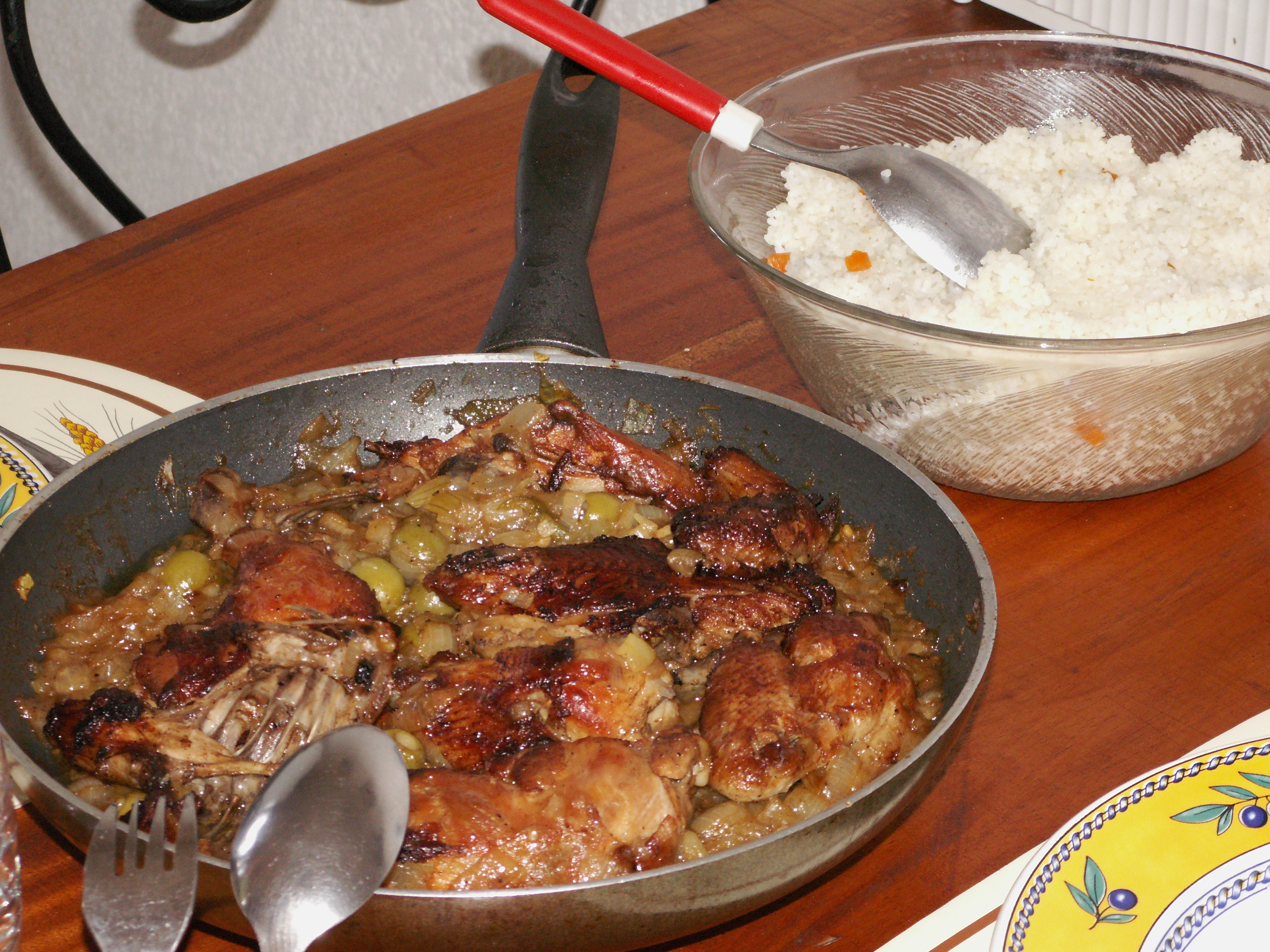
Yassa is a popular dish throughout West Africa prepared with chicken or fish. Chicken yassa is pictured.

Traditional cuisine is very similar to that of neighbouring countries in West Africa in its reliance on grains and tubers. Cassava and plantains are significant parts of Ivorian cuisine. A type of corn paste called aitiu is used to prepare corn balls, and peanuts are widely used in many dishes. Attiéké is a popular side dish made with grated cassava, a vegetable-based couscous. Common street food is alloco, plantain fried in palm oil, spiced with steamed onions and chili, and eaten along with grilled fish or boiled eggs. Chicken is commonly consumed and has a unique flavour because of its lean, low-fat mass in this region. Seafood includes tuna, sardines, shrimp, and bonito, which is similar to tuna. Mafé is a common dish consisting of meat in peanut sauce.

Slow-simmered stews with various ingredients are another common food staple. Kedjenou is a dish consisting of chicken and vegetables slow-cooked in a sealed pot with little or no added liquid, which concentrates the flavours of the chicken and vegetables and tenderises the chicken. It is usually cooked in a pottery jar called a canary, over a slow fire, or cooked in an oven. Bangui is a local palm wine.

Ivorians have a particular kind of small, open-air restaurant called a maquis, which is unique to the region. A maquis normally features braised chicken, and fish covered in onions and tomatoes served with acheke or kedjenou.

== See also ==
- Outline of Ivory Coast

== Bibliography ==
- Appiah, Anthony; Gates, Henry Louis, eds. (2010). Encyclopedia of Africa. Vol. 1. Oxford University Press. ISBN 978-0195337709. Archived from the original on 11 January 2023 – via Google Books.
- Baten, Jörg (2016). A History of the Global Economy. From 1500 to the Present. Cambridge University Press. ISBN 9781107507180.
- Auzias, Dominique; Labourdette, Jean-Paul (2008). Côte d'Ivoire. Petit futé Country Guides (in French). Petit Futé. ISBN 9782746924086.
- Blanchard, Pierre (1818). Le Voyageur de la jeunesse dans les quatre parties du monde (in French) (5th ed.). Paris: Le Prieur.
- n.t. Vol. 15 (11th ed.). 1911.
- David, Philippe (2000). La Côte d'Ivoire (in French) (KARTHALA Editions, 2009 ed.). Paris: Méridiens. ISBN 9782811101961.
- Duckett, William (1853). n.t. (in French). Vol. 6 (2nd ed.). Paris: Michel Lévy frères.
- Essegbey, George; Diaby, Nouhou; Konté, Almamy (2015). UNESCO Science Report: towards 2030 (PDF). Paris: UNESCO. ISBN 978-92-3-100129-1. Archived (PDF) from the original on 30 June 2017.
- Homans, Isaac Smith (1858). n.t. Vol. 1. New York: Harper & brothers.
- Human Development Report 2020 The Next Frontier: Human Development and the Anthropocene (PDF). United Nations Development Programme. 15 December 2020. ISBN 978-92-1-126442-5. Archived (PDF) from the original on 9 October 2022.
- International Institute for Strategic Studies (2012). Military Balance 2012. Routledge. ISBN 978-0-429-33356-9. OCLC 1147908458.
- Jessup, John E. (1998), An Encyclopedic Dictionary of Conflict and Conflict Resolution, 1945–1996, Westport, Connecticut: Greenwood Publishing Group, ISBN 978-0-313-28112-9, OCLC 37742322, archived from the original on 18 May 2024
- Kipré, Pierre (1992), Histoire de la Côte d'Ivoire (in French), Abidjan: Editions AMI, OCLC 33233462
- Lea, David; Rowe, Annamarie (2001). "Côte d'Ivoire". A Political Chronology of Africa. Political Chronologies of the World. Vol. 4. Taylor & Francis. ISBN 9781857431162.
- Lipski, John M. (2005). A History of Afro-Hispanic Language: Five Centuries, Five Continents. Cambridge University Press. ISBN 9780521822657.
- McGovern, Mike (2011). Making War in Côte d'Ivoire. University of Chicago Press. ISBN 978-0226514604.
- Ministry of Economy and Finances of the Republic of Côte d'Ivoire (2007), La Côte d'Ivoire en chiffres (in French), Abidjan: Dialogue Production, OCLC 173763995
- Mortimer, Edward (1969). France and the Africans 1944–1960 – A Political History. London: Faber & Faber. ISBN 0-571-08251-3. OCLC 31730.
- Plée, Victorine François (1868). "Côte des Dents où d'Ivoire". Peinture géographique du monde moderne: suivant l'ordre dans lequel il a été reconnu et decouvert (in French). Paris: Pigoreau.
- Rougerie, Gabriel (1978), L'Encyclopédie générale de la Côte d'Ivoire (in French), Abidjan: Nouvelles publishers africaines, ISBN 978-2-7236-0542-7, OCLC 5727980
- Thornton, John K. (1996). "The African background to American colonization". In Engerman, Stanley L.; Gallman, Robert E. (eds.). The Cambridge Economic History of the United States. Vol. 1. Cambridge University Press. ISBN 9780521394420.
- Vaissète, Jean Joseph (1755). Géographie historique, ecclesiastique et civile (in French). Vol. 11. Paris: chez Desaint & Saillant, J.-T. Herissant, J. Barois.
- Walckenaer, Charles-Athanase (1827). Histoire générale des voyages ou Nouvelle collection des relations de voyages par mer et par terre (in French). Vol. 8. Paris: Lefèvre.
- Warner, Rachel (1988). Historical Setting. Washington, D.C.: Federal Research Division, Library of Congress. OCLC 44238009. Archived from the original on 27 September 2021. This article incorporates text from this source, which is in the public domain.
