= Kawolo-Sobara =

- Village
- Location in Ivory Coast
- Coordinates: 8°18′N 4°31′W
- Country: Ivory Coast
- District: Vallée du Bandama
- Region: Hambol
- Department: Dabakala
- Sub-prefecture: Sokala-Sobara
- Time zone: UTC+0 (GMT)

Kawolo-Sobara is a group of six villages (Sobara, Kogodian, Konota, Mangorosso, Dioulasso, and Sandakoro) in central Ivory Coast. It is in the sub-prefecture of Sokala-Sobara, Dabakala Department, Hambol Region, Vallée du Bandama District, located 14 km from the town of Dabakala.

== Description ==
The population comprises about 5,000 Djimini people. Economic activity is exclusively concerned with agriculture and pastoralism, with intensive cultivation of cashews, yams, and peanuts.

Kawolo-Sobara was a commune until March 2012, when it became one of 1,126 communes nationwide that were abolished.
