= Namahounondougou =

Namahounondougou Namahounondougou-Sobara
- Village
- Location in Ivory Coast
- Coordinates: 8°8′N 4°8′W
- Country: Ivory Coast
- District: Vallée du Bandama
- Region: Hambol
- Department: Dabakala
- Sub-prefecture: Bassawa
- Time zone: UTC+0 (GMT)

Namahounondougou (also known as Namahounondougou-Sobara) is a village in northeastern Ivory Coast. It is in the sub-prefecture of Bassawa, Dabakala Department, Hambol Region, Vallée du Bandama District.

Namahounondougou was a commune until March 2012, when it became one of 1,126 communes nationwide that were abolished.
