= Lissolo-Sobara =

- Village
- Location in Ivory Coast
- Coordinates: 8°4′N 4°1′W
- Country: Ivory Coast
- District: Vallée du Bandama
- Region: Hambol
- Department: Dabakala
- Sub-prefecture: Bassawa
- Time zone: UTC+0 (GMT)

Lissolo-Sobara is a village in north-eastern Ivory Coast. It is in the sub-prefecture of Bassawa, Dabakala Department, Hambol Region, Vallée du Bandama District. Lissolo-Sobara is located near the tripoint of the Vallée du Bandama, Lacs, and Zanzan Districts.

Lissolo-Sobara was a commune until March 2012, when it became one of 1,126 communes nationwide that were abolished.
