= Finessiguédougou =

- Village
- Location in Ivory Coast
- Coordinates: 8°18′N 4°27′W
- Country: Ivory Coast
- District: Vallée du Bandama
- Region: Hambol
- Department: Dabakala
- Sub-prefecture: Dabakala
- Time zone: UTC+0 (GMT)

Finessiguédougou is a village in north-eastern Ivory Coast. It is in the sub-prefecture of Dabakala, Dabakala Department, Hambol Region, Vallée du Bandama District.

Finessiguédougou was a commune until March 2012, when it became one of 1,126 communes nationwide that were abolished.
