= Yoyaga Coulibaly =

Ivorian sprinter and politician

Personal information
- Nationality: Ivorian
- Born: 20 January 1939 (age 86)

Sport
- Sport: Sprinting
- Event: 400 metres

Yoyaga Coulibaly also known as Fatogoma (French: Coulibaly Yoyaga dit Fatogoma; born 20 January 1939) is a former Ivorian parliamentarian for the constituency of Boniérédougou, Foumbolo, Satama-Sokoro, and Satama-Sokoura, and a former sprinter who competed in the 400 metres at the 1964 Summer Olympics and the 1968 Summer Olympics.

== Personal life ==
Coulibaly was born on 20 January 1939 in Korhogo, Savanes District.

Coulibaly became the first Ivorian national technical director of the National Athletics Federation of Ivory Coast.

== Sport career ==
Coulibaly was a former Ivorian record-holder in the 400 m and was seeded in the 5th 400 m heat at the 1964 Olympics. He finished 7th in 48.8 seconds and did not advance to the quarter-finals.

At the 1968 Olympics, Coulibaly was seeded in the 7th 400 metres heat. He ran 50.11 seconds to place 8th in his heat and did not advance.
