= Kanagonon =

- Village
- Location in Ivory Coast
- Coordinates: 8°18′N 5°3′W
- Country: Ivory Coast
- District: Vallée du Bandama
- Region: Hambol
- Department: Katiola
- Sub-prefecture: Fronan
- Time zone: UTC+0 (GMT)

Kanagonon is a village in central Ivory Coast. It is in the sub-prefecture of Fronan, Katiola Department, Hambol Region, Vallée du Bandama District.

Kanagonon was a commune until March 2012, when it became one of 1,126 communes nationwide that were abolished.
