= Gbèkèkro =

Gbèkèkro Gbèkèkro-Noumousso; Gbèlèkoro
- Village
- Location in Ivory Coast
- Coordinates: 8°15′N 4°17′W
- Country: Ivory Coast
- District: Vallée du Bandama
- Region: Hambol
- Department: Dabakala
- Sub-prefecture: Yaossédougou
- Time zone: UTC+0 (GMT)

Gbèkèkro (also known as Gbèkèkro-Noumousso and also spelled Gbèlèkoro) is a village in north-eastern Ivory Coast. It is in the sub-prefecture of Yaossédougou, Dabakala Department, Hambol Region, Vallée du Bandama District.

Gbèkèkro was a commune until March 2012, when it became one of the 1,126 communes nationwide that were abolished.
