= Gbamélédougo =

Gbamélédougo Gbambélédougo
- Village
- Location in Ivory Coast
- Coordinates: 8°5′N 4°27′W
- Country: Ivory Coast
- District: Vallée du Bandama
- Region: Hambol
- Department: Dabakala
- Sub-prefecture: Satama-Sokoro
- Time zone: UTC+0 (GMT)

Gbamélédougo (also spelled Gbambélédougo) is a village in north-eastern Ivory Coast. It is in the sub-prefecture of Satama-Sokoro, Dabakala Department, Hambol Region, Vallée du Bandama District.

Gbamélédougo was a commune until March 2012, when it became one of 1,126 communes nationwide that were abolished.
