= M'Borla-Dioulasso =

- Village
- Location in Ivory Coast
- Coordinates: 8°28′N 4°29′W
- Country: Ivory Coast
- District: Vallée du Bandama
- Region: Hambol
- Department: Dabakala
- Sub-prefecture: Sokala-Sobara
- Time zone: UTC+0 (GMT)

M'Borla-Dioulasso is a village in north-eastern Ivory Coast. It is in the sub-prefecture of Sokala-Sobara, Dabakala Department, Hambol Region, Vallée du Bandama District.

M'Borla-Dioulasso was a commune until March 2012, when it became one of 1,126 communes nationwide that were abolished.
