= Sépikaha =

- Village
- Location in Ivory Coast
- Coordinates: 8°55′N 5°3′W
- Country: Ivory Coast
- District: Vallée du Bandama
- Region: Hambol
- Department: Niakaramadougou
- Sub-prefecture: Niédiékaha
- Time zone: UTC+0 (GMT)

Sépikaha is a village in northern Ivory Coast. It is in the sub-prefecture of Niédiékaha, Niakaramandougou Department, Hambol Region, Vallée du Bandama District.

Sépikaha was a commune until March 2012, when it became one of 1,126 communes nationwide that were abolished.
