= Satama =

The word satama is Finnish for harbor.

Satama may also refer to:

- Satama-Sokoro, a town in Côte d'Ivoire.
- Satama-Sokoura, a town in Côte d'Ivoire.
- Sosiaalikeskus Satama, a social center in Helsinki.
- Wanha Satama, an exhibition center in Helsinki.
