= Tiénindiéri =

Tiénindiéri Ténindiéri
- Village
- Location in Ivory Coast
- Coordinates: 8°46′N 5°35′W
- Country: Ivory Coast
- District: Vallée du Bandama
- Region: Hambol
- Department: Niakaramandougou
- Sub-prefecture: Tortiya
- Time zone: UTC+0 (GMT)

Tiénindiéri (also spelled Ténindiéri) is a village in northern Ivory Coast. It is in the sub-prefecture of Tortiya, Niakaramandougou Department, Hambol Region, Vallée du Bandama District.

Tiénindiéri was a commune until March 2012, when it became one of 1,126 communes nationwide that were abolished.
