= Nandjélé =

- Village
- Location in Ivory Coast
- Coordinates: 8°36′N 4°35′W
- Country: Ivory Coast
- District: Vallée du Bandama
- Region: Hambol
- Department: Dabakala
- Sub-prefecture: Foumbolo
- Time zone: UTC+0 (GMT)

Nandjélé is a village in northeastern Ivory Coast. It is in the sub-prefecture of Foumbolo, Dabakala Department, Hambol Region, Vallée du Bandama District.

Until 2012, Nandjélé was in the commune of Nandjélé-Ségbéré. In March 2012, Nandjélé-Ségbéré became one of 1,126 communes nationwide that were abolished.
