= Kanawolo =

- Village
- Location in Ivory Coast
- Coordinates: 8°47′N 5°18′W
- Country: Ivory Coast
- District: Vallée du Bandama
- Region: Hambol
- Department: Niakaramandougou
- Sub-prefecture: Niakaramandougou
- Time zone: UTC+0 (GMT)

Kanawolo is a village in north-central Ivory Coast. It is in the sub-prefecture of Niakaramandougou, Niakaramandougou Department, Hambol Region, Vallée du Bandama District.

Kanawolo was a commune until March 2012, when it became one of 1,126 communes nationwide that were abolished.
