= Tortiya =

- Town, sub-prefecture, and commune
- Location in Ivory Coast
- Coordinates: 8°46′N 5°41′W
- Country: Ivory Coast
- District: Vallée du Bandama
- Region: Hambol
- Department: Niakaramandougou

Population (2014)
  - Total: 22,124
- Time zone: UTC+0 (GMT)

Tortiya is a town in northern Ivory Coast. It is a sub-prefecture and commune of Niakaramandougou Department in Hambol Region, Vallée du Bandama District. The town sits just east of the border of Savanes District.

In 2014, the population of the sub-prefecture of Tortiya was 22,124.

== Villages ==
The 11 villages of the sub-prefecture of Tortiya and their population in 2014 are

1. Kationron (646)
2. Tortiya (15 998)
3. Zouaéri (242)
4. Allasso (306)
5. Gninlnafolokaha (892)
6. Lotialga (886)
7. Nabédjakaha (679)
8. Sangadjokaha (458)
9. Songorokaha (304)
10. Tiénindiéri (781)
11. Zanakaha (932)
