= Niéméné =

- Town and sub-prefecture
- Location in Ivory Coast
- Coordinates: 8°27′N 4°42′W
- Country: Ivory Coast
- District: Vallée du Bandama
- Region: Hambol
- Department: Dabakala

Population (2014)
  - Total: 15,689
- Time zone: UTC+0 (GMT)

Niéméné is a town in northeast Ivory Coast. It is a sub-prefecture of Dabakala Department in Hambol Region, Vallée du Bandama District.

Niéméné was a commune until March 2012, when it became one of 1,126 communes nationwide that were abolished.

In 2014, the population of the sub-prefecture of Niéméné was 15,698.

== Villages ==
The 17 villages of the sub-prefecture of Niéméné and their population in 2014 are:

1. Dienguesso (1,489)
2. Kognannan (230)
3. Kohouara (1,095)
4. Kohouara-Sokoura (700)
5. Lagbora (689)
6. Lahogora (828)
7. Naholo-Sobara (995)
8. Niéméné (2,974)
9. Pagala (439)
10. Pessandougou (440)
11. Ponon (1,199)
12. Segbèrè (795)
13. Sitiolo (959)
14. Souayeri (394)
15. Takana Dioulasso (553)
16. Tindikan Sofona (1,345)
17. Tinguédougou (574)
