= Arikokaha =

Arikokaha Arikikaha
- Town and sub-prefecture
- Location in Ivory Coast
- Coordinates: 8°47′N 5°12′W
- Country: Ivory Coast
- District: Vallée du Bandama
- Region: Hambol
- Department: Niakaramandougou

Population (2014)
  - Total: 7,416
- Time zone: UTC+0 (GMT)

Arikokaha (also spelled Arikikaha) is a town in north-central Ivory Coast. It is a sub-prefecture of Niakaramandougou Department in Hambol Region, Vallée du Bandama District.

Arikokaha was a commune until March 2012, when it became one of 1,126 communes nationwide that were abolished.

In 2014, the population of the sub-prefecture of Arikokaha was 7,416.

== Villages ==
The five villages of the sub-prefecture of Arikokaha and their population in 2014 are:

1. Arikokaha (1,233)
2. Badiokaha (1,374)
3. Fononkaha (566)
4. Nangoniékaha (3,099)
5. Niangbo (1,144)
