= Tendéné-Bambarasso =

- Town and sub-prefecture
- Location in Ivory Coast
- Coordinates: 8°28′N 4°14′W
- Country: Ivory Coast
- District: Vallée du Bandama
- Region: Hambol
- Department: Dabakala

Population (2014)
  - Total: 8,769
- Time zone: UTC+0 (GMT)

Tendéné-Bambarasso is a town in northeast Ivory Coast. It is a sub-prefecture of Dabakala Department in Hambol Region, Vallée du Bandama District.

Tendéné-Bambarasso was a commune until March 2012, when it became one of 1,126 communes nationwide that were abolished.

In 2014, the population of the sub-prefecture of Sokala-Sobara was 16,389.

== Villages ==
The 15 villages of the sub-prefecture of Sokala-Sobara and their population in 2014 are:

1. Dendjougoudougou (236)
2. Dyendagana (347)
3. Faboudougou (97)
4. Kadiéoulé-Lolézo (284)
5. Kadiéoulé-Sobara (486)
6. Kadiéoulé-Sourdian (1,009)
7. Kongobanadougou (1,263)
8. M'borla-Bambarasso (622)
9. M'borla-Dioulasso (4,067)
10. N'gorla (922)
11. Ouasségbogo (1,138)
12. Sokala-Djélisso (1,024)
13. Sokala-Sobara (2,475)
14. Soungbonon-Bambarasso (1,328)
15. Soungbonon-Dioulasso (1,091)
