= Timbe =

Timbe may refer to:

- Timbé people, an ethnic group of Brazil
- Timbé language, a language of Brazil
- Timbe language, a language of Papua New Guinea
- Timbé, Ivory Coast, a town in Ivory Coast
- Timbé do Sul, a municipality in Brazil

== See also ==
- Tinbe (disambiguation)
- Tembe (disambiguation)
