= Niakaramandougou =

- Town, sub-prefecture, and commune
- Nickname: Niakara
- Location in Ivory Coast
- Coordinates: 8°40′N 5°17′W
- Country: Ivory Coast
- District: Vallée du Bandama
- Region: Hambol
- Department: Niakaramandougou

Area
  - Total: 2,780 km^{2} (1,070 sq mi)

Population (2021 census)
  - Total: 78,301
  - Density: 28.2/km^{2} (72.9/sq mi)
  - Town: 16,812
- (2014 census)
- Time zone: UTC+0 (GMT)

Niakaramandougou (often referred to as Niakara) is a town in north-central Ivory Coast. It is a sub-prefecture of and the seat of Niakaramandougou Department in Hambol Region, Vallée du Bandama District. Niakaramandougou is also a commune.

In 2021, the population of the sub-prefecture of Niakaramandougou was 78,301.

== Villages ==
The 15 villages of the sub-prefecture of Niakara and their population in 2014

1. Angolokaha (1 208)
2. Folofonkaha (1 978)
3. Niakara (16 812)
4. Kafiné (3 165)
5. Kanawolo (3 940)
6. Kiohan (411)
7. Latokaha (5 713)
8. Longo (3 498)
9. Ouréguékaha (3 177)
10. Pékaha (750)
11. Pétionnara (4 031)
12. Pétonkaha (1 448)
13. Sérigbokaha (740)
14. Sinkaha (2 025)
15. Timorokaha (928)
