= Badikaha =

- Town and sub-prefecture
- Location in Ivory Coast
- Coordinates: 9°12′N 5°10′W
- Country: Ivory Coast
- District: Vallée du Bandama
- Region: Hambol
- Department: Niakaramandougou

Population (2014)
  - Total: 21,441
- Time zone: UTC+0 (GMT)

Badikaha is a town in northern Ivory Coast. It is a sub-prefecture of Niakaramandougou Department in Hambol Region, Vallée du Bandama District.

Badikaha was a commune until March 2012, when it became one of 1,126 communes nationwide that were abolished.

In 2014, the population of the sub-prefecture of Badikaha was 21,441.

== Villages ==
The 11 villages of the sub-prefecture of Badikaha and their population in 2014 are

1. Badikaha (4,932)
2. Ferme Cemencière (94)
3. Kouroukouna (1,101)
4. Kouroukouna-Gare (384)
5. Nayolkaha (802)
6. Pangalakaha (348)
7. Sucaf Ci Extension (5,667)
8. Sucaf Ci Village 1 (1,085)
9. Sucaf Ci Village 2 (3,400)
10. Sucaf Ci Village 3 (1,110)
11. Sucaf Cité Usine (1,797)
12. Tiengarakaha (721)
