= Yaossédougou =

- Town and sub-prefecture
- Location in Ivory Coast
- Coordinates: 8°14′N 4°15′W
- Country: Ivory Coast
- District: Vallée du Bandama
- Region: Hambol
- Department: Dabakala

Population (2014)
  - Total: 4,421
- Time zone: UTC+0 (GMT)

Yaossédougou is a town in northeast Ivory Coast. It is a sub-prefecture of Dabakala Department in Hambol Region, Vallée du Bandama District.

Yaossédougou was a commune until March 2012, when it became one of 1,126 communes nationwide that were abolished.

In 2014, the population of the sub-prefecture of Tendéné-Bambarasso was 8,769.

== Villages ==
The 13 villages of the sub-prefecture of Tendéné-Bambarasso and their population in 2014 are

1. Bangolo (900)
2. Bidiala-Sobara (725)
3. Bobosso (841)
4. Goumbodougou (568)
5. Kaniéguéma (706)
6. Kossaba (311)
7. Nakala (511)
8. Sorolo (742)
9. Tédiala-Bambarasso (591)
10. Tédiala-Noumousso (184)
11. Tendéné-Bambarasso (1,363)
12. Toupé (184)
13. Wendèné (1,143)
