= Tinbe =

Tinbe may refer to:

- Tinbé, Ivory Coast, a town
- Tinbe, the shield used in the tinbe-rochin weapon system of Okinawa, Japan

== See also ==
- Timbe (disambiguation)
