= Fronan =

- Town, sub-prefecture, and commune
- Location in Ivory Coast
- Coordinates: 8°18′N 5°9′W
- Country: Ivory Coast
- District: Vallée du Bandama
- Region: Hambol
- Department: Katiola

Area
  - Total: 1,510 km^{2} (580 sq mi)

Population (2021 census)
  - Total: 56,796
  - Density: 37.6/km^{2} (97.4/sq mi)
  - Town: 16,647
- (2014 census)
- Time zone: UTC+0 (GMT)

Fronan is a town in central Ivory Coast. It is a sub-prefecture and commune of Katiola Department in Hambol Region, Vallée du Bandama District.

In 2021, the population of the sub-prefecture of Fronan was 56,796.

== Villages ==
The 8 villages of the sub-prefecture of Fronan and their population in 2014 are:

1. Darakokaha (5 966)
2. Fronan (16 647)
3. Naplékaha (2 751)
4. Ouanadiékaha (3 801)
5. Tiengala (2 033)
6. Kanangonon (4 649)
7. Tafolo (2 411)
8. Takala (659)
