= Foumbolo =

- Town, sub-prefecture, and commune
- Location in Ivory Coast
- Coordinates: 8°38′N 4°39′W
- Country: Ivory Coast
- District: Vallée du Bandama
- Region: Hambol
- Department: Dabakala

Population (2014)
  - Total: 18,808
- Time zone: UTC+0 (GMT)

Foumbolo is a town in northeast Ivory Coast. It is a sub-prefecture and commune of Dabakala Department in Hambol Region, Vallée du Bandama District.

In 2014, the population of the sub-prefecture of Foumbolo was 18,808.

== Villages ==
The 23 villages of the sub-prefecture of Foumbolo and their population in 2014 are:

1. Bala (692)
2. Djolo (318)
3. Findéné (401)
4. Foumbolo (3,188)
5. Kaléguéra (962)
6. Kaniéné (1,173)
7. Kapolokoro (1,575)
8. Kapélé Sokoura (193)
9. Kapélé-Sokoro (282)
10. Kassemblé (404)
11. Kassoungbonon (517)
12. Kolo (612)
13. Landédougou (898)
14. Littiari (720)
15. Nambayérédougou (198)
16. Nandjélé-Ségbéré (1,031)
17. Nassoulo (1,109)
18. Niangourougbonon (1,226)
19. Sarala (979)
20. Sendré-Sokoro (1,017)
21. Sendré-Sokoura (953)
22. Tahogora (146)
23. Tiobolo (214)
