= Niédiékaha =

- Town and sub-prefecture
- Location in Ivory Coast
- Coordinates: 8°55′N 5°10′W
- Country: Ivory Coast
- District: Vallée du Bandama
- Region: Hambol
- Department: Niakaramandougou

Population (2014)
  - Total: 9,648
- Time zone: UTC+0 (GMT)

Niédiékaha is a town in northern Ivory Coast. It is a sub-prefecture of Niakaramandougou Department in Hambol Region, Vallée du Bandama District.

Niédiékaha was a commune until March 2012, when it became one of 1,126 communes nationwide that were abolished.

In 2014, the population of the sub-prefecture of Niédiékaha was 9,648.

== Villages ==
The seven villages of the sub-prefecture of Niédiékaha and their population in 2014 are:

1. Doussoulokaha (825)
2. Kolokaha (1,825)
3. Koulokaha (1,217)
4. Nambanakaha (844)
5. Niédékaha (2,113)
6. Niérétenkaha (188)
7. Sépikaha (2,636)
