= Vallée du Bandama Region =

Coordinates: 8°15′N 4°50′W

Vallée du Bandama Region Région de la Vallée du Bandama
- Defunct region of Ivory Coast
- 1997–2011
- Location of Vallée du Bandama Region in Ivory Coast
- Capital: Bouaké
- Area
- 28,518 km^{2} (11,011 sq mi)
- History
  - Established as a first-level subdivision: 1997
  - Disestablished: 2011
- Today part of: Vallée du Bandama District

Vallée du Bandama Region is a defunct region of Ivory Coast. From 1997 to 2011, it was a first-level subdivision region. The region's capital was Bouaké and its area was 28,518 km². Since 2011, the area formerly encompassed by the region is co-extensive with Vallée du Bandama District.

== Administrative divisions ==
At the time of its dissolution, Vallée du Bandama Region was divided into seven departments: Béoumi, Botro, Bouaké, Dabakala, Katiola, Niakaramandougou, and Sakassou.

== Abolition ==
Vallée du Bandama Region was abolished as part of the 2011 administrative reorganisation of the subdivisions of Ivory Coast. The area formerly encompassed by the region is now Vallée du Bandama District.
