= Bassawa =

- Town, sub-prefecture, and commune
- Location in Ivory Coast
- Coordinates: 8°3′N 4°6′W
- Country: Ivory Coast
- District: Vallée du Bandama
- Region: Hambol
- Department: Dabakala

Population (2014)
  - Total: 16,323
- Time zone: UTC+0 (GMT)

Bassawa is a town in northeast Ivory Coast. It is a sub-prefecture and commune of Dabakala Department in Hambol Region, Vallée du Bandama District. The town is three kilometres north of the border of Lacs District.

In 2014, the population of the sub-prefecture of Bassawa was 16,323.

== Villages ==
The 22 villages of the sub-prefecture of Bassawa and their population in 2014 are:

1. Namagnondougou (772)
2. Bassawa (2 033)
3. Kongodjan (762)
4. Bobosso (690)
5. Diembressédougou (1 980)
6. Douadiori (521)
7. Gbaméguédougou (227)
8. Karagono-Sobara (1 256)
9. Kombalasso (992)
10. Kouloumiera (590)
11. Ligboro (396)
12. Lissolo-Sobara (1 008)
13. M'bornon (684)
14. Namahounondougou (1 288)
15. Ouorognagbélé (220)
16. Sangbélédougou (543)
17. Sawariko (97)
18. Sirakoro (364)
19. Téplégnédougou (416)
20. Tonfoin (330)
21. Wandrana (571)
22. Yeyaradougou (583)
