= Ruoholahti shopping centre =

Shopping centre in Helsinki, Finland

Coordinates: 60°09′49″N 24°54′37″E

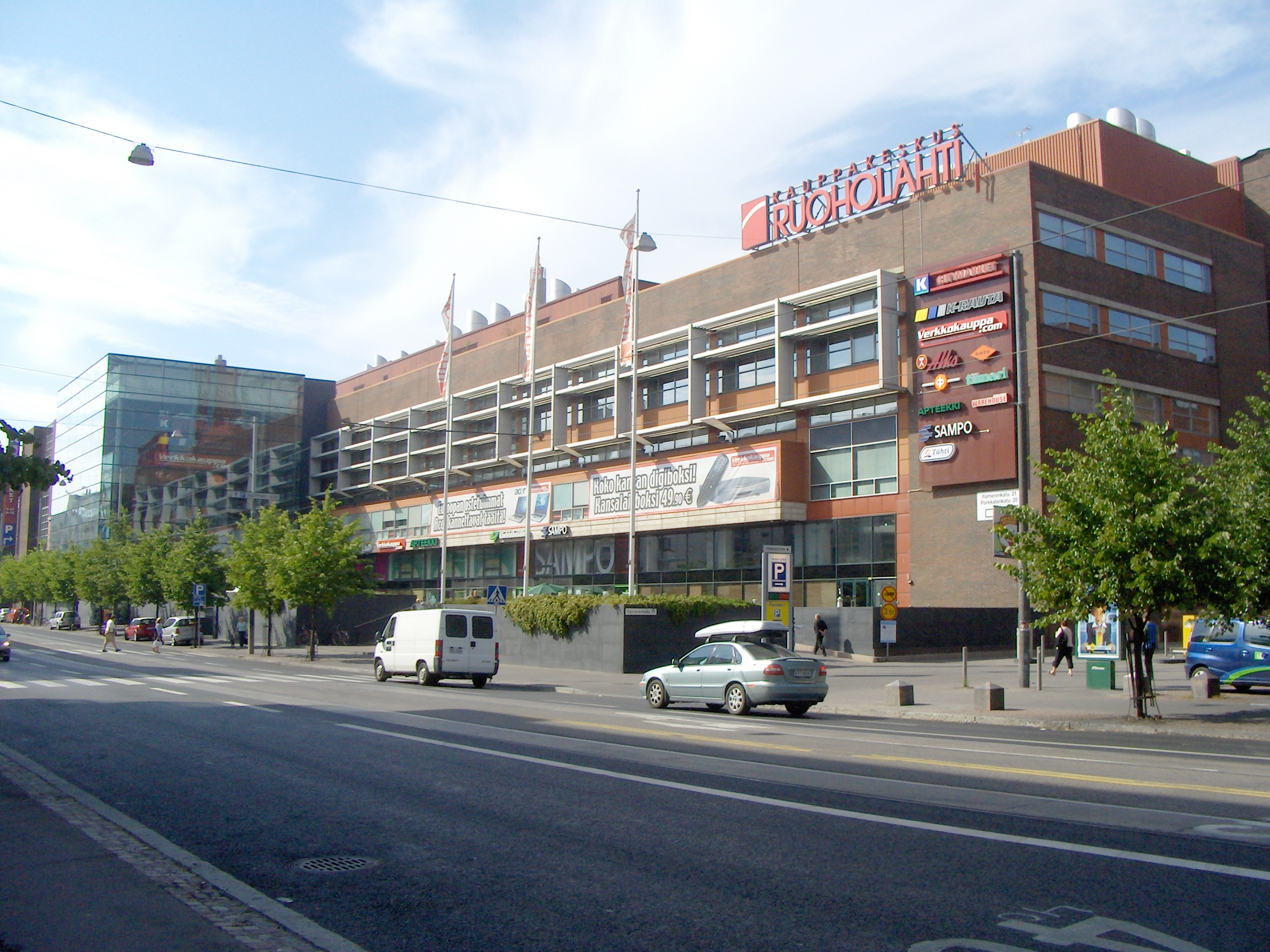
The Ruoholahti shopping centre.

The Ruoholahti shopping centre is a shopping centre in the district of Ruoholahti, Helsinki, Finland. It is located in the premises of a former Alko bottling facility, where it was opened in 2003.

The shopping centre includes about 20 businesses, of which the largest are K-Citymarket, K-Rauta, Tokmanni and Alko. Verkkokauppa.com, Finland's largest electronics store, was located in the shopping centre for eight years until it moved to the neighbouring district of Jätkäsaari in November 2011. The shopping centre also includes offices of several companies and various restaurants, a pharmacy and specialist stores.

There is a parking garage located next to the shopping centre, with 1500 parking places.

As a remnant of Alko's history in the building, there is a tunnel, closed to the general public, underneath the building leading to the Helsinki Court House. The tunnel serves as an air raid shelter.

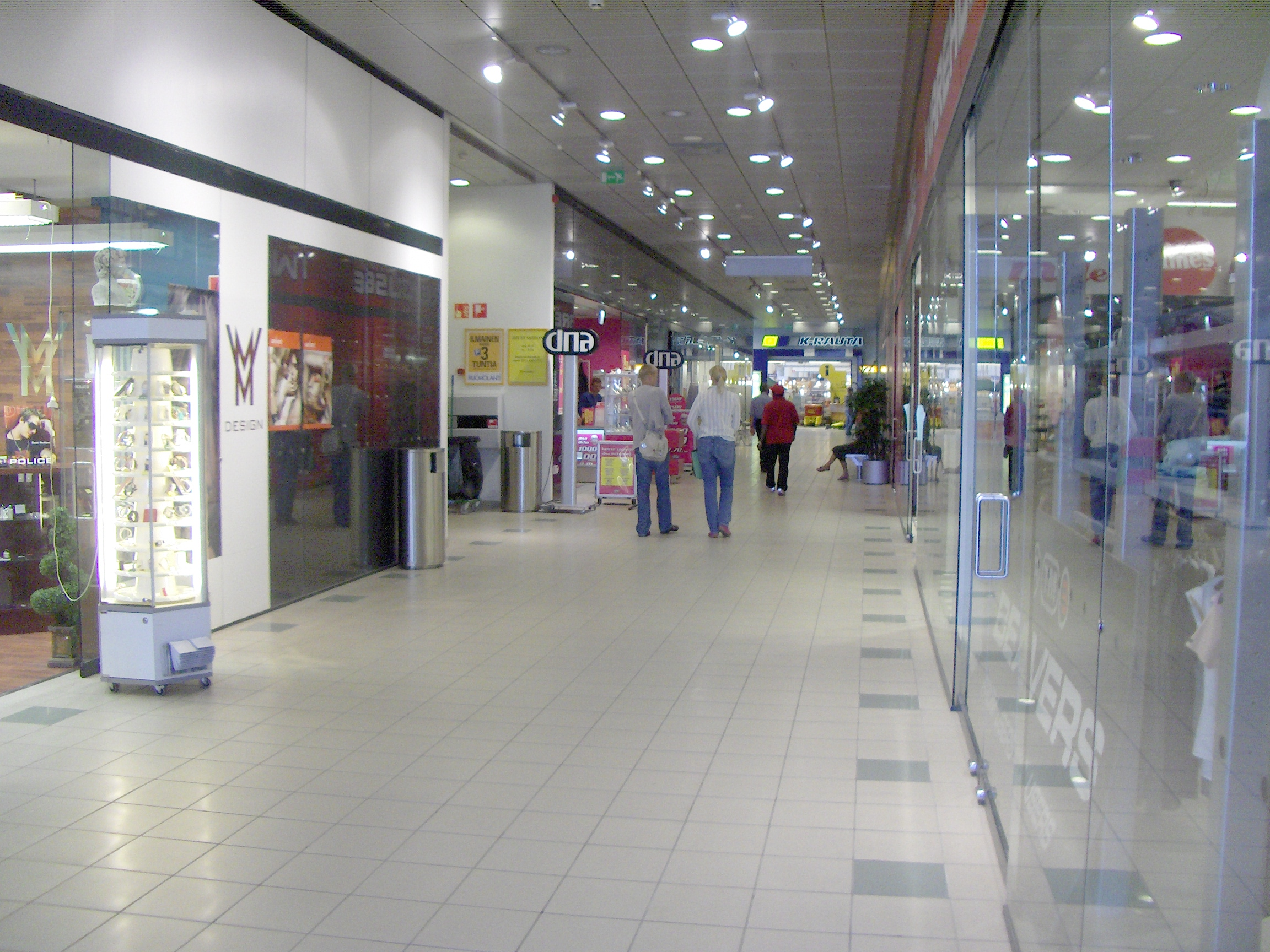

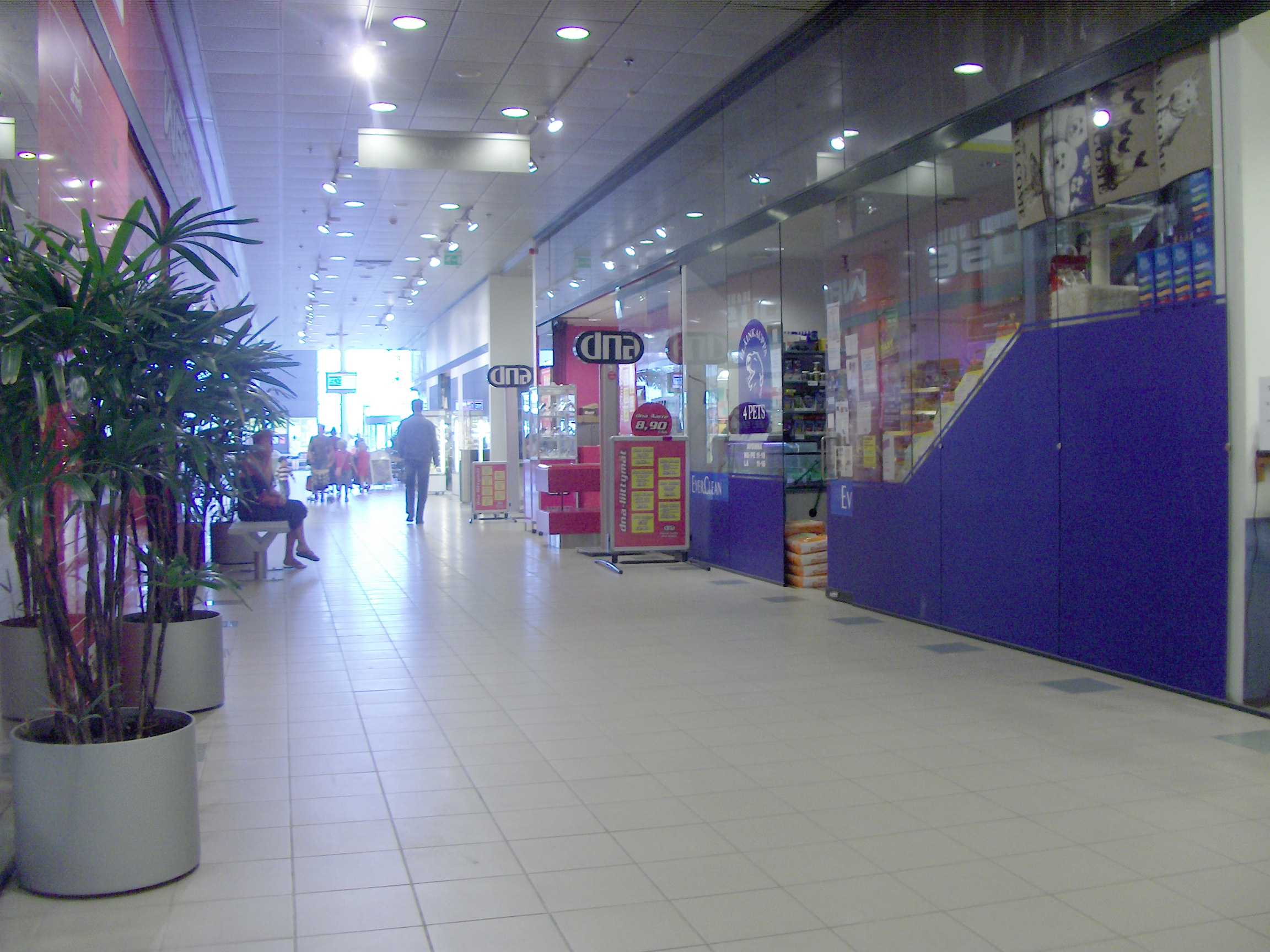

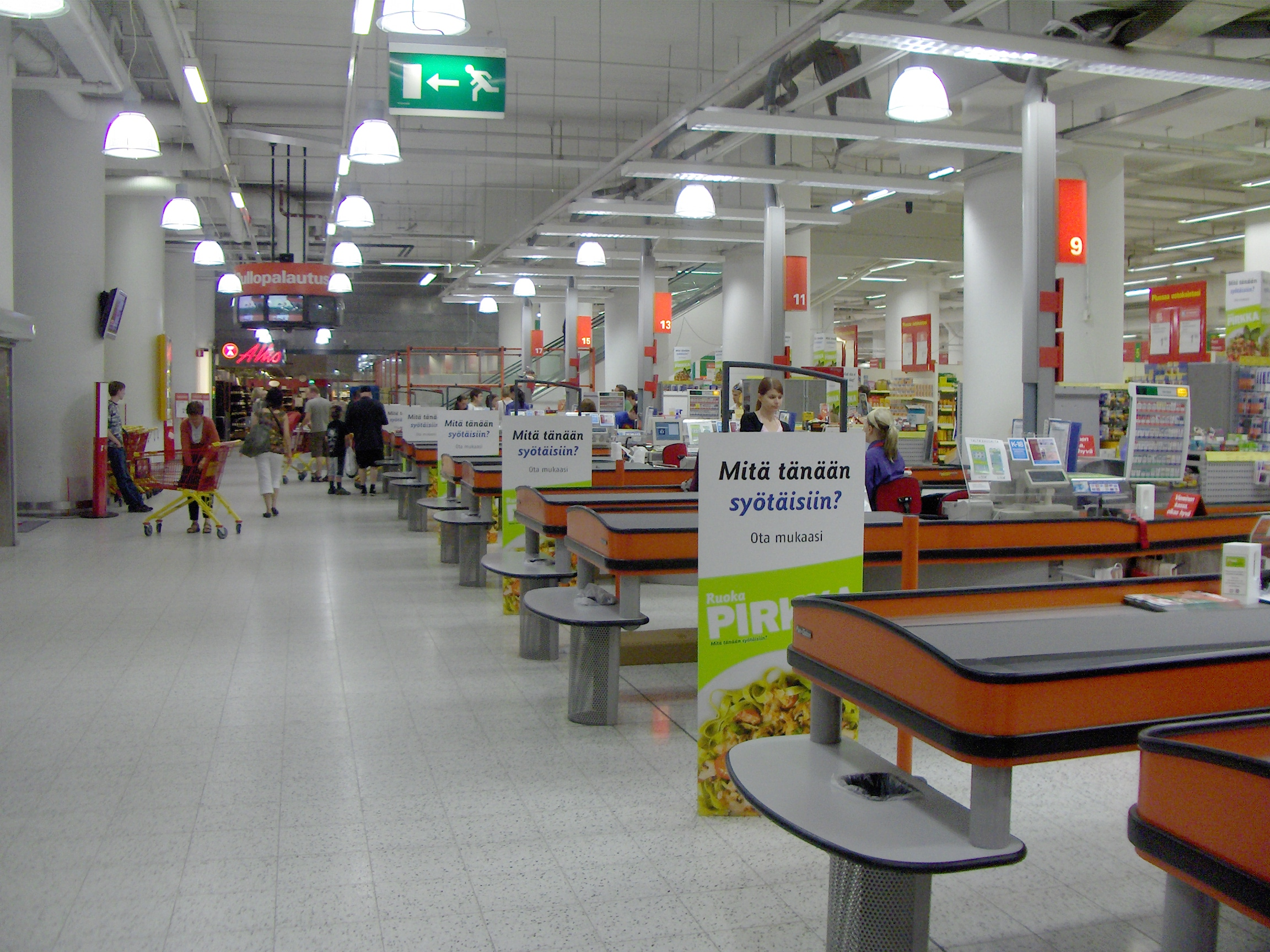
K-Citymarket is located at an underground floor

== Sources ==
- Finnish Shopping Centers 2016, Finnish Central Trade Association. Accessed on 2 August 2017.
- Kauppakeskukset, Finnish Central Trade Association. Accessed on 22 July 2021.
