= Ruoholahti =

Quarter in Länsisatama, Helsinki, Finland

Coordinates: 60°09′43.20″N 24°54′50.40″E

Location of Ruoholahti quarter within Helsinki highlighted in red, rest of the Länsisatama district in light red.

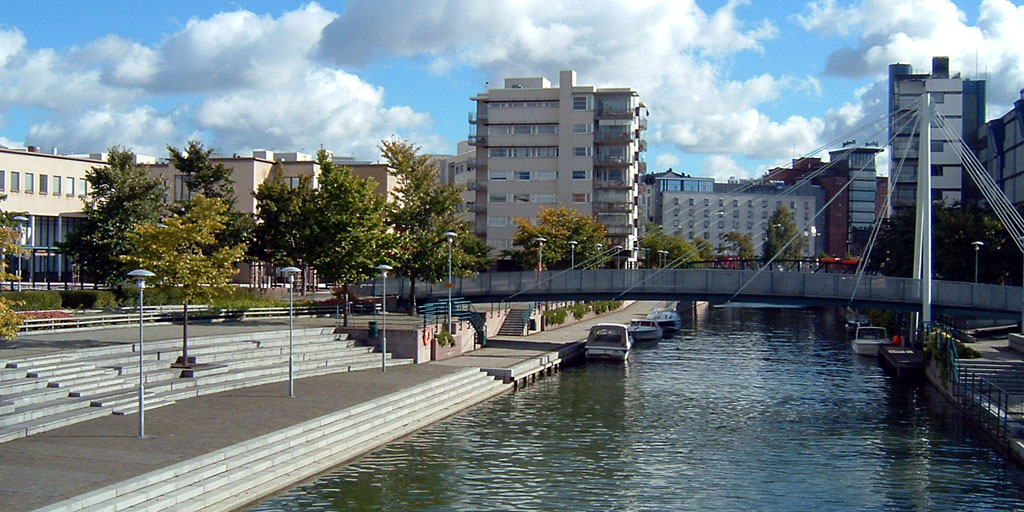
The Ruoholahti canal

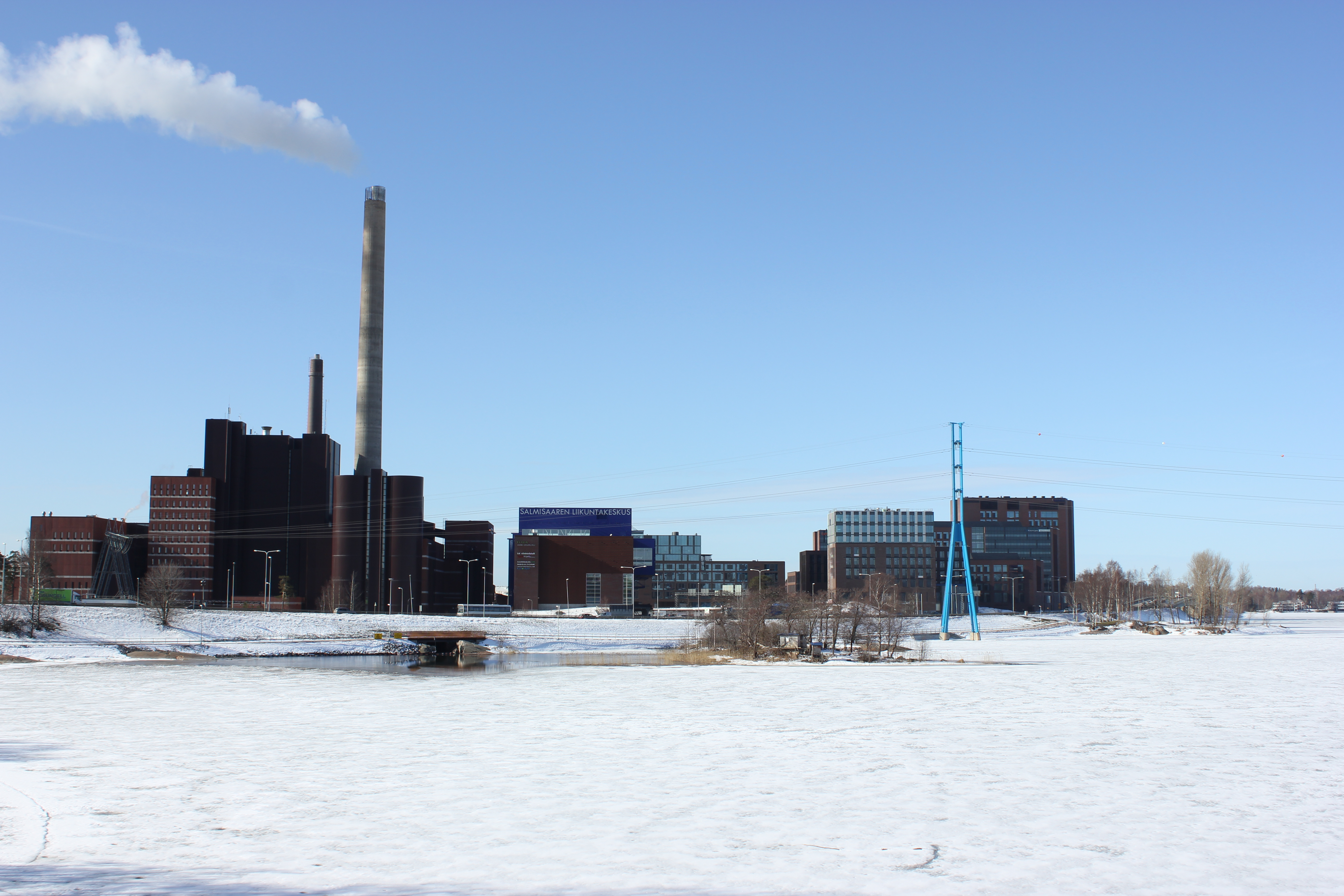
Ruoholahti district viewed from the north

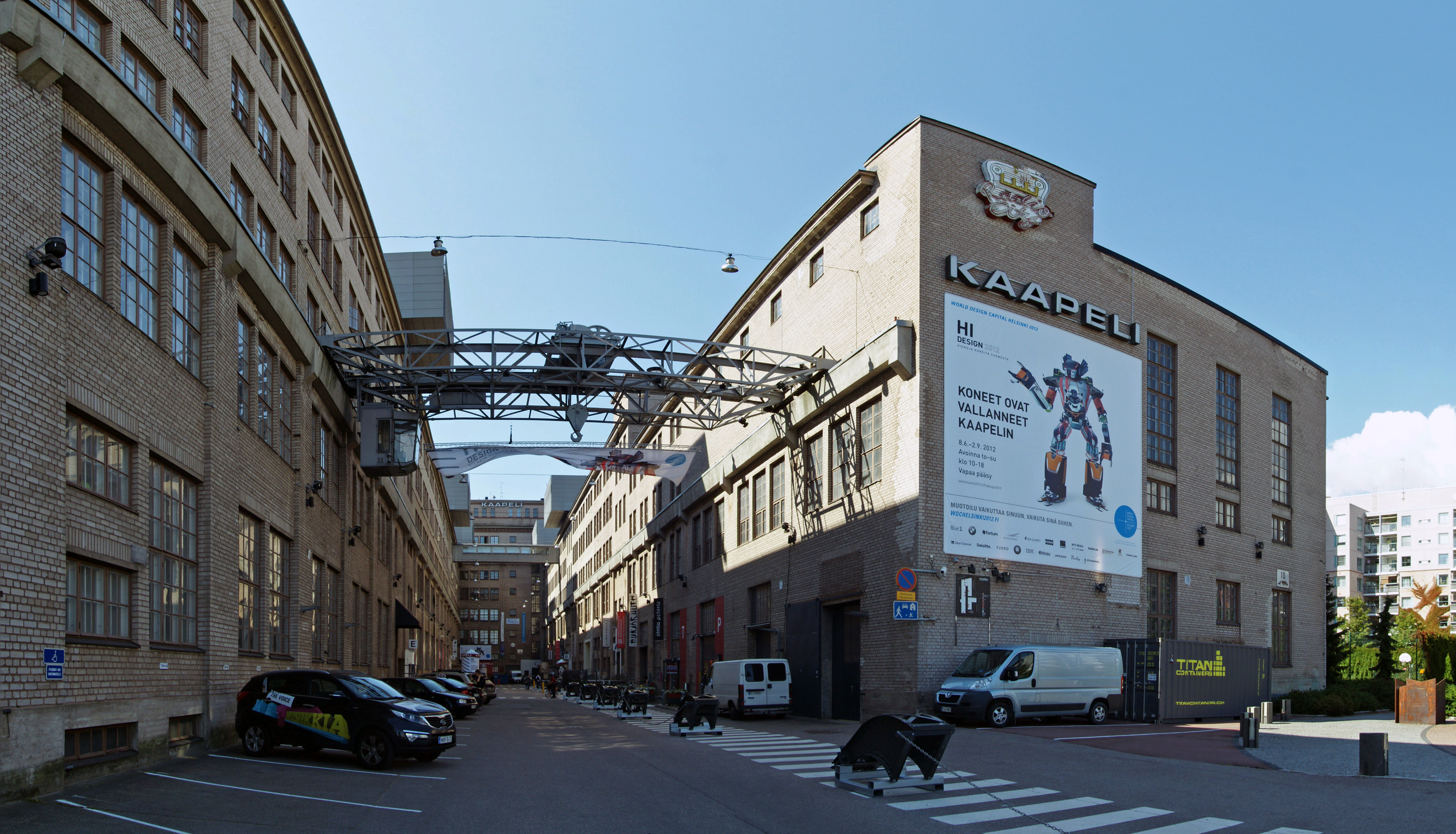
Kaapelitehdas (Cable Factory) culture centre

Ruoholahti (Finnish: [ˈruo̯hoˌlɑhti]; Swedish: Gräsviken; both meaning "Grass Bay") is a quarter in Helsinki, part of the Länsisatama neighbourhood and Kampinmalmi district. It is located in the southwestern part of the central city area of Helsinki, close to the Lauttasaari island, and it functions as the principal connection between the Helsinki city centre and the city of Espoo to the west. As of 2005 Ruoholahti is inhabited by approx. 3300 people. The Länsisatama port is also situated in Ruoholahti.

== History ==
The Ruoholahti area was created in the 1910s by connecting several small islands with earth fill. Its purpose was to accommodate the above-mentioned port. In the 1940s there also developed a small industrial district whose most notable buildings were the cable factory (Kaapelitehdas) of Nokia (which later became a cultural centre when Nokia gave up cable manufacturing and moved on to telecommunications), the headquarters of the Finnish government-owned alcohol enterprise Alko (transformed in 2002 into the Ruoholahti shopping centre), and the legendary Lepakko or Lepakkoluola (Bat cave), an old warehouse building used in 1967–1979 as emergency accommodation for homeless alcoholics and then, from 1979 to 1999 as an independent centre of youth culture from 1979 to 1999 (it was demolished to make way for an office building). In the 1960s the Länsiväylä highway (part of the Finnish national road 51) was built through Ruoholahti to connect Helsinki to southern Espoo via Lauttasaari.

A planning competition for the future of the area had been held in the middle 1980s. The area started changing significantly in 1991 when the construction of a new residential and office area began. The most striking of the office buildings was the High Tech Centre (HTC), designed by architect Kai Wartiainen and completed in 2001. The Helsinki Metro was extended to Ruoholahti in 1993. A short canal was built through the area to reinforce the image of a maritime district. Nokia returned to the area in 1999, when a new research centre was opened, designed by architect Tuomo Siitonen.

== Future ==
As a part of the Kampinmalmi area and for its great location near the Helsinki city center, Ruoholahti is a vivid and easy area to live and work. There are lot of parks and kindergartens, so the area is very popular among the families. Ruoholahti has its own school: Ruoholahden Ala-aste which is now facing a positive challenge to fulfil the needs of its expanding neighbourhood Jätkäsaari. Jätkäsaari got its own school in autumn 2017 - first it only served first and second graders, but in 2019 there was a promise of Jätkäsaari primary and secondary school.

Ruoholahti now competes with Jätkäsaari area and there are many everyday services, shops, restaurants, coffee shops and one can participate in sports, study music in Ruoholahden Konservatorio or explore arts in Kaapelitehdas. Ruoholahti-Jätkäsaari has its own choir, own football teams (operated by PPJ) and many local activities. Ruoholahti and Jätkäsaari area is an optimal area to live for people in all ages.

Ruoholahti is also known as a business center, many succeed brands have an office in Ruoholahti - just to mention Supercell and Huawei.

In the 2017 municipal elections, the Greens party led in Ruoholahti.

== Gallery ==
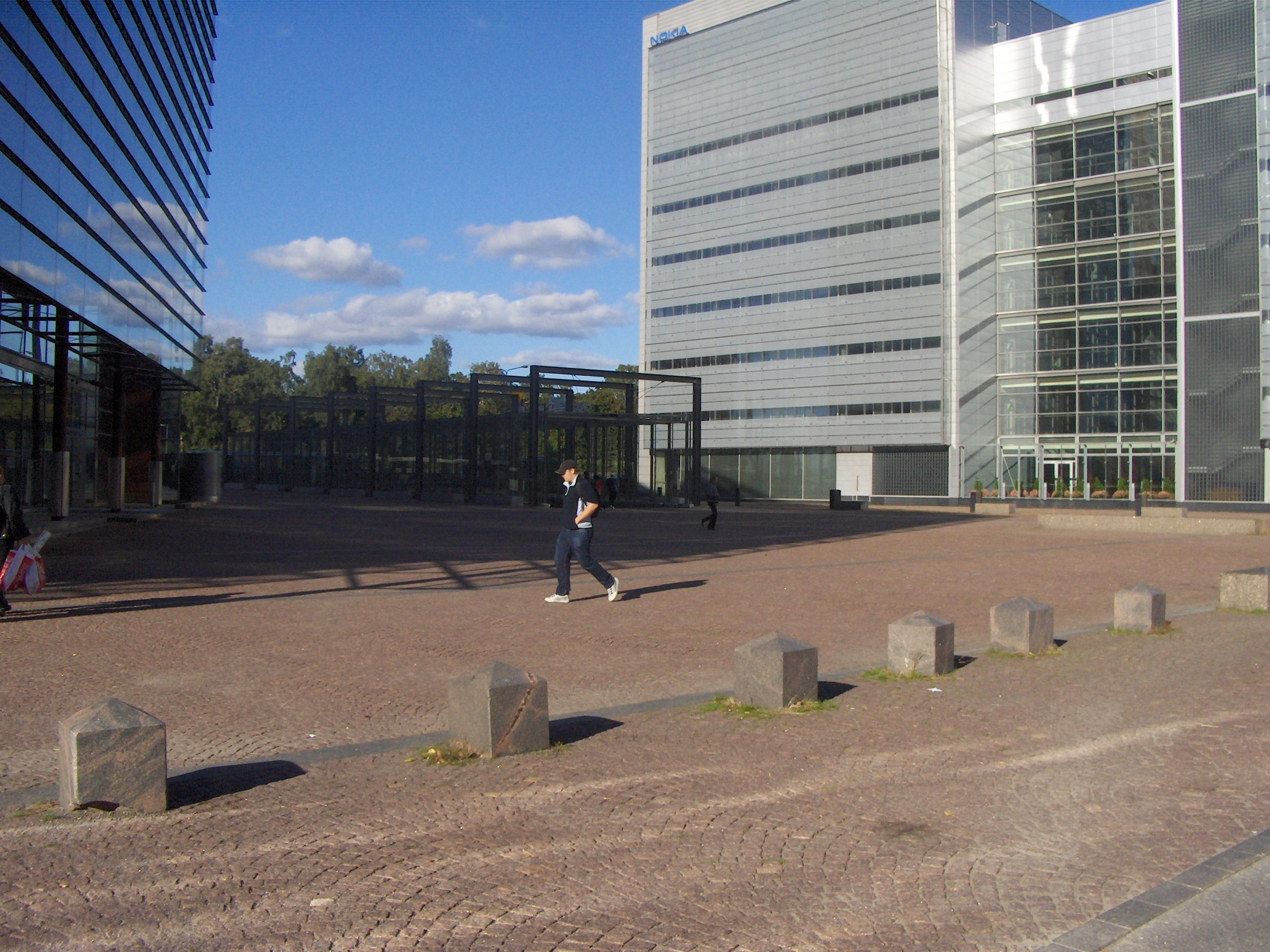
Itämerentori plaza

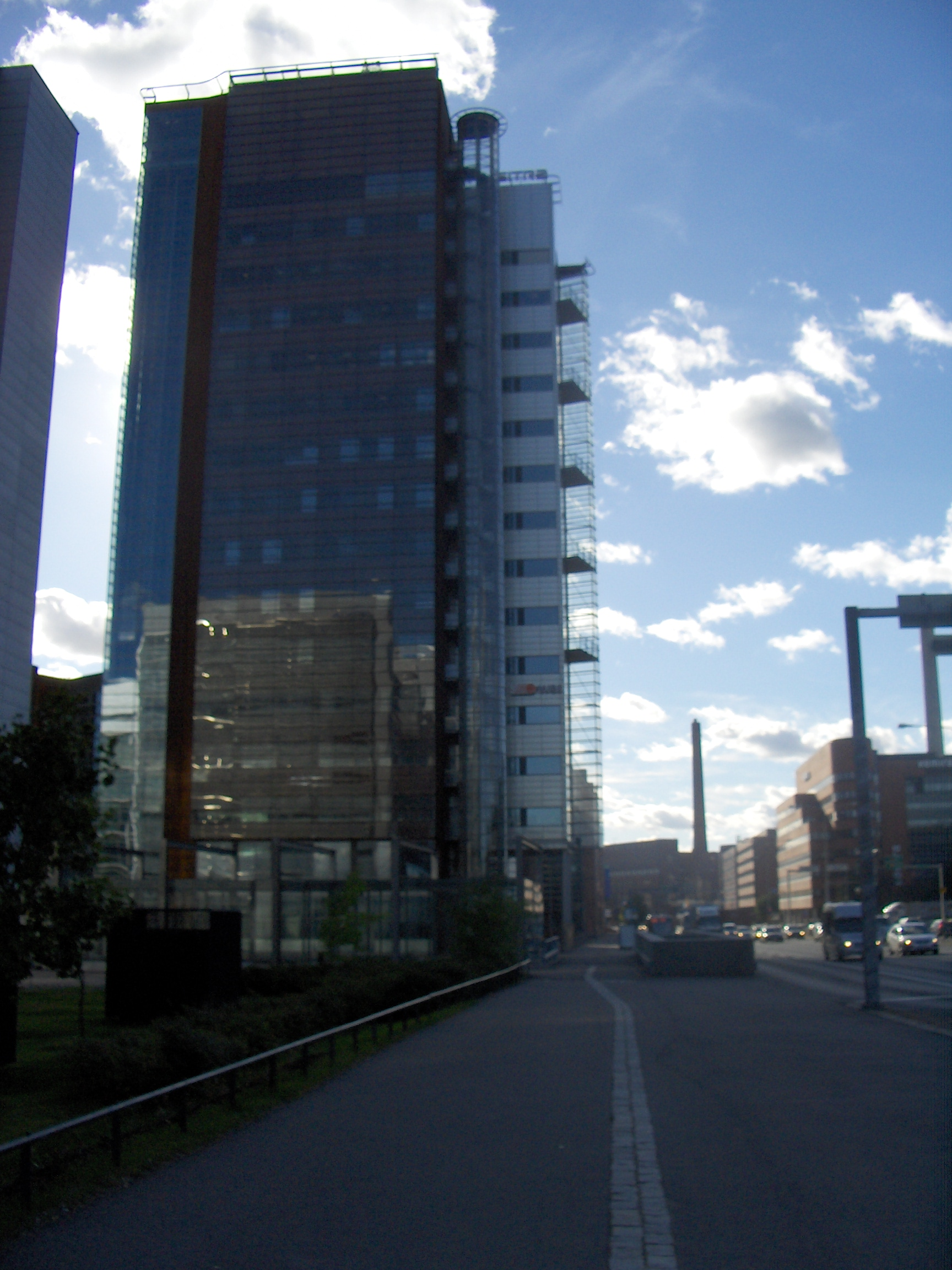
Towards Porkkalankatu street

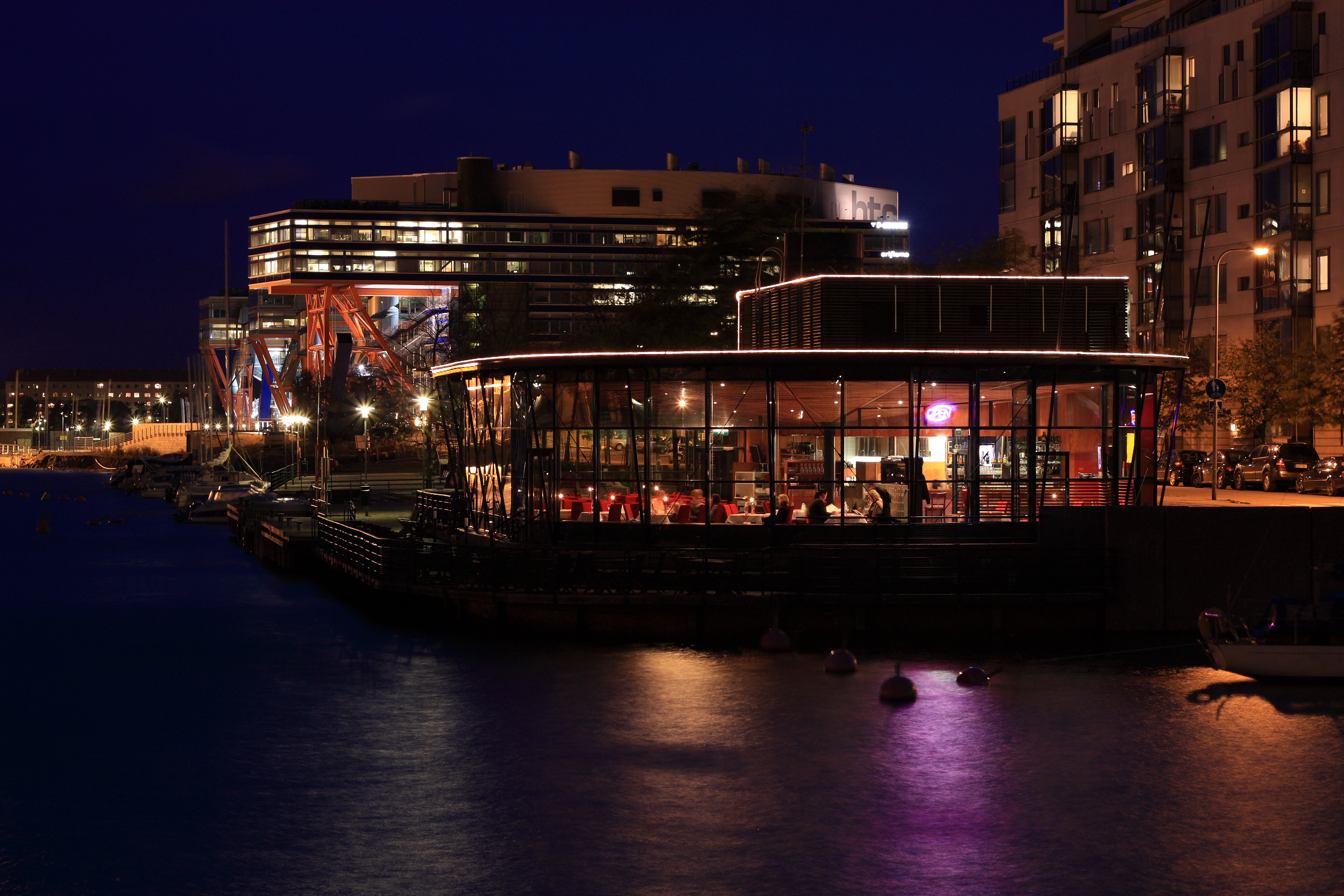
Kellosaari shoreline restaurant

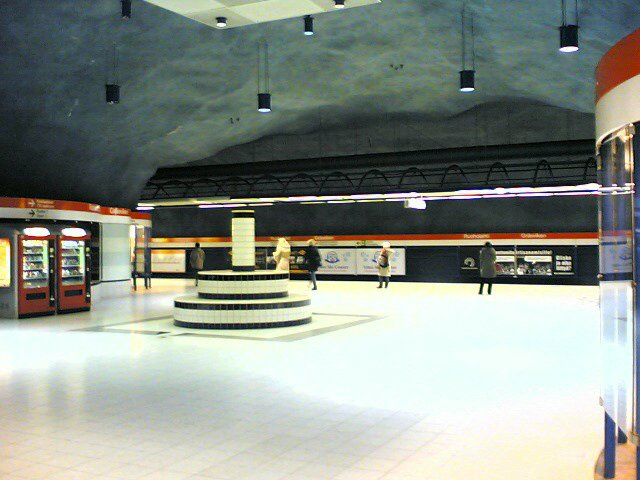
Ruoholahti Metro station

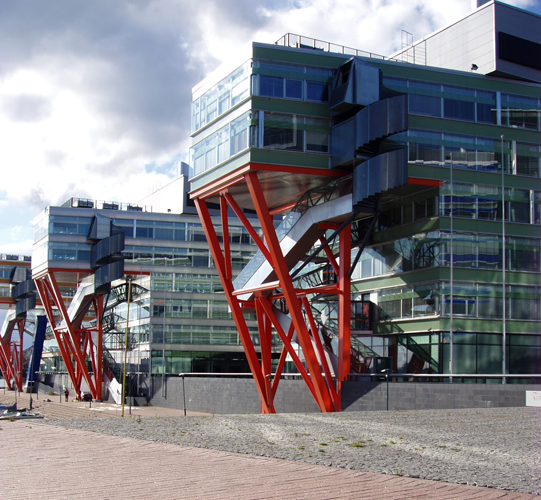
High Tech Centre, Helsinki, Kai Wartiainen (2001)

== See also ==
- Crusell Bridge
- Ruoholahti metro station
- Subdivisions of Helsinki
