= Boniérédougou =

- Town, sub-prefecture, and commune
- Location in Ivory Coast
- Coordinates: 8°23′N 4°44′W
- Country: Ivory Coast
- District: Vallée du Bandama
- Region: Hambol
- Department: Dabakala

Population (2014)
  - Total: 3,002
- Time zone: UTC+0 (GMT)

Boniérédougou is a town in northeast Ivory Coast. It is a sub-prefecture and commune of Dabakala Department in Hambol Region, Vallée du Bandama District.

In 2014, the population of the sub-prefecture of Boniérédougou was 3002 (Males:1539, Females:1463)

== Villages ==
The 25 villages of the sub-prefecture of Boniérédougou and their population in 2014 are:

1. Bakoro Séoula (374)
2. Bakoro Sobara (1 139)
3. Boniérédougou (3 002)
4. Bounadougou (1 125)
5. Broubrou Dioulasso (464)
6. Kahatadougou (147)
7. Karpélé (1 224)
8. Kayoulo (551)
9. Kokolo (335)
10. Koundodougou (1 779)
11. Loniéné (894)
12. Oualéguéra (728)
13. Palagadougou (504)
14. Souroukoudougou (937)
15. Tiékélédougou (411)
16. Tienguindougou (1 737)
17. Tossiondougou (287)
18. Yéoulesso (355)
19. Bokala Noumousso (1 205)
20. Bokala-Niampondougou (1 688)
21. Gboly Carrefour (1 006)
22. Kofila (725)
23. Pinsolodougou (1 383)
24. Sendé (639)
25. Souleymanekaha (626)
