= Lepakko =

Former social centre in helsinki

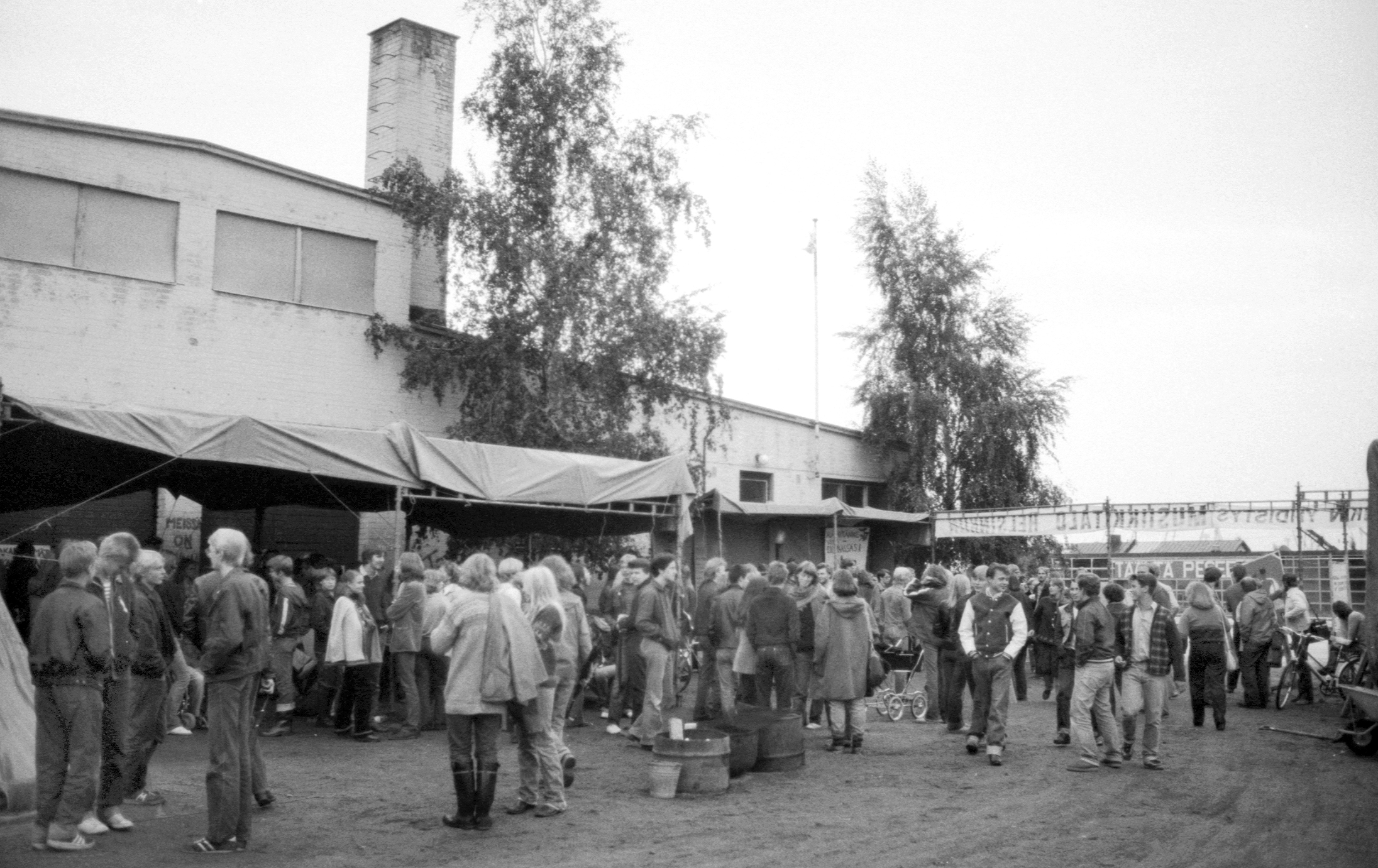
- Interactive map of Lepakko
- Coordinates: 60°9′53″N 24°54′52″E

Construction
- Built: 1940
- Opened: 1979
- Demolished: 1999

Lepakko or Lepakkoluola was a self-managed social centre and a music venue in Ruoholahti, Helsinki, Finland, functioning from 1979 to 1999.

== History ==
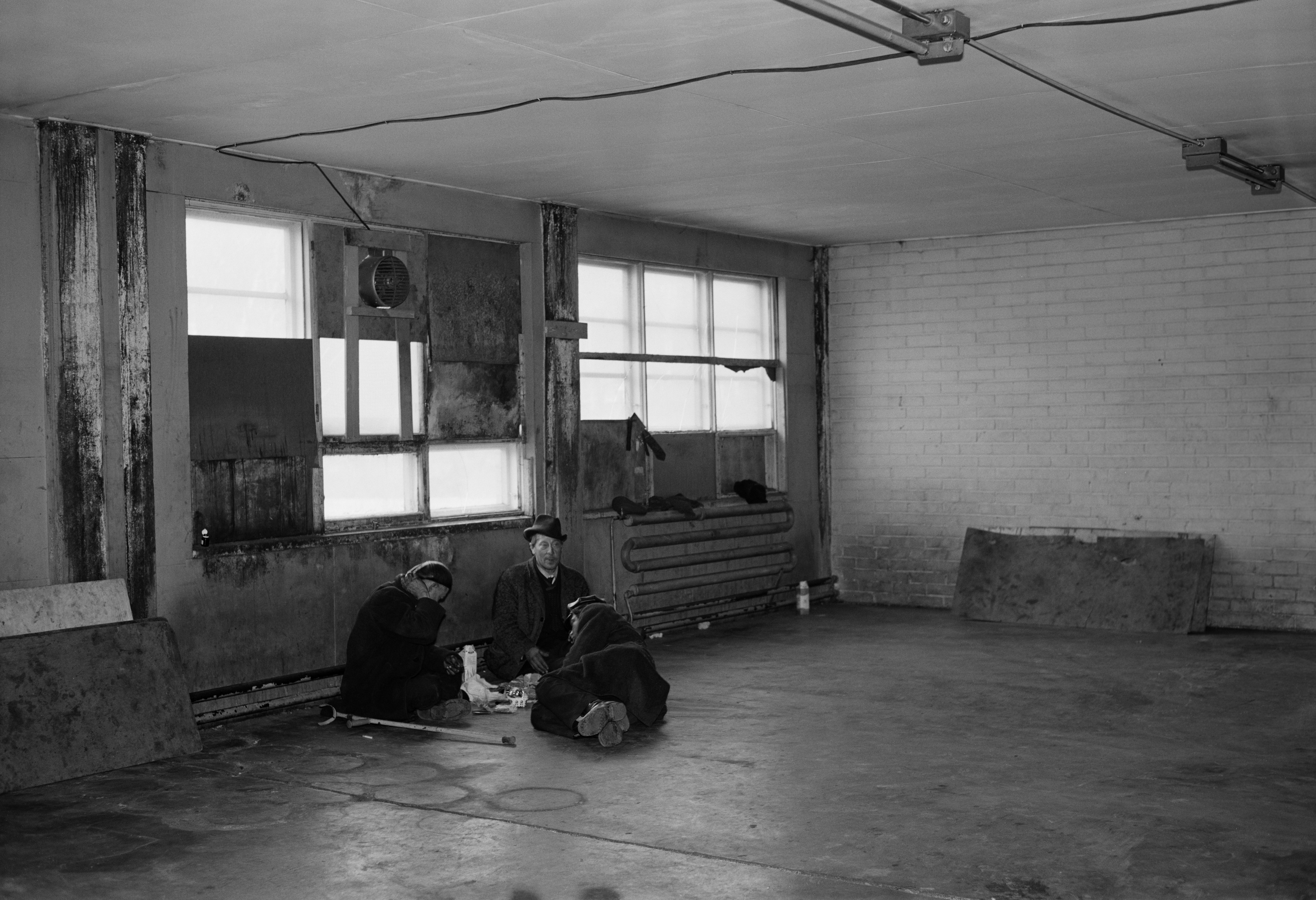
Homeless people at Liekkihotelli in 1973.

The building was a paint company warehouse located at Porkkalankatu 1 in the Ruoholahti district of Helsinki, which had been built in 1940. It then became derelict and the City Council of Helsinki opened a hostel for alcoholics on 5 December 1967, in response to public outcry when several homeless alcoholics had frozen to death in the cold of winter. It hosted up to one thousand people and was called Liekkihotelli, or the Flame Hotel.

== Occupation ==
Lepakko (Finnish for bat) was squatted in 1979 and used as a music venue, also providing practice rooms for bands, theatre rehearsal space and a dance school. In addition, a motorcycle gang had a workshop. It took its name from the logo of the paint company which still was stencilled on the walls; it had been a butterfly, but the young people saw it more as a bat. It was the first public squat in Finland and its lifetime was extended by negotiating with the city council. It was then leased for a small fee by the Elmu association. The centre became a thriving self-managed social centre during the 1980s and 1990s.

== Legacy ==
Lepakko was evicted and demolished in 1999. It had been a foundational venue for Finnish punk music and hosted Radio City, a commercial radio station.

== See also ==
- Sosiaalikeskus Satama
