= Satama-Sokoura =

- Town, sub-prefecture, and commune
- Location in Ivory Coast
- Coordinates: 7°54′N 4°22′W
- Country: Ivory Coast
- District: Vallée du Bandama
- Region: Hambol
- Department: Dabakala

Population (2014)
  - Total: 11,603
- Time zone: UTC+0 (GMT)

Satama-Sokoura is a town in northeast Ivory Coast. It is a sub-prefecture and commune of Dabakala Department in Hambol Region, Vallée du Bandama District.

In 2014, the population of the sub-prefecture of Satama-Sokoura was 11,603.

== Villages ==
The 10 villages of the sub-prefecture of Satama-Sokoura and their population in 2014 are:

1. Kétiébou (610)
2. Kongokro (249)
3. Mamidougou (567)
4. Morifidougou (621)
5. Ourognagbélé (514)
6. Satama-Sokoura (3 610)
7. Kokoumba (1 927)
8. Kouroukono Dioulasso (1 397)
9. Messarandougou (1 050)
10. Sendékou (1 058)
