= Timbé, Ivory Coast =

Timbé Tinbé
- Town and sub-prefecture
- Location in Ivory Coast
- Coordinates: 8°10′N 4°57′W
- Country: Ivory Coast
- District: Vallée du Bandama
- Region: Hambol
- Department: Katiola

Population (2014)
  - Total: 11,307
- Time zone: UTC+0 (GMT)

Timbé (also spelled Tinbé) is a town in central Ivory Coast. It is a sub-prefecture of Katiola Department in Hambol Region, Vallée du Bandama District.

Timbé was a commune until March 2012, when it became one of 1,126 communes nationwide that were abolished.

In 2014, the population of the sub-prefecture of Timbé was 11,307.

== Villages ==
The nine villages of the sub-prefecture of Timbé and their population in 2014 are:

1. Attienkaha (999)
2. Kabolo (1,354)
3. Kafigué (367)
4. Kassemé (1,634)
5. Koffissiokaha (1,716)
6. Ourougbankaha (255)
7. Timbé (2,247)
8. Toumboho (1,328)
9. Yékolo (1,407)
