= Katiola =

- Town, sub-prefecture, and commune
- Location in Ivory Coast
- Coordinates: 8°8′N 5°6′W
- Country: Ivory Coast
- District: Vallée du Bandama
- Region: Hambol
- Department: Katiola

Area
  - Total: 765 km^{2} (295 sq mi)

Population (2021 census)
  - Total: 90,641
  - Density: 118/km^{2} (307/sq mi)
  - Town: 40,319
- (2014 census)
- Time zone: UTC+0 (GMT)

Katiola is a town in central Ivory Coast. It is a sub-prefecture of and the seat of Katiola Department. It is also a commune and the seat of Hambol Region in Vallée du Bandama District.

== Transport ==
Katiola is served by a station on the national railway system and by Katiola Airport.

In 2024, the population of the sub-prefecture of Katiola was 66,681.

== Villages ==
The 11 villages of the sub-prefecture of Katiola and their population in 2024 are:

1. Foro-Foro (3 091)
2. Katiola (40 319)
3. Kationon 1 (1 135)
4. Kationon 2 (1 124)
5. Kowara (812)
6. Kpéfélé (2 041)
7. Logbonou (9 545)
8. N'dana (989)
9. Nikolo (4 394)
10. Tiédiarikaha (888)
11. Touro Gare (2 343)
