= Tembe =

Tembe may refer to:

- Tembe people (Tsonga), an ethnic group of South Africa
- Tembe (ruler) founder of the Tembe Kingdom
- Tembe (Southern African clan), Southern African clan
- Tembé, an ethnic group of Brazil
- Tembé language, a language of Brazil
- Tembe River, a river in Mozambique
- Tembe Elephant Park, a nature reserve in South Africa
- Mrs Tembe, a fictional character in the Doctors TV series
- Benjamin Mokulu Tembe (born 1989), football player
- Cristina Tembe (died 2017), Mozambican independence activist and politician
- Govindrao Tembe (1881–1955), Indian musician
- Tembe Swami (1854–1914), Indian religious leader
