= Satama-Sokoro =

- Town, sub-prefecture, and commune
- Location in Ivory Coast
- Coordinates: 7°54′N 4°32′W
- Country: Ivory Coast
- District: Vallée du Bandama
- Region: Hambol
- Department: Dabakala

Population (2014)
  - Total: 18,209
- Time zone: UTC+0 (GMT)

Satama-Sokoro is a town in northeastern Ivory Coast. It is a sub-prefecture and commune of Dabakala Department in Hambol Region, Vallée du Bandama District.

In 2014, the population of the sub-prefecture of Satama-Sokoro was 18,209.

== Villages ==
The 14 villages of the sub-prefecture of Satama-Sokoro and their population in 2014 are:

1. Djakora (480)
2. Gbamakro (736)
3. N'guessankro (694)
4. Satama Sokoro (3 293)
5. Segnene (299)
6. Balanzié (2 039)
7. Boroyaradougou (780)
8. Diaradougou (1 525)
9. Gbamélédougou (1 277)
10. Katidougou (371)
11. Kogbèra (2 992)
12. Kombara-Bambarasso (1 325)
13. Kombara-Mangrosso (1 887)
14. Lafigbogo (511)
