= Sosiaalikeskus Satama =

Former self-organised project in Helsinki, Finland

Satama
- Sosiaalikeskus Satama
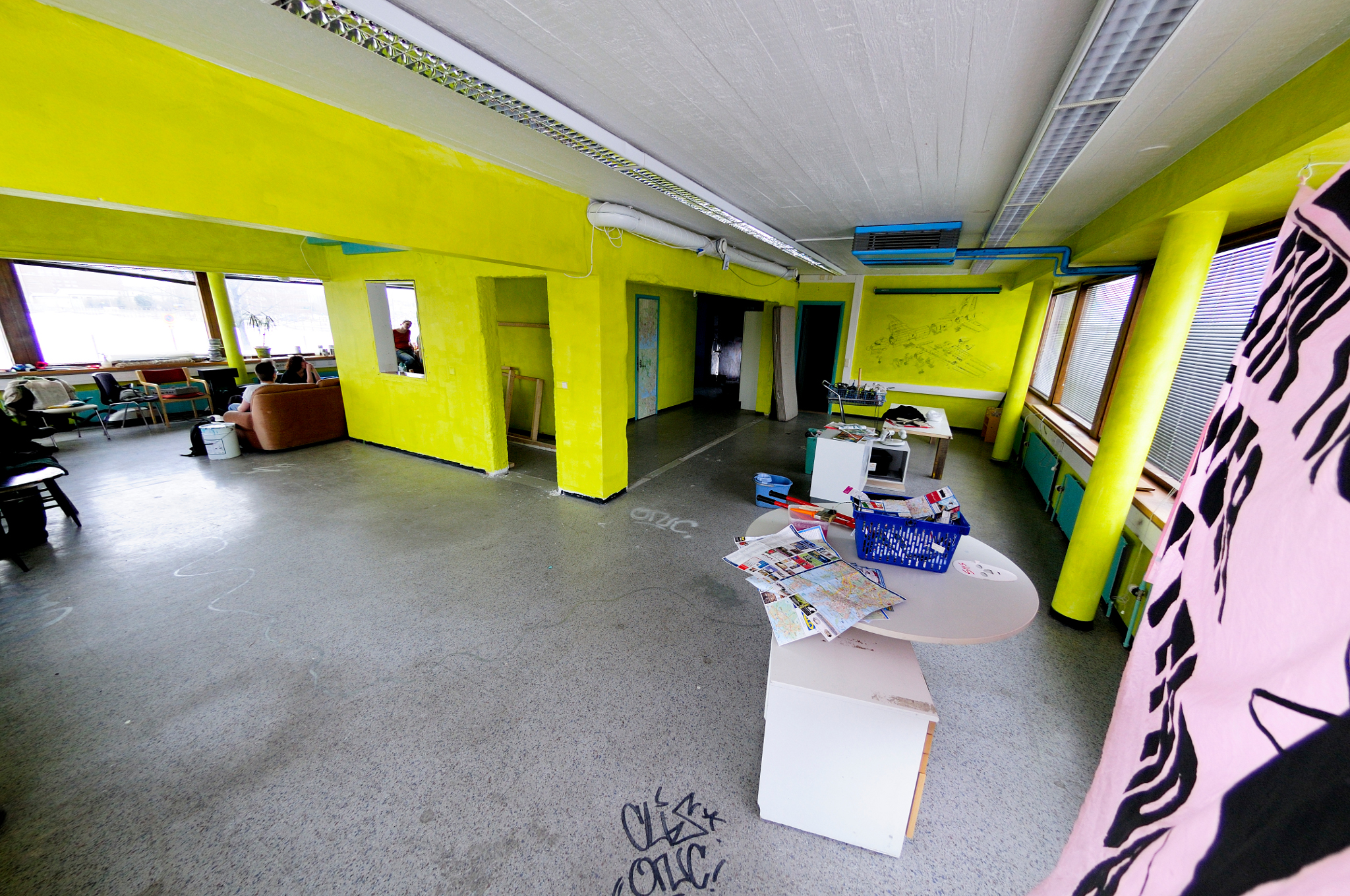
- Interactive map of Satama
- Coordinates: 60°11′36.26″N 24°58′44.90″E
- Public transit: Kalasatama metro station

Construction
- Opened: April 2009
- Closed: 2011
- Demolished: 2011

Sosiaalikeskus Satama (Harbor Social Center) was a social center in Helsinki, Finland, opened in April 2009 and evicted August 2011.

== Location ==
Satama was located 500 metres (1,600 ft) north of the Kalasatama metro station. The building stood on the Kyläsaarenkatu street, in an old customs building in the central Helsinki district of Sörnäinen, which was left empty when the harbor operations moved to the Vuosaari Harbor (hence the name satama, harbor). The building had 360 square metres (3,900 sq ft) in three stories.

The building was given to squatters by the Helsinki Board of Youth Issues in October 2008 after an exhausting series of squattings and evictions around the city. The board then paid the rent.

== Eviction ==
After long negotiations between the centre, the Mayor, the Youth Board and the Public Works Department, the city decided to evict the building.

In August 2011, the police evicted Satama, which had been in the news due to the Romani people inhabiting it. It was demolished soon thereafter to make way for new housing development.

== See also ==
- Lepakko
