= Katiola Department =

Coordinates: 8°8′N 5°6′W

Katiola Department Département de Katiola
- Department
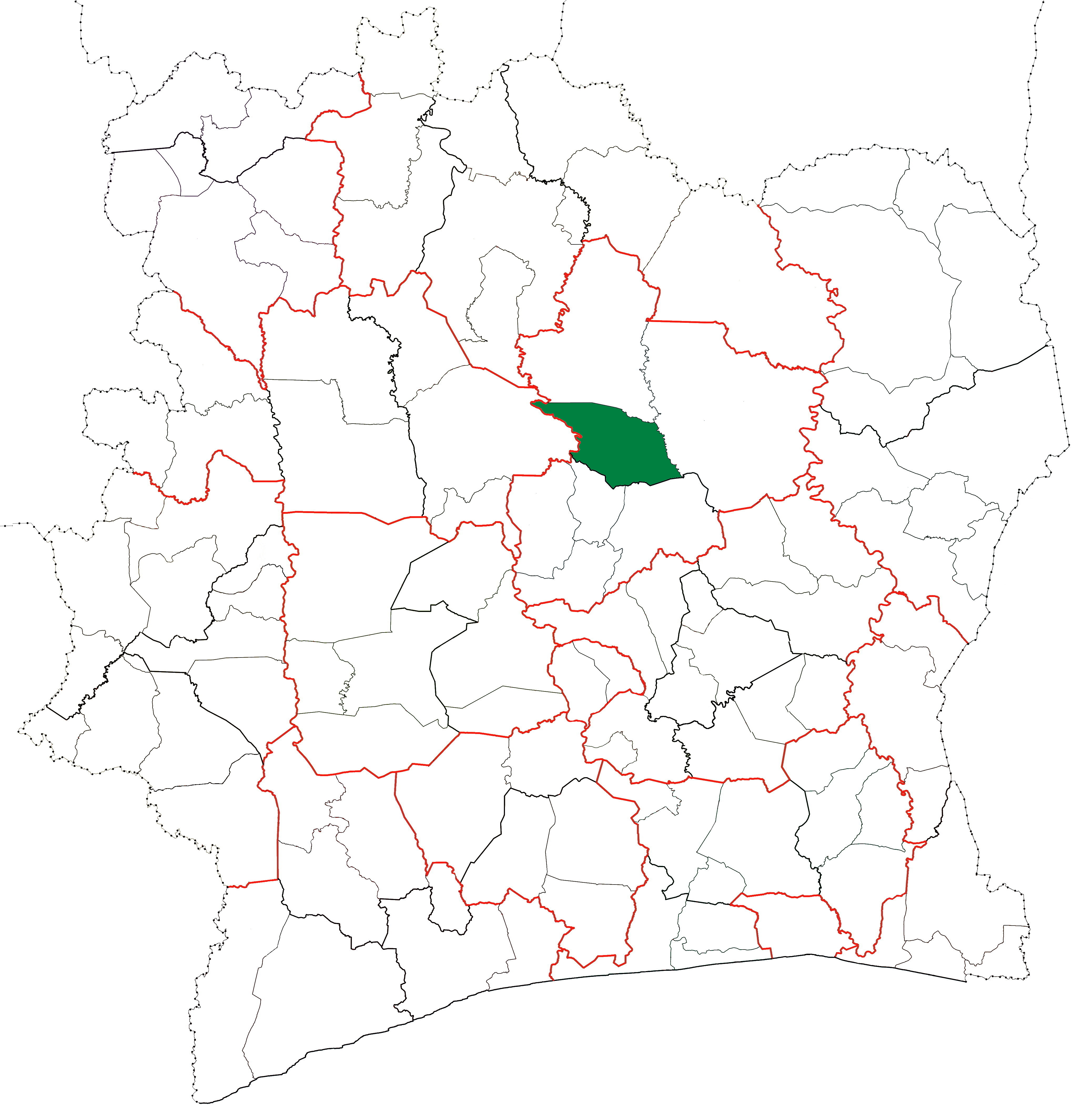
- Location in Ivory Coast. Katiola Department has had these boundaries since 2009.
- Country: Ivory Coast
- District: Vallée du Bandama
- Region: Hambol
- 1969: Established as a first-level subdivision
- 1974: Divided to create Dabakala Dept
- 1997: Converted to a second-level subdivision
- 2009: Divided to create Niakaramandougou Dept
- 2011: Converted to a third-level subdivision
- Departmental seat: Katiola

Government
  - Prefect: Yul Lambert Omepieu

Area
  - Total: 2,810 km^{2} (1,080 sq mi)

Population (2021 census)
  - Total: 162,472
  - Density: 57.8/km^{2} (150/sq mi)
- Time zone: UTC+0 (GMT)

Katiola Department is a department of Hambol Region in Vallée du Bandama District, Ivory Coast. In 2021, its population was 162,472 and its seat is the settlement of Katiola. The sub-prefectures of the department are Fronan, Katiola, and Timbé.

== History ==
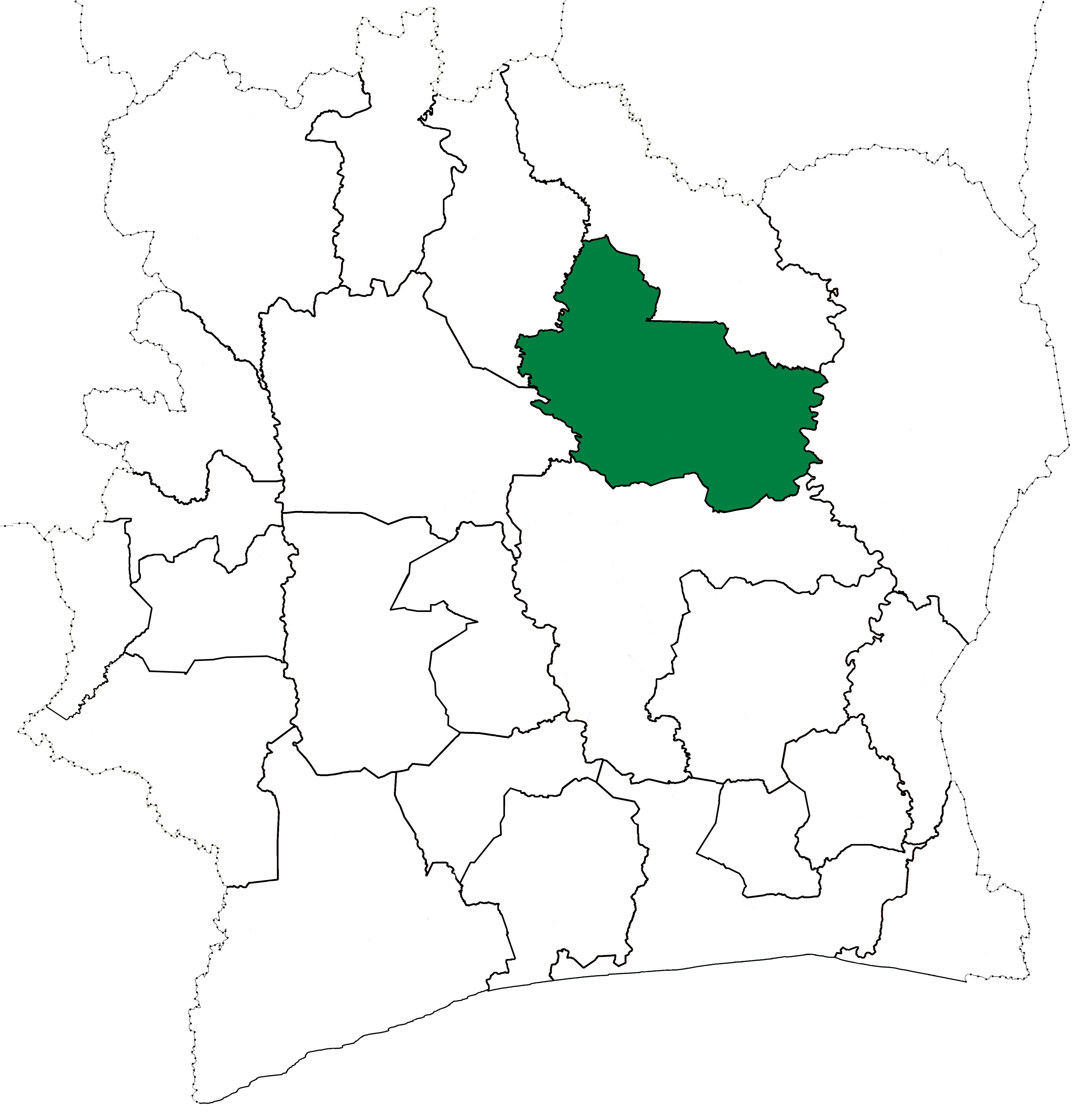
Katiola Department upon its creation in 1969. It kept these boundaries until 1974, when it became one of the first of the new departments to be divided.

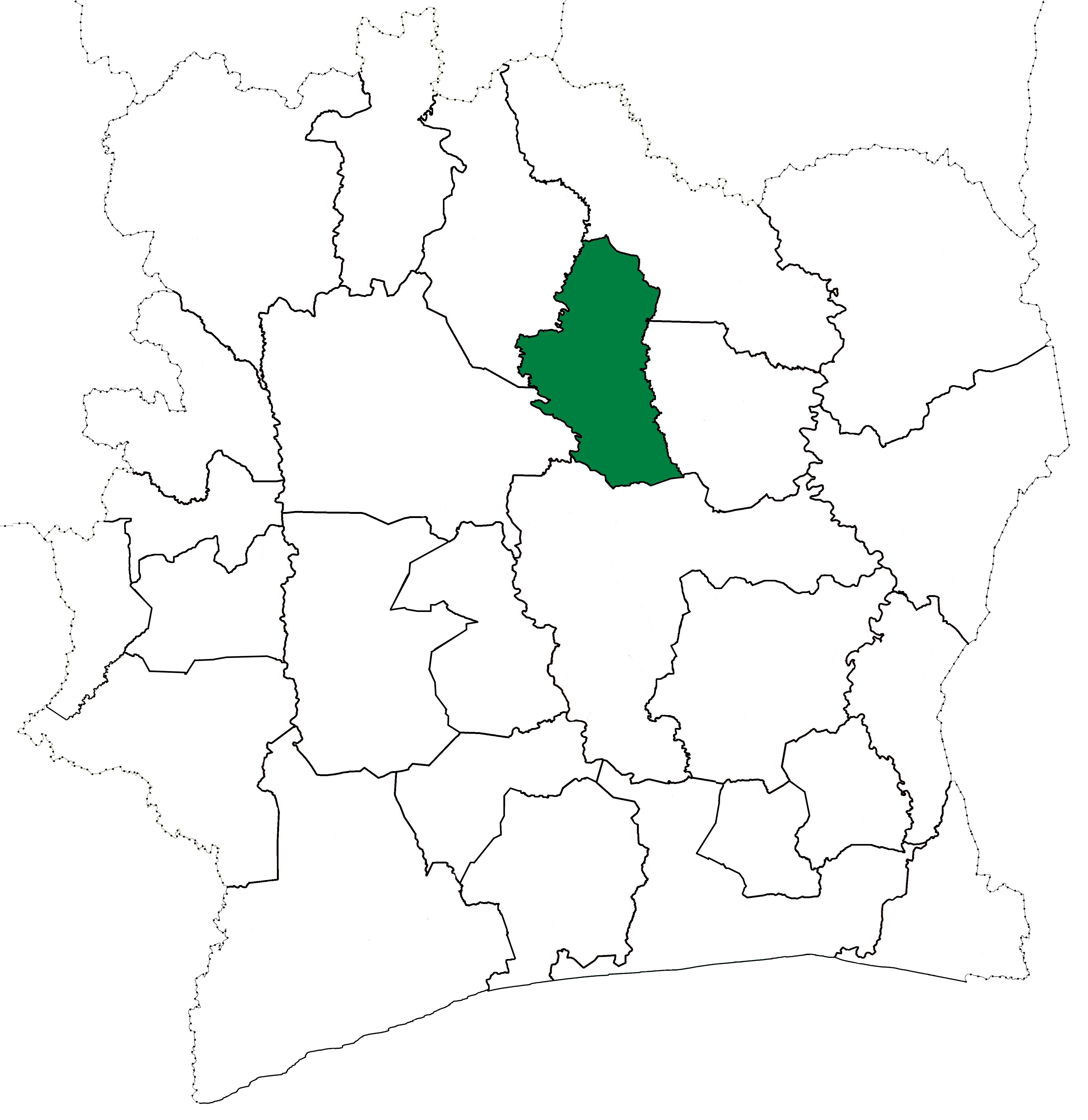
Katiola Department from 1974 to 2009. (Other subdivision boundaries began to change in 1980.)

Katiola Department was created in 1969 as one of the 24 new departments that were created to take the place of the six departments that were being abolished. It was created from territory that was formerly part of Centre Department. Using current boundaries as a reference, from 1969 to 1974 the department occupied the same territory as Hambol Region.

In 1974, Katiola Department was divided to create Dabakala Department. In 1997, regions were introduced as new first-level subdivisions of Ivory Coast; as a result, all departments were converted into second-level subdivisions. Katiola Department was included as part of Vallée du Bandama Region.

In 2009, Katiola Department was divided again to create Niakaramandougou Department.

In 2011, districts were introduced as new first-level subdivisions of Ivory Coast. At the same time, regions were reorganised and became second-level subdivisions and all departments were converted into third-level subdivisions. At this time, Katiola Department became part of Hambol Region in Vallée du Bandama District.
