= Dabakala =

- Town, sub-prefecture, and commune
- Location in Ivory Coast
- Coordinates: 8°22′N 4°26′W
- Country: Ivory Coast
- District: Vallée du Bandama
- Region: Hambol
- Department: Dabakala

Area
  - Total: 1,940 km^{2} (750 sq mi)

Population (2021 census)
  - Total: 78,634
  - Density: 40.5/km^{2} (105/sq mi)
  - Town: 14,134
- (2014 census)
- Time zone: UTC+0 (GMT)

Dabakala is a town in northeast Ivory Coast. It is a sub-prefecture of and the seat of Dabakala Department in Hambol Region, Vallée du Bandama District. Dabakala is also a commune.

Under the Wassoulou Empire, Dabakala was a major center of the arms industry, with 3-400 blacksmiths building functional copies of European repeater rifles to use in their struggle against French colonial forces.

In 2021, the population of the sub-prefecture of Dabakala was 78,634.

== Villages ==
The 25 villages of the sub-prefecture of Dabakala and their population in 2014 are:

1. Bakoro Séoula (374)
2. Bakoro Sobara (1 139)
3. Boniérédougou (3 002)
4. Bounadougou (1 125)
5. Broubrou Dioulasso (464)
6. Kahatadougou (147)
7. Karpélé (1 224)
8. Kayoulo (551)
9. Kokolo (335)
10. Koundodougou (1 779)
11. Loniéné (894)
12. Oualéguéra (728)
13. Palagadougou (504)
14. Souroukoudougou (937)
15. Tiékélédougou (411)
16. Tienguindougou (1 737)
17. Tossiondougou (287)
18. Yéoulesso (355)
19. Bokala Noumousso (1 205)
20. Bokala-Niampondougou (1 688)
21. Gboly Carrefour (1 006)
22. Kofila (725)
23. Pinsolodougou (1 383)
24. Sendé (639)
25. Souleymanekaha (626)
