= Niakaramandougou Department =

Coordinates: 8°40′N 5°17′W

Niakaramandougou Department Département de Niakaramandougou
- Department
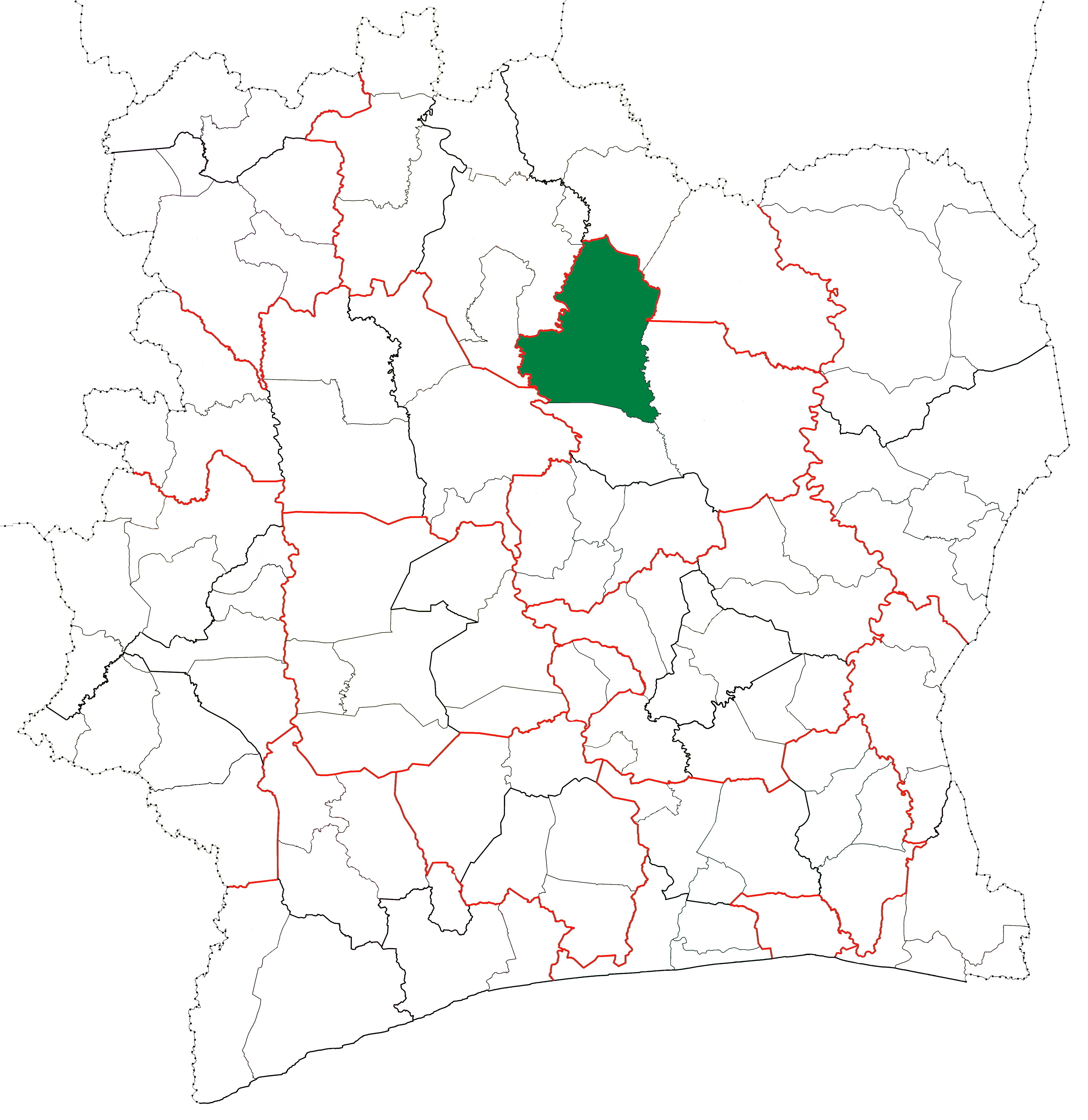
- Location in Ivory Coast. Niakaramandougou Department has retained the same boundaries since its creation in 2009.
- Country: Ivory Coast
- District: Vallée du Bandama
- Region: Hambol
- 2009: Established as a second-level subdivision via a division of Katiola Dept
- 2011: Converted to a third-level subdivision
- Departmental seat: Niakaramandougou

Government
  - Prefect: N'Guessan Ya

Area
  - Total: 6,640 km^{2} (2,560 sq mi)

Population (2021 census)
  - Total: 195,127
  - Density: 29.4/km^{2} (76.1/sq mi)
- Time zone: UTC+0 (GMT)

Niakaramandougou Department is a department of Hambol Region in Vallée du Bandama District, Ivory Coast. In 2021, its population was 195,127 and its seat is the settlement of Niakaramandougou. The sub-prefectures of the department are Arikokaha, Badikaha, Niakaramandougou, Niédiékaha, Tafiré, and Tortiya.

== History ==
Niakaramandougou Department was created in 2009 as a second-level subdivision via a split-off from Katiola Department. At its creation, it was part of Vallée du Bandama Region.

In 2011, districts were introduced as new first-level subdivisions of Ivory Coast. At the same time, regions were reorganised and became second-level subdivisions and all departments were converted into third-level subdivisions. At this time, Niakaramandougou Department became part of Hambol Region in Vallée du Bandama District.
