= Dabakala Department =

Coordinates: 8°22′N 4°26′W

Dabakala Department Département de Dabakala
- Department
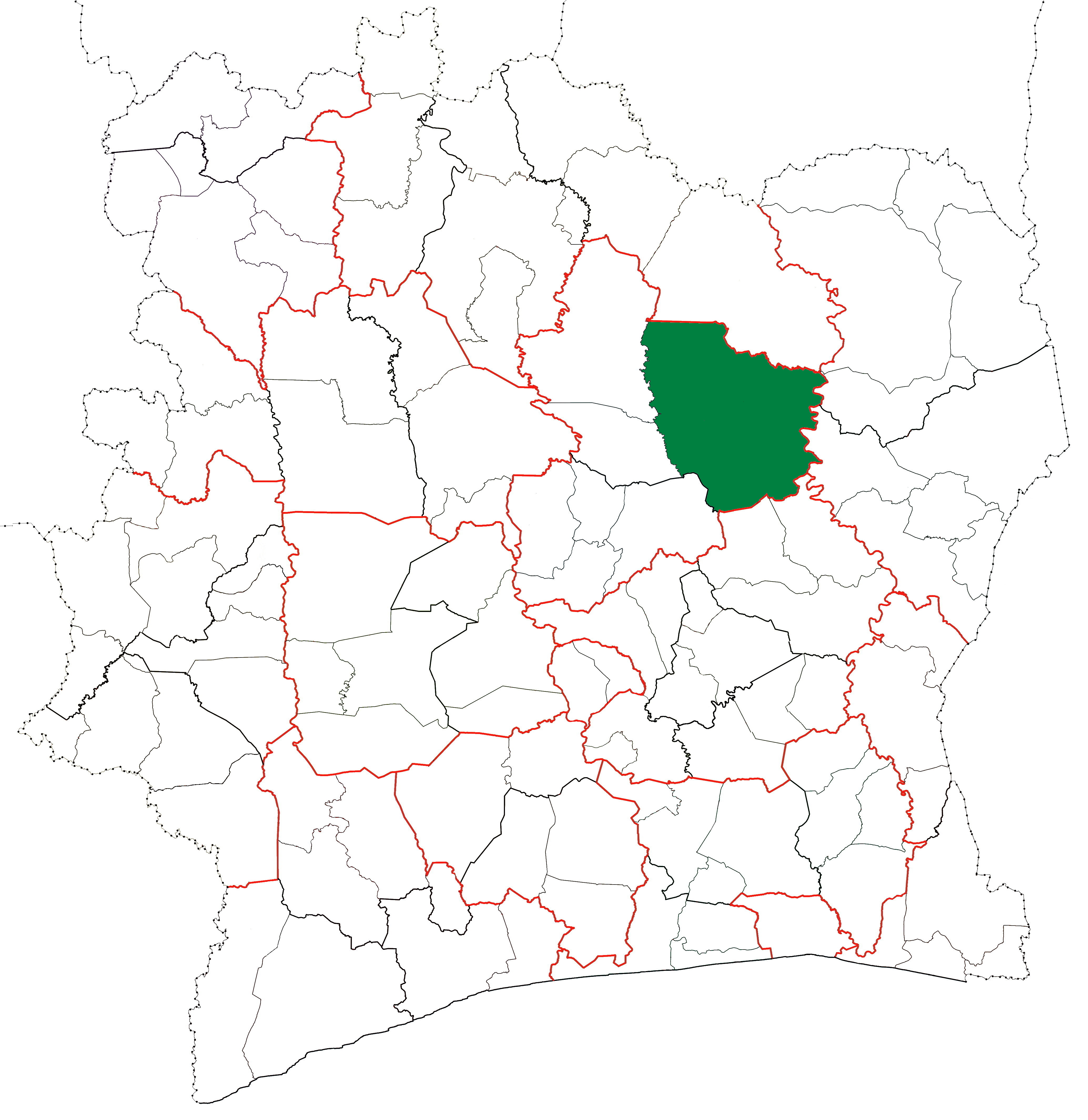
- Location in Ivory Coast. Dabakala Department has retained the same boundaries since its creation in 1974.
- Country: Ivory Coast
- District: Vallée du Bandama
- Region: Hambol
- 1974: Established as a first-level subdivision via a division of Katiola Dept
- 1997: Converted to a second-level subdivision
- 2011: Converted to a third-level subdivision
- Departmental seat: Dabakala

Government
  - Prefect: Yao Lazaré N'Dri

Area
  - Total: 9,830 km^{2} (3,800 sq mi)

Population (2021 census)
  - Total: 254,430
  - Density: 25.9/km^{2} (67.0/sq mi)
- Time zone: UTC+0 (GMT)

Dabakala Department is a department of Hambol Region in Vallée du Bandama District, Ivory Coast. In 2021, its population was 254,430 and its seat is the settlement of Dabakala. The sub-prefectures of the department are Bassawa, Boniérédougou, Dabakala, Foumbolo, Niéméné, Satama-Sokoro, Satama-Sokoura, Sokala-Sobara, Tendéné-Bambarasso, and Yaossédougou. It is the largest department of Ivory Coast by area.

== History ==
Dabakala Department was created in 1974 as a split-off from Katiola Department.

In 1997, regions were introduced as new first-level subdivisions of Ivory Coast; as a result, all departments were converted into second-level subdivisions. Dabakala Department was included in Vallée du Bandama Region.

In 2011, districts were introduced as new first-level subdivisions of Ivory Coast. At the same time, regions were reorganised and became second-level subdivisions and all departments were converted into third-level subdivisions. At this time, Dabakala Department became part of Hambol Region in Vallée du Bandama District.
