= Vallée du Bandama District =

District of Ivory Coast

Coordinates: 8°8′N 5°6′W

Vallée du Bandama District District de la Vallée du Bandama
- District
- Country: Ivory Coast
- Established: 2011
- Capital: Bouaké

Area
  - Total: 28,518 km^{2} (11,011 sq mi)

Population (2021)
  - Total: 1,964,929
  - Density: 68.901/km^{2} (178.45/sq mi)
- ISO 3166 code: CI-VB
- HDI (2022): 0.554 medium · 5th of 14

Vallée du Bandama District (French: District de la Vallée du Bandama, [va.le dy bɑ̃.da.ma], "Bandama Valley") is one of fourteen administrative districts of Ivory Coast. The district is located in the north-central part of the country. The capital of the district is Bouaké.

== Creation ==
Vallée du Bandama District was created in a 2011 administrative reorganisation of the subdivisions of Ivory Coast. The territory of the district was composed of the former Vallée du Bandama Region.

== Location ==
The district is located in the north-central part of the country, it borders from north, going clockwise Savanes District, Zanzan District,

Lacs District, Sassandra-Marahoué District, Woroba District

== Administrative divisions ==
Vallée du Bandama District is currently subdivided into two regions and the following departments:

- Gbêkê Region (region seat also in Bouaké)
  - Béoumi Department
  - Botro Department
  - Bouaké Department
  - Sakassou Department
- Hambol Region (region seat in Katiola)
  - Dabakala Department
  - Katiola Department
  - Niakaramandougou Department

== Population ==
According to the 2021 census, Vallée du Bandama District has a population of 1,964,929.

=== Religion ===
Religion in Vallée du Bandama (2021 census)
Religion	Percent
Islam	44.0%
Christianity	33.8%
None	16.0%
Traditional	2.7%
Other	3.5%

Vallée du Bandama has a religiously diverse population. According to the 2021 census, Islam is the plurality religion in the district (44.0%), followed by Christianity (33.8%) and those with no religion (16.0%). A smaller share of residents adhere to traditional religions or other faiths.
