= Hambol =

Coordinates: 7°41′N 5°1′W

Hambol Region Région du Hambol
- Region
- Seal
- Motto: "S'unir pour le développement"
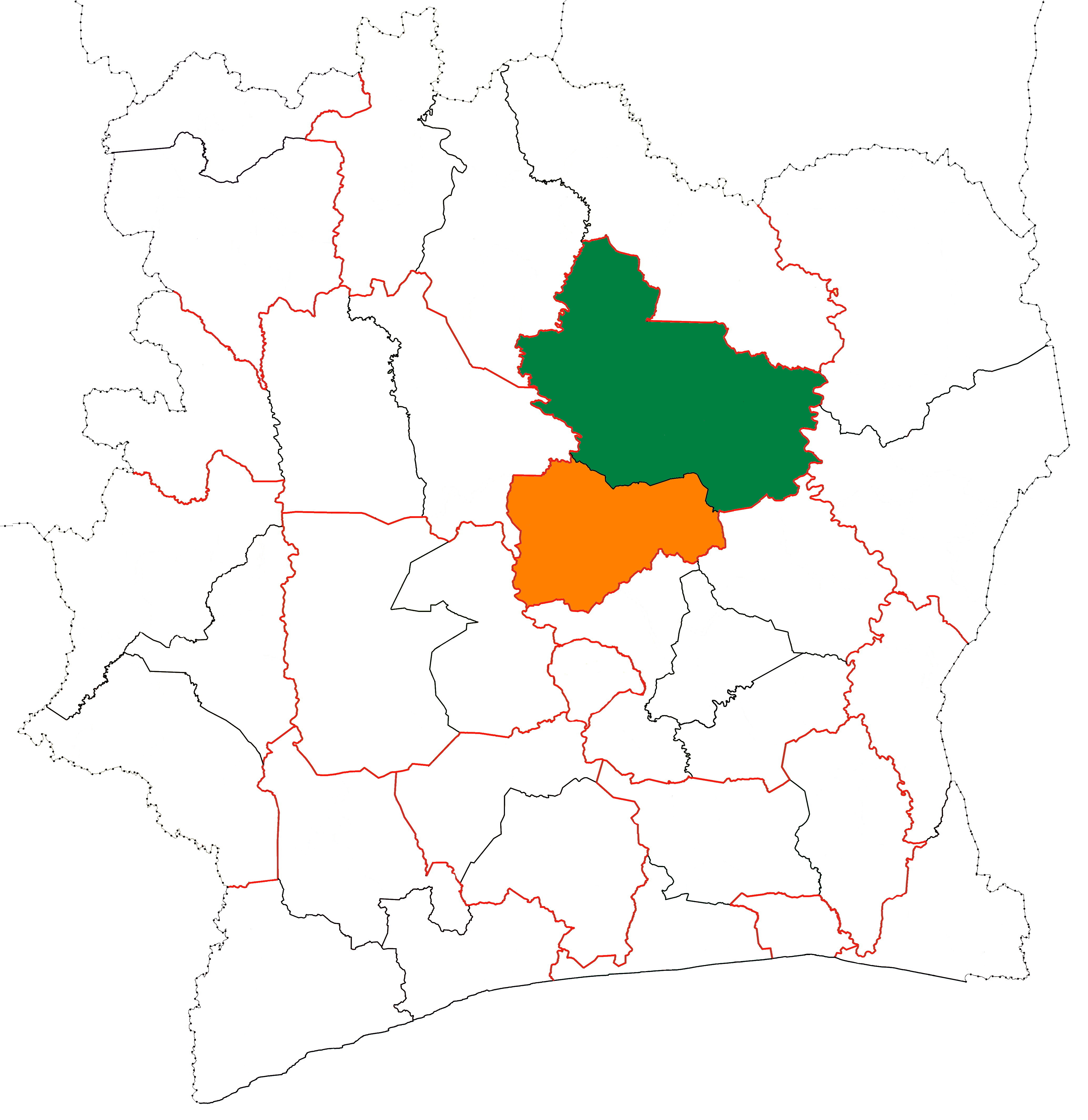
- Location of Hambol Region (green) in Ivory Coast and in Vallée du Bandama District
- Country: Ivory Coast
- District: Vallée du Bandama
- Established: 2011
- Regional seat: Katiola

Government
  - Prefect: Yul Lambert Omepieu
  - Council President: Brahima Traoré

Area
  - Total: 19,280 km^{2} (7,440 sq mi)

Population (2021 census)
  - Total: 612,029
  - Density: 31.74/km^{2} (82.22/sq mi)
- Time zone: UTC+0 (GMT)

Hambol Region is one of the 31 regions of Ivory Coast. Since its establishment in 2011, it has been one of two regions in Vallée du Bandama District. The seat of the region is Katiola and the region's population in the 2021 census was 612,029.

Hambol is currently divided into three departments: Dabakala, Katiola, and Niakaramandougou.
