= Bougouni Region =

Bougouni
- Region
- Coordinates: 11.416667°N 7.483333°W
- Country: Mali
- Capital: Bougouni

Area
  - Total: 36,670 km^{2} (14,160 sq mi)

Population (2023)
  - Total: 1,549,567

Bougouni Region is an administrative region in southern Mali. It was formed from parts of the former Sikasso Region and smaller areas of Koulikoro Region. Its capital is the city of Bougouni. The region borders Guinea and Ivory Coast to the south and is one of the agriculturally important areas of the country.

== Geography ==
Bougouni Region is located in southern Mali, between the Greater Bamako area, Sikasso Region and the southern neighbouring states of Guinea and Ivory Coast. It covers an area of 36,670 km². The region lies largely within the Sahel-Sudanic climate zone and receives more rainfall than the more northerly parts of Mali. The landscape is characterised by savannas, agricultural land and river valleys. Parts of the region lie in the drainage basin of the Niger River, particularly in the area of the Sankarani River, where the Sélingué reservoir is located.

== History ==
The area of present-day Bougouni Region long belonged largely to Sikasso Region after Mali’s independence. The creation of a separate Bougouni Region had already been envisaged by the administrative reform of 2012, but was initially only partly implemented. Law No. 2023-006 of 13 March 2023 on the creation of administrative districts in the Republic of Mali confirmed the new administrative structure and established Bougouni as one of the country’s regions.

== Administrative divisions ==
The region is divided into ten cercles. According to OCHA, it comprises 30 arrondissements, 57 communes and 1,010 villages.

Cercle code	Cercle	Communes
1501	Bougouni	13
1502	Yanfolila	9
1503	Kolondiéba	6
1504	Garalo	6
1505	Koumantou	5
1506	Sélingué	7
1507	Ouélessébougou	3
1508	Kadiala	3
1509	Fakola	3
1510	Dogo	2

== Demographics ==
In 2023, the region had a population of 1,549,567. The population is ethnically and linguistically diverse. The main population groups include the Bambara, Malinke, Peul/Fulbe, Soninke and other groups of southern Mali. Owing to its relatively favourable natural conditions, the region has a higher population density than the northern parts of the country. Religiously, the region is 98.89% Muslim, with a Christian minority of 0.93%.

Year	Population
1998	692,485
2009	977,054
2022	1,549,567

Ethnicity in Bougouni region (2022)
1. Bambara (64.5%)
2. Fula (21.3%)
3. Malinké (5.49%)
4. Senufo (3.09%)
5. Dogon (1.86%)
6. Bozo (1.05%)
7. Other (2.70%)
Mother tongues in Bougouni region (2022 census)
1. Bambara (82.78%)
2. Fula (6.35%)
3. Malinke (4.93%)
4. Dogon (1.72%)
5. Minianka (1.23%)
6. Bozo (0.91%)
7. Other Malian (1.97%)
8. Other African (0.02%)
9. Other foreign (0.09%)
10. Other (0.00%)

== Economy ==
The economy of Bougouni Region is mainly based on agriculture. Rain-fed farming, livestock raising, small-scale market gardening and regional trade are important. Crops grown include cereals, cotton, maize, peanuts and other field crops. Because of its location in southern Mali, the region has more favourable rainfall conditions than the Sahelian areas of the country, but remains dependent on climatic fluctuations and irregular rainy seasons.

Mining has also become increasingly important. The Goulamina lithium project is located in the region and is being developed under an agreement between Mali and the Chinese company Ganfeng Lithium. According to the Malian government and Reuters, Mali’s stake in the project was to be increased to 35%; a spodumene plant was also announced. The Goulamina mine was officially opened in December 2024 and is regarded as one of the most important lithium projects in West Africa. Another lithium project near Bougouni is operated by Les Mines de Lithium de Bougouni SA; it is located about 180 km south of Bamako and began producing spodumene concentrate in 2025.
