= Geography of Mali =

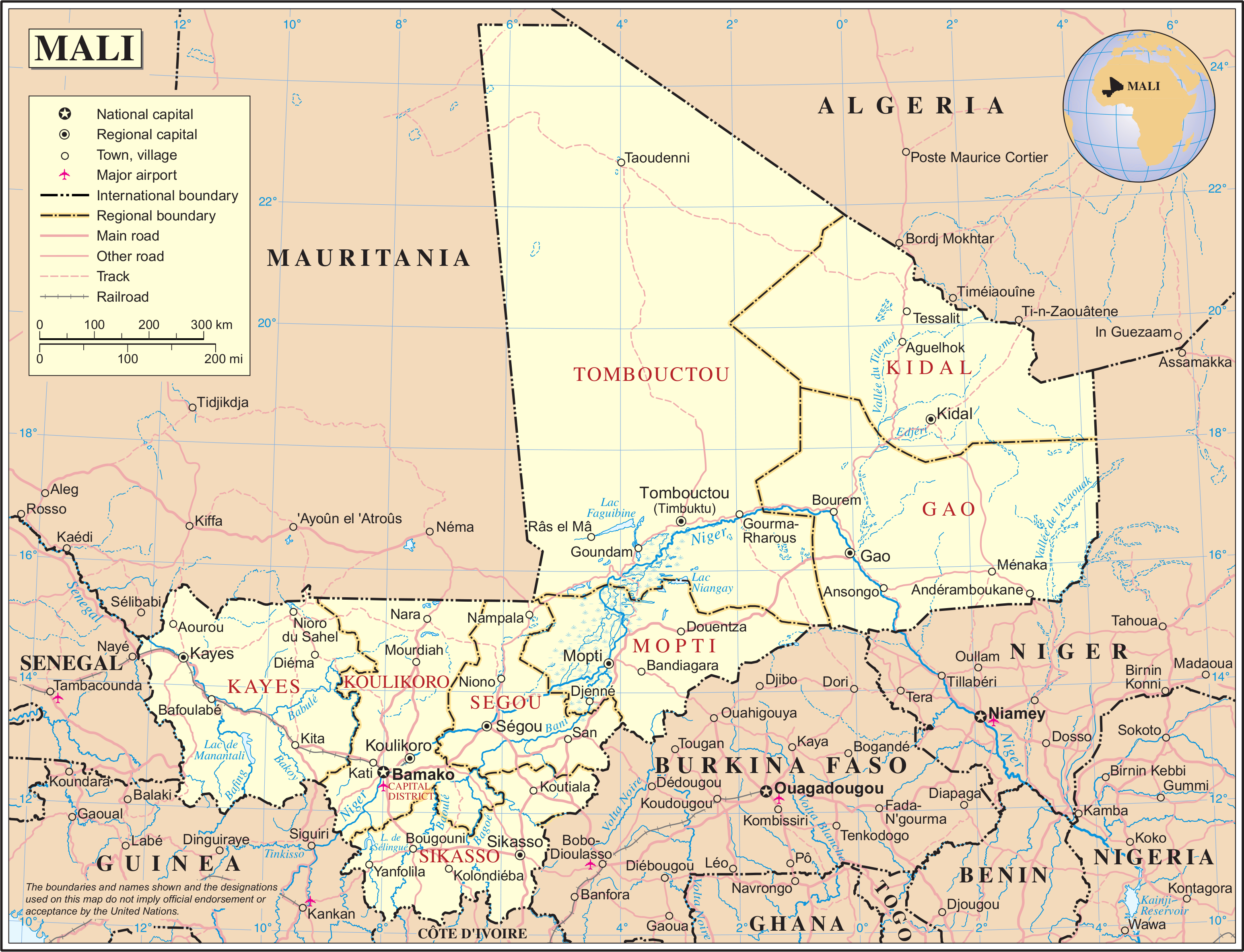
A map of Mali

Location of Mali

Mali is a landlocked nation in West Africa, located southwest of Algeria, extending south-west from the southern Sahara Desert through the Sahel to the Sudanian savanna zone. Mali's size is 1,240,192 square kilometers.

Desert or semi-desert covers about 65 percent of Mali's total area (1,240,192 square kilometers). The Niger River creates a large and fertile inland delta as it arcs northeast through Mali from Guinea before turning south and eventually emptying into the Gulf of Guinea.

The territory encompasses three natural zones: the southern cultivated Sudanese zone, central semi-desert Sahelian zone, and northern desert Saharan zone. The terrain is primarily savanna in the south and flat to rolling plains or high plateau (200–500 meters in elevation) in the north. There are rugged hills in the northeast, with elevations of up to 1,000 meters.

The Niger (with 1,693 kilometers in Mali) and Senegal are Mali's two largest rivers. The Niger is generally described as Mali's lifeblood, a source of food, drinking water, irrigation, and transportation.

The country's lowest point is on the Senegal River (23 m) and its highest point is Hombori Tondo (1155 m).

== Climate ==
Köppen climate classification map of Mali

Mali is one of the hottest countries in the world, and has overall a hot, sunny and dry climate dominated by the subtropical ridge. The thermal equator, which matches the hottest spots year-round on the planet based on the mean daily annual temperature, crosses the country. Most of Mali receives negligible rainfall and droughts are very frequent. Late April to early October is the rainy season in the southernmost area. During this time, flooding of the Niger River is common, creating the Inner Niger Delta. The vast northern desert part of Mali has a hot desert climate (Köppen BWh) with long, extremely hot summers and scarce rainfall which decreases northwards. The central area has a hot semi-arid climate (Köppen BSh) with very high temperatures year-round, a long, intense dry season and a brief, irregular rainy season. The southern areas have a tropical savanna climate (Köppen Aw) featuring very high temperatures year-round with a dry season and a rainy season. During the hottest season of the year, temperatures are high throughout the country. Timbuktu, Taghaza, Taoudenni, Araouane, Gao, Kidal and Tessalit are some of the hottest spots on Earth during their warmest months. Kayes, with an average high temperature of about 44 °C or 111.2 °F in April is nicknamed "the pressure cooker of Africa" due to the extreme heat year-round. The heat is more extreme to the north in the Sahara Desert; the maximum average high temperature of the year reaches 46 °C or 114.8 °F in Araouane in June and comes close to 48 °C or 118.4 °F in the Taoudenni region during July. Sunshine duration is high in Mali, reaching the highest levels in the northern arid zone with about 3,600 – 3,700 h a year.

=== Examples ===
Climate data for Bamako (1950–2000, extremes 1949–2015)
Month	Jan	Feb	Mar	Apr	May	Jun	Jul	Aug	Sep	Oct	Nov	Dec	Year
Record high °C (°F)	38.9 (102.0)	42.8 (109.0)	43.9 (111.0)	43.5 (110.3)	45.0 (113.0)	42.0 (107.6)	40.0 (104.0)	37.8 (100.0)	38.4 (101.1)	38.9 (102.0)	42.0 (107.6)	40.0 (104.0)	45.0 (113.0)
Mean daily maximum °C (°F)	33.4 (92.1)	36.4 (97.5)	38.5 (101.3)	39.6 (103.3)	38.5 (101.3)	35.3 (95.5)	32.1 (89.8)	31.1 (88.0)	32.2 (90.0)	34.6 (94.3)	35.3 (95.5)	33.4 (92.1)	35.0 (95.0)
Mean daily minimum °C (°F)	17.0 (62.6)	19.9 (67.8)	22.9 (73.2)	25.2 (77.4)	25.4 (77.7)	23.6 (74.5)	22.2 (72.0)	21.8 (71.2)	21.6 (70.9)	21.3 (70.3)	18.4 (65.1)	16.8 (62.2)	21.3 (70.3)
Record low °C (°F)	8.7 (47.7)	9.0 (48.2)	12.0 (53.6)	15.8 (60.4)	17.8 (64.0)	16.1 (61.0)	17.5 (63.5)	17.2 (63.0)	18.0 (64.4)	14.7 (58.5)	10.8 (51.4)	6.0 (42.8)	6.0 (42.8)
Average rainfall mm (inches)	0.6 (0.02)	0.7 (0.03)	2.1 (0.08)	19.7 (0.78)	54.1 (2.13)	132.1 (5.20)	224.1 (8.82)	290.2 (11.43)	195.9 (7.71)	66.1 (2.60)	5.2 (0.20)	0.5 (0.02)	991.3 (39.03)
Average rainy days (≥ 0.1 mm)	0.2	0.2	0.6	3.3	6.3	7.7	16.7	17.9	14.7	5.7	0.3	0.1	73.7
Average relative humidity (%)	24	20	22	33	50	67	77	81	78	65	38	27	49
Mean monthly sunshine hours	277.4	253.0	268.1	230.4	242.6	233.6	216.6	218.3	221.7	253.7	270.7	268.6	2,954.7
Source 1: World Meteorological Organization
Source 2: NOAA (sun 1961–1990), Deutscher Wetterdienst (extremes and humidity)

Climate data for Sikasso, Mali (1950-2000, extremes 1940-1994)
Month	Jan	Feb	Mar	Apr	May	Jun	Jul	Aug	Sep	Oct	Nov	Dec	Year
Record high °C (°F)	40.5 (104.9)	41.2 (106.2)	42.1 (107.8)	42.0 (107.6)	44.0 (111.2)	39.2 (102.6)	42.2 (108.0)	36.7 (98.1)	38.9 (102.0)	38.9 (102.0)	40.0 (104.0)	39.2 (102.6)	44.0 (111.2)
Mean daily maximum °C (°F)	33.5 (92.3)	36.0 (96.8)	37.4 (99.3)	37.3 (99.1)	35.6 (96.1)	32.9 (91.2)	30.7 (87.3)	29.9 (85.8)	31.0 (87.8)	33.3 (91.9)	34.4 (93.9)	33.1 (91.6)	33.8 (92.8)
Mean daily minimum °C (°F)	15.3 (59.5)	18.3 (64.9)	22.1 (71.8)	24.6 (76.3)	24.1 (75.4)	22.4 (72.3)	21.5 (70.7)	21.4 (70.5)	21.3 (70.3)	21.5 (70.7)	18.5 (65.3)	15.2 (59.4)	20.5 (68.9)
Record low °C (°F)	8.2 (46.8)	10.0 (50.0)	13.0 (55.4)	16.8 (62.2)	17.1 (62.8)	17.7 (63.9)	17.2 (63.0)	17.0 (62.6)	18.0 (64.4)	14.0 (57.2)	10.0 (50.0)	8.0 (46.4)	8.0 (46.4)
Average rainfall mm (inches)	1.4 (0.06)	4.1 (0.16)	12.8 (0.50)	45.9 (1.81)	109.1 (4.30)	152.3 (6.00)	243.7 (9.59)	308.8 (12.16)	210.0 (8.27)	84.4 (3.32)	11.7 (0.46)	2.0 (0.08)	1,186.2 (46.71)
Average rainy days (≥ 0.1 mm)	0.2	0.6	2.3	5.4	9.9	12.7	17.0	20.0	14.5	9.0	1.4	0.2	93.2
Average relative humidity (%)	31	27	33	48	61	72	79	82	80	71	52	38	56
Mean monthly sunshine hours	263.1	242.3	237.6	217.5	242.0	220.8	203.2	176.6	190.7	243.0	257.6	261.6	2,756
Source 1: World Meteorological Organization
Source 2: NOAA (sun 1961–1990), Deutscher Wetterdienst (extremes and humidity)

Climate data for Kayes (1950-2000)
Month	Jan	Feb	Mar	Apr	May	Jun	Jul	Aug	Sep	Oct	Nov	Dec	Year
Mean daily maximum °C (°F)	33.6 (92.5)	36.6 (97.9)	39.4 (102.9)	41.7 (107.1)	41.9 (107.4)	38.2 (100.8)	33.6 (92.5)	32.0 (89.6)	33.1 (91.6)	36.1 (97.0)	36.7 (98.1)	33.5 (92.3)	36.4 (97.5)
Mean daily minimum °C (°F)	16.9 (62.4)	19.3 (66.7)	22.2 (72.0)	25.5 (77.9)	28.4 (83.1)	26.6 (79.9)	24.2 (75.6)	23.3 (73.9)	23.2 (73.8)	23.0 (73.4)	20.0 (68.0)	17.2 (63.0)	22.5 (72.5)
Average rainfall mm (inches)	0.0 (0.0)	0.4 (0.02)	0.1 (0.00)	0.6 (0.02)	12.0 (0.47)	82.6 (3.25)	155.2 (6.11)	215.9 (8.50)	140.9 (5.55)	41.2 (1.62)	2.7 (0.11)	1.1 (0.04)	652.7 (25.69)
Average rainy days (≥ 0.1 mm)	0.0	0.0	0.1	0.1	2.8	7.8	12.3	14.8	11.4	4.0	0.1	0.0	53.4
Mean monthly sunshine hours	263.5	250.0	282.1	285.0	279.0	215.0	211.8	223.2	240.0	263.5	264.0	260.6	3,037.7
Source 1: World Meteorological Organization
Source 2: NOAA (sun 1961–1990)

Climate data for Mopti (1950-2000, extremes 1935-1994)
Month	Jan	Feb	Mar	Apr	May	Jun	Jul	Aug	Sep	Oct	Nov	Dec	Year
Record high °C (°F)	39.2 (102.6)	44.0 (111.2)	44.6 (112.3)	45.5 (113.9)	48.3 (118.9)	46.7 (116.1)	43.2 (109.8)	43.3 (109.9)	42.8 (109.0)	44.4 (111.9)	44.5 (112.1)	39.3 (102.7)	48.3 (118.9)
Mean daily maximum °C (°F)	31.7 (89.1)	34.9 (94.8)	37.7 (99.9)	40.2 (104.4)	40.5 (104.9)	38.3 (100.9)	34.6 (94.3)	32.6 (90.7)	33.3 (91.9)	35.5 (95.9)	35.0 (95.0)	31.6 (88.9)	35.5 (95.9)
Mean daily minimum °C (°F)	15.1 (59.2)	17.6 (63.7)	21.2 (70.2)	24.7 (76.5)	26.5 (79.7)	25.7 (78.3)	23.9 (75.0)	23.3 (73.9)	23.7 (74.7)	23.4 (74.1)	19.5 (67.1)	16.0 (60.8)	21.7 (71.1)
Record low °C (°F)	6.1 (43.0)	7.2 (45.0)	10.0 (50.0)	13.4 (56.1)	15.8 (60.4)	18.3 (64.9)	17.4 (63.3)	18.0 (64.4)	15.0 (59.0)	14.4 (57.9)	11.9 (53.4)	7.0 (44.6)	6.1 (43.0)
Average rainfall mm (inches)	0.8 (0.03)	0.0 (0.0)	0.8 (0.03)	4.0 (0.16)	23.4 (0.92)	55.8 (2.20)	140.5 (5.53)	165.6 (6.52)	88.7 (3.49)	19.8 (0.78)	0.3 (0.01)	0.4 (0.02)	500.1 (19.69)
Average rainy days (≥ 0.1 mm)	0.1	0.1	0.4	1.1	3.4	7.5	12.3	14.0	8.6	3.0	0.1	0.1	50.7
Average relative humidity (%)	24	20	19	21	33	47	62	70	66	49	31	27	39
Mean monthly sunshine hours	272.6	270.0	274.2	254.6	269.2	242.3	244.3	246.2	249.8	278.5	282.0	264.3	3,148
Source 1: World Meteorological Organization
Source 2: NOAA (sun 1961-1990), Deutscher Wetterdienst (extremes and humidity)

Climate data for Timbuktu (1950–2000, extremes 1897–present)
Month	Jan	Feb	Mar	Apr	May	Jun	Jul	Aug	Sep	Oct	Nov	Dec	Year
Record high °C (°F)	41.6 (106.9)	43.5 (110.3)	46.1 (115.0)	48.9 (120.0)	49.0 (120.2)	49.0 (120.2)	46.0 (114.8)	46.5 (115.7)	45.0 (113.0)	48.0 (118.4)	42.5 (108.5)	40.0 (104.0)	49.0 (120.2)
Mean daily maximum °C (°F)	30.0 (86.0)	33.2 (91.8)	36.6 (97.9)	40.0 (104.0)	42.2 (108.0)	41.6 (106.9)	38.5 (101.3)	36.5 (97.7)	38.3 (100.9)	39.1 (102.4)	35.2 (95.4)	30.4 (86.7)	36.8 (98.2)
Daily mean °C (°F)	21.5 (70.7)	24.2 (75.6)	27.6 (81.7)	31.3 (88.3)	34.1 (93.4)	34.5 (94.1)	32.2 (90.0)	30.7 (87.3)	31.6 (88.9)	30.9 (87.6)	26.5 (79.7)	22.0 (71.6)	28.9 (84.0)
Mean daily minimum °C (°F)	13.0 (55.4)	15.2 (59.4)	18.5 (65.3)	22.5 (72.5)	26.0 (78.8)	27.3 (81.1)	25.8 (78.4)	24.8 (76.6)	24.8 (76.6)	22.7 (72.9)	17.7 (63.9)	13.5 (56.3)	21.0 (69.8)
Record low °C (°F)	1.7 (35.1)	7.5 (45.5)	7.0 (44.6)	8.0 (46.4)	18.5 (65.3)	17.4 (63.3)	18.0 (64.4)	20.0 (68.0)	18.9 (66.0)	13.0 (55.4)	11.0 (51.8)	3.5 (38.3)	1.7 (35.1)
Average rainfall mm (inches)	0.6 (0.02)	0.1 (0.00)	0.1 (0.00)	1.0 (0.04)	4.0 (0.16)	16.4 (0.65)	53.5 (2.11)	73.6 (2.90)	29.4 (1.16)	3.8 (0.15)	0.1 (0.00)	0.2 (0.01)	182.8 (7.20)
Average rainy days (≥ 0.1 mm)	0.1	0.1	0.1	0.6	0.9	3.2	6.6	8.1	4.7	0.8	0.0	0.1	25.3
Mean monthly sunshine hours	263.9	249.6	269.9	254.6	275.3	234.7	248.6	255.3	248.9	273.0	274.0	258.7	3,106.5
Source 1: World Meteorological Organization, NOAA (sun 1961–1990)
Source 2: Meteo Climat (record highs and lows)

Climate data for Gao, Mali (1950–2000)
Month	Jan	Feb	Mar	Apr	May	Jun	Jul	Aug	Sep	Oct	Nov	Dec	Year
Mean daily maximum °C (°F)	30.8 (87.4)	33.8 (92.8)	37.2 (99.0)	40.7 (105.3)	42.5 (108.5)	41.5 (106.7)	38.5 (101.3)	36.6 (97.9)	38.4 (101.1)	39.3 (102.7)	35.8 (96.4)	31.4 (88.5)	37.2 (99.0)
Mean daily minimum °C (°F)	14.8 (58.6)	17.0 (62.6)	20.8 (69.4)	24.7 (76.5)	28.2 (82.8)	28.8 (83.8)	26.6 (79.9)	25.4 (77.7)	26.0 (78.8)	24.9 (76.8)	19.9 (67.8)	15.8 (60.4)	22.7 (72.9)
Average rainfall mm (inches)	0.0 (0.0)	0.1 (0.00)	0.3 (0.01)	1.7 (0.07)	7.7 (0.30)	22.8 (0.90)	63.6 (2.50)	84.2 (3.31)	33.5 (1.32)	4.8 (0.19)	0.0 (0.0)	0.1 (0.00)	218.8 (8.61)
Average rainy days (≥ 0.1 mm)	0.1	0.1	0.3	0.3	1.3	3.9	7.9	8.4	5.2	0.9	0.0	0.1	28.5
Mean monthly sunshine hours	269.8	257.9	269.6	254.2	274.9	227.1	249.7	251.5	253.5	279.8	280.8	261.9	3,130.7
Source 1: World Meteorological Organization
Source 2: NOAA (sun 1961–1990)

Climate data for Kidal (1950–2000)
Month	Jan	Feb	Mar	Apr	May	Jun	Jul	Aug	Sep	Oct	Nov	Dec	Year
Mean daily maximum °C (°F)	28.0 (82.4)	31.1 (88.0)	34.8 (94.6)	38.8 (101.8)	41.5 (106.7)	41.9 (107.4)	39.9 (103.8)	38.4 (101.1)	39.1 (102.4)	38.0 (100.4)	33.4 (92.1)	28.9 (84.0)	36.2 (97.2)
Mean daily minimum °C (°F)	12.5 (54.5)	14.8 (58.6)	18.7 (65.7)	23.0 (73.4)	27.0 (80.6)	28.6 (83.5)	27.2 (81.0)	26.2 (79.2)	26.0 (78.8)	23.2 (73.8)	18.0 (64.4)	13.7 (56.7)	21.6 (70.9)
Average rainfall mm (inches)	0.6 (0.02)	0.1 (0.00)	0.2 (0.01)	1.0 (0.04)	5.3 (0.21)	11.6 (0.46)	36.8 (1.45)	45.9 (1.81)	23.1 (0.91)	3.0 (0.12)	0.2 (0.01)	0.2 (0.01)	128.0 (5.04)
Average rainy days (≥ 0.1 mm)	0.2	0.1	0.2	0.2	1.0	3.0	6.1	6.9	3.9	0.6	0.1	0.3	22.6
Mean monthly sunshine hours	274.5	267.3	286.1	283.9	294.0	230.8	269.8	276.9	271.6	296.4	286.6	275.5	3,313.4
Source 1: World Meteorological Organization
Source 2: NOAA (sun 1961–1990)

Climate data for Araouane
Month	Jan	Feb	Mar	Apr	May	Jun	Jul	Aug	Sep	Oct	Nov	Dec	Year
Mean daily maximum °C (°F)	27.2 (81.0)	31.1 (88.0)	36.7 (98.1)	43.3 (109.9)	44.4 (111.9)	46.6 (115.9)	43.9 (111.0)	42.8 (109.0)	42.8 (109.0)	39.4 (102.9)	32.8 (91.0)	28.3 (82.9)	38.3 (100.9)
Daily mean °C (°F)	18.0 (64.4)	21.1 (70.0)	26.2 (79.2)	31.4 (88.5)	33.8 (92.8)	36.7 (98.1)	35.0 (95.0)	33.9 (93.0)	34.2 (93.6)	30.3 (86.5)	24.2 (75.6)	19.1 (66.4)	28.7 (83.6)
Mean daily minimum °C (°F)	8.9 (48.0)	11.1 (52.0)	15.6 (60.1)	19.4 (66.9)	23.3 (73.9)	26.7 (80.1)	26.1 (79.0)	25.0 (77.0)	25.6 (78.1)	21.1 (70.0)	15.6 (60.1)	10.0 (50.0)	19.0 (66.3)
Average precipitation mm (inches)	1 (0.0)	1 (0.0)	0 (0)	0 (0)	0 (0)	5 (0.2)	5 (0.2)	15 (0.6)	13 (0.5)	2 (0.1)	2 (0.1)	1 (0.0)	45 (1.7)
Source: Weather and Climate in Africa

Climate data for Taoudenni
Month	Jan	Feb	Mar	Apr	May	Jun	Jul	Aug	Sep	Oct	Nov	Dec	Year
Mean daily maximum °C (°F)	26.2 (79.2)	30 (86)	32.5 (90.5)	39.8 (103.6)	42.6 (108.7)	46.7 (116.1)	47.9 (118.2)	46.6 (115.9)	44.1 (111.4)	38.6 (101.5)	31.6 (88.9)	26.4 (79.5)	37.8 (100.0)
Daily mean °C (°F)	18.1 (64.6)	21.1 (70.0)	24.4 (75.9)	29.8 (85.6)	33.1 (91.6)	37.2 (99.0)	38.8 (101.8)	37.8 (100.0)	35.9 (96.6)	30.4 (86.7)	23.9 (75.0)	18.6 (65.5)	28.2 (82.8)
Mean daily minimum °C (°F)	9.9 (49.8)	12.2 (54.0)	16.3 (61.3)	19.8 (67.6)	23.6 (74.5)	27.6 (81.7)	29.6 (85.3)	29 (84)	27.6 (81.7)	22.1 (71.8)	16.2 (61.2)	10.8 (51.4)	20.4 (68.7)
Average precipitation mm (inches)	0.5 (0.02)	0.1 (0.00)	0.0 (0.0)	0.2 (0.01)	0.2 (0.01)	0.4 (0.02)	3.0 (0.12)	8.5 (0.33)	5.4 (0.21)	1.6 (0.06)	0.5 (0.02)	0.4 (0.02)	20.8 (0.82)
Average precipitation days	0.0	0.0	0.0	0.0	0.0	0.0	0.9	1.8	0.6	0.0	0.0	0.0	3.3
Average relative humidity (%)	33.5	29.1	25.6	23.1	23.5	28.9	35.8	43.0	40.4	31.4	32.3	34.2	31.7
Source: Weatherbase

Climate data for Teghaza
Month	Jan	Feb	Mar	Apr	May	Jun	Jul	Aug	Sep	Oct	Nov	Dec	Year
Mean daily maximum °C (°F)	25.2 (77.4)	29.0 (84.2)	31.7 (89.1)	38.3 (100.9)	41.3 (106.3)	45.7 (114.3)	48.2 (118.8)	46.8 (116.2)	43.5 (110.3)	37.4 (99.3)	30.5 (86.9)	25.1 (77.2)	36.9 (98.4)
Daily mean °C (°F)	17.0 (62.6)	20.1 (68.2)	23.5 (74.3)	28.3 (82.9)	31.7 (89.1)	35.8 (96.4)	38.7 (101.7)	37.7 (99.9)	35.1 (95.2)	29.1 (84.4)	22.8 (73.0)	17.4 (63.3)	28.1 (82.6)
Mean daily minimum °C (°F)	8.8 (47.8)	11.2 (52.2)	15.3 (59.5)	18.4 (65.1)	22.2 (72.0)	26.0 (78.8)	29.2 (84.6)	28.6 (83.5)	26.7 (80.1)	20.8 (69.4)	15.2 (59.4)	9.7 (49.5)	19.3 (66.8)
Average precipitation mm (inches)	0 (0)	1 (0.0)	0 (0)	0 (0)	0 (0)	0 (0)	1 (0.0)	3 (0.1)	4 (0.2)	1 (0.0)	1 (0.0)	0 (0)	11 (0.3)
Source: Climate-Data.org

== Geology ==
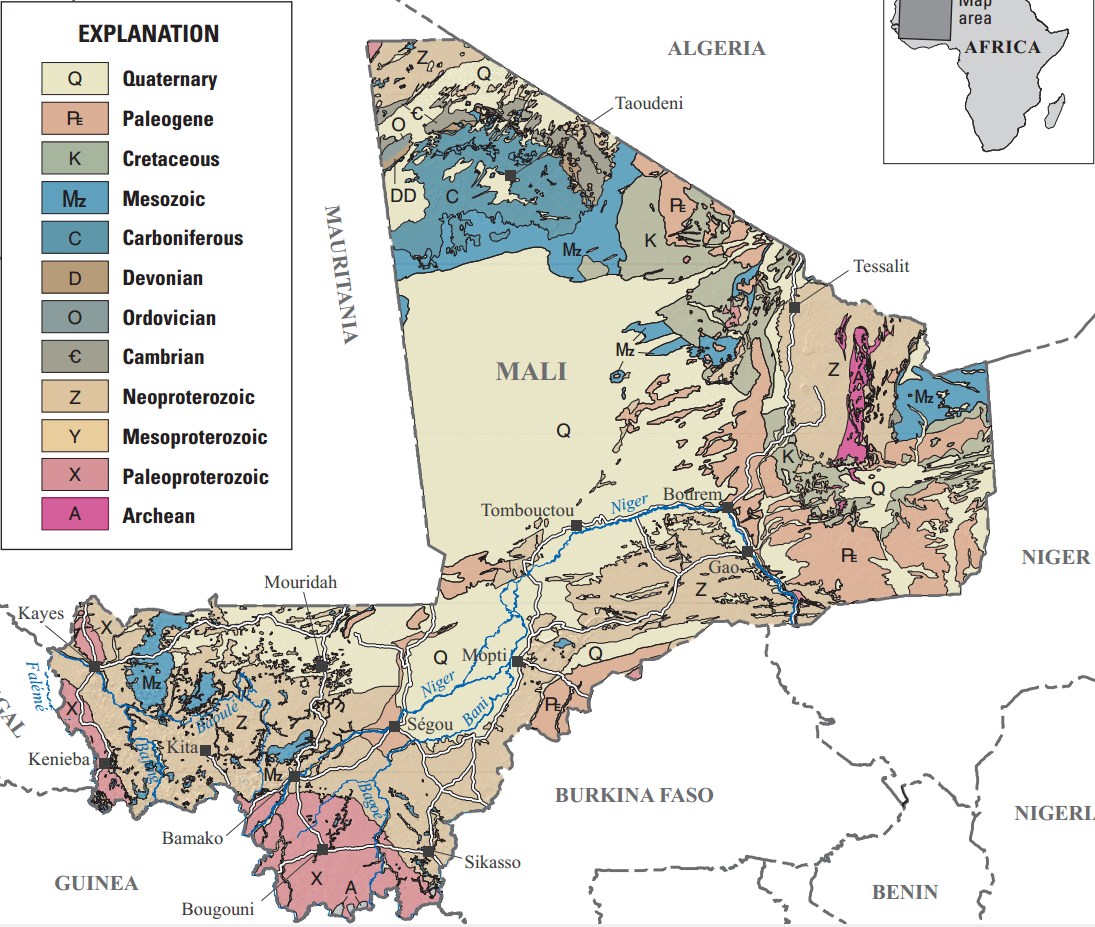
Geological map of Mali

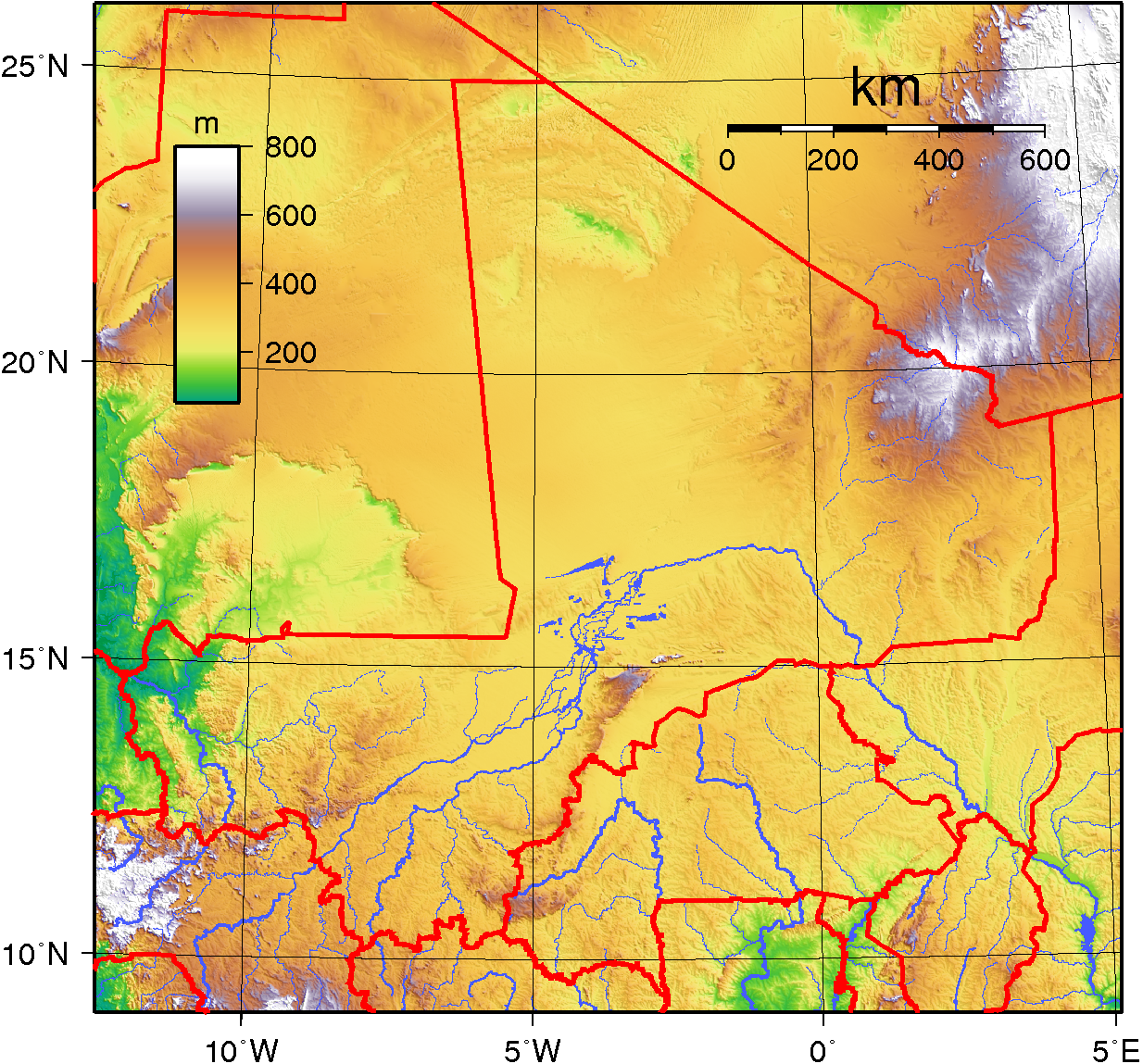
Topographical map of Mali

Geologically, Mali consists mostly of vast flatlands of granite and shale covered by sandstone and alluvial quartz. Mali extends over two main geological structures, the West African craton in the west and the Tuareg shield in the southeast, which came together at the end of the Precambrian era between 600 and 550 million years ago. The suture zone is to the west of the Adrar des Ifoghas mountains.

The underlying rocks of the West African craton are covered in the northwest by sediments of the Taoudeni basin, with two main outcrops of crystalline rocks in the northern Reguibat shield in Mauritania and the southern Leo shield which includes the Bougouni and Kenieba outcrops, both of which contain valuable minerals. There may also be petroleum reserves in the Taoudeni basin.

== Borders ==
Mali shares a total of 7,243 kilometers (4,500 miles) of land boundaries with seven bordering states:

North and northeast: Algeria- 1,376 km/855 mi

East: Niger- 821 km/510 mi

Southeast: Burkina Faso- 1,000 km/621 mi

South: Ivory Coast- 532 km/330 mi

Southwest: Guinea- 858 km/533 mi

West: Senegal and Mauritania- 419 km/260 mi and 2,237 km/1,390 mi (respectively)

== Natural resources ==
Mali is endowed with bauxite, copper, diamonds, gold, Granite, gypsum, iron ore, kaolin, limestone, lithium, manganese, phosphates, salt, silver, uranium, and zinc. Not all deposits are being exploited, and some may not be commercially viable. Mali also has ample hydropower.

== Land use ==
65% of Mali's land area is desert or semi-desert. According to estimates in 2011, only 5.63% of Mali's area can be classified as arable land, and 0.1% was planted to permanent crops. Mali was estimated to have 2,358 km2 of irrigated land in 2003. Mali has 100 cubic kilometers of total renewable water resources as off 2011 estimates.

== Environmental issues ==
Mali faces numerous environmental challenges, including desertification, deforestation, soil erosion, drought, and inadequate supplies of potable water. Deforestation is an especially serious and growing problem. According to the Ministry of the Environment, Mali's population consumes 6 million tons of wood per year for timber and fuel. To meet this demand, 400,000 hectares of tree cover are lost annually, virtually ensuring destruction of the country's savanna woodlands.

Mali is a party to international treaties on Biodiversity, Climate Change, Climate Change-Kyoto Protocol, Desertification, Endangered Species, Hazardous Wastes, Law of the Sea, Ozone Layer Protection, Wetlands, and Whaling. It has signed, but not ratified the selected agreements.

== Natural hazards ==
Natural hazards in Mali include:

- Desert sandstorms in the north
- Dust-laden harmattan wind is common during dry seasons, bringing a dust haze which may ground aircraft and damage computers and sensitive electronics and machines, as well as aggravating respiratory diseases.
- Recurring droughts
- Wildfires in the south
- Occasional floods, for example in July 2007.
- Tropical thunderstorms in the south, which may bring wind and lightning damage as well as flash floods.
- Occasional Niger River flooding

== Extreme points ==
This is a list of the extreme points of Mali, the points that are farther north, south, east or west than any other location.

- Northernmost point – the northern section of the border with Mauritania, Tombouctou Region*
- Easternmost point – the eastern section of the border with Niger**
- Southernmost point – Fonto Kourou on the border with Côte d'Ivoire, Sikasso Region
- Westernmost point – the tripoint with Senegal and Mauritania, Kayes Region
- *Note: Mali does not have a northernmost point, the border being formed by a straight east–west line
- **Note: Mali does not have an easternmost point, the border being formed by a straight north–south line

== See also ==
- Inner Niger Delta
- Manding Mountains
- 2010 Sahel famine
- List of cities in Mali
- List of rivers of Mali
- Eburnean orogeny
- Kenieba inlier
- Bambouk
- Birimian
