= Geology of Ivory Coast =

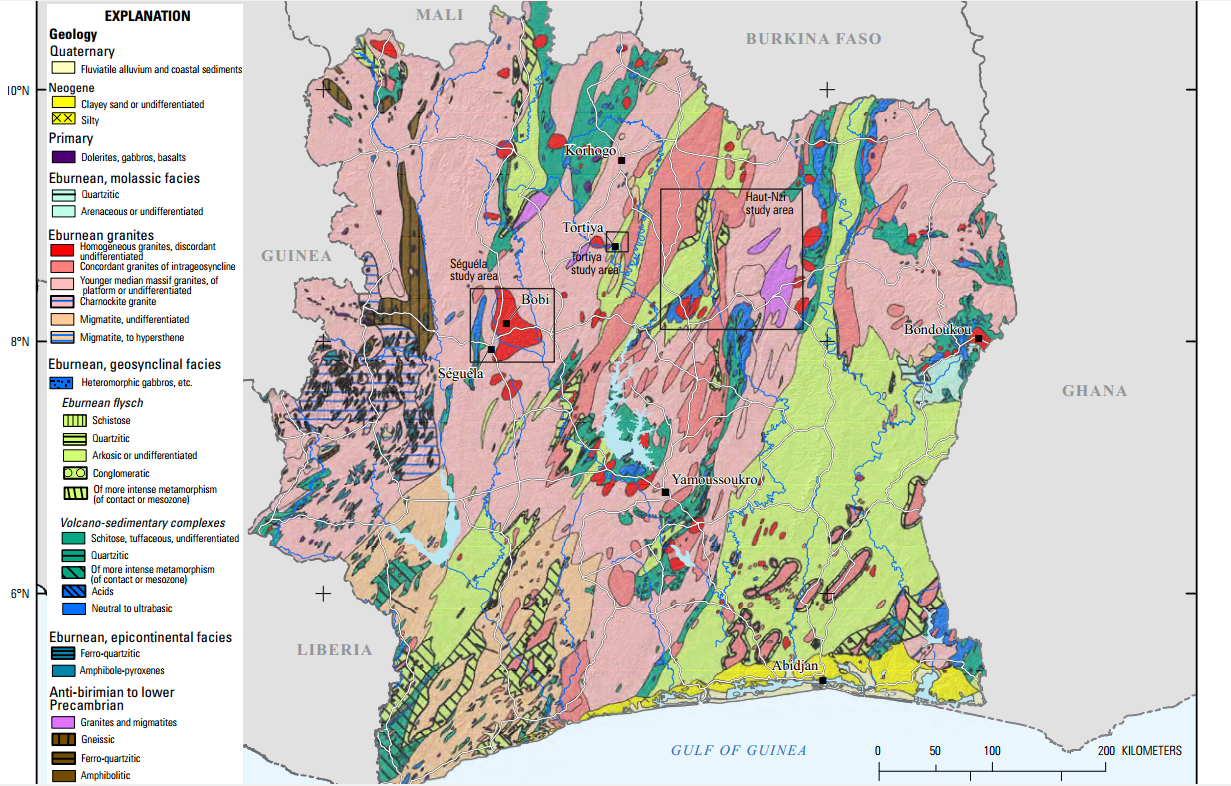
Geologic map of Ivory Coast, in which the "Eburnean, geosynclinal facies" is equivalent to the Birimian.

The geology of Ivory Coast is almost entirely extremely ancient metamorphic and igneous crystalline basement rock between 2.1 and more than 3.5 billion years old, comprising part of the stable continental crust of the West African Craton. Near the surface, these ancient rocks have weathered into sediments and soils 20 to 45 meters thick on average, which holds much of Ivory Coast's groundwater. More recent sedimentary rocks are found along the coast. The country has extensive mineral resources such as gold, diamonds, nickel and bauxite as well as offshore oil and gas.

== Stratigraphy, tectonics and geologic history ==
Virtually all of Ivory Coast is underlain by very ancient rocks from the Archean and the Paleoproterozoic that form part of the West African Craton, except for Cenozoic sediments and sedimentary rocks along the coast and in offshore basins. Weathering has rendered the upper layers of ancient Precambrian crystalline basement rock into sediments and soils.

=== Archean ===
Three billion year old Archean rocks are situated in the Kenema Domain and the Man Shield, centered around the city of Man, Ivory Coast. The rocks are granulite and migmatite gneiss, with some granitoids and banded iron formations in remnant supracrustal belts. Archean rocks were affected by two major orogeny mountain building events, the Leonian orogeny 3.5 to 2.9 billion years ago and the Liberian orogeny 2.9 to 2.5 billion years ago.

=== Paleoproterozoic ===
Paleoproterozoic terranes are separated from Archean rocks by the Sassandra mylonitic zone. The Baoule-Mossi domain in eastern Ivory Coast continues into Ghana and includes northeast–southwest trending volcanic belts, with sedimentary basins in between. The 2.9 to 2.15 billion year old volcanic belts formed from a tholeiitic magma series that experienced low-grade metamorphism and was intruded by granitoids. The sedimentary basins have isoclinal folding and contain dacite volcaniclastic rocks, greywacke and argillite.

Central Ivory Coast has a more jumbled terrain. Volcanic belts, formed 2.1 billion years ago, lack clear spacing and do not run parallel and the intervening basins are filled with granitoids and gneisses. The quartz-pebble conglomerates, arkoses and sandstones of the Tarkwaian Group outcrop in a few isolated locations near Bondoukou in the northwest. The Eburnean orogeny, 2.1 billion years ago metamorphosed many of the Paleoproterozoic rocks, creating shear zones and intruding granitoid plutons which vary between tonalite and peraluminous granite.

=== Mesozoic-Cenozoic (145 million years ago-present) ===
Coastal sedimentary basins formed as a result of the rifting apart of the supercontinent Pangaea, opening the Atlantic Ocean and now hold Ivory Coast's offshore oil and gas reserves. Clastic sediments formed throughout the Neogene and up to recent times.

== Hydrogeology ==
Fractured crystalline basement rock is the main source of groundwater in Ivory Coast. Early Precambrian granite and gneiss rocks store groundwater in deep fractures and in weathered sand and clay layers at the surface, ranging between 20 and 30 meters thick and occasionally as much as 60 meters. Near surface weathering in cocoa producing regions of the country has resulted in a layer of clay and argillaceous material, with low permeability and limited groundwater, in Late Precambrian Birrimian aquifers. The schists typically have a 45-meter thickness of weathered material. Water does occur 20 to 30 meters deep in sands and in cracks in the volcanic rock. Well drilling teams need to remove clay from the borehole to prevent fine particles from blocking well screens.

Along the coast, Ivory Coast has a deep, high transmissivity and unconfined sedimentary aquifer formed in the Cretaceous, Paleogene and Neogene. It is overlain by Quaternary marine sands formed in the last 2.5 million years. This high productivity aquifer recharges quickly from rainfall and has a lower layer of clay that often separates freshwater from saline water.

== Natural resource geology ==
Ivory Coast has significant mineral deposits, but mining has not played a major role in the economy of Ivory Coast. Gold is one of the most notable resources. Native gold is hosted in steeply dipping quartz veins near the boundaries of volcanic belts and sedimentary basins, disseminated in massive sulfide deposits or as alluvial gold in river gravels. In other cases, paleoplacer alluvial gold is included in conglomerates and sericite and quartz schist in the Tarkwaian Group. The Aniuri Mine in southeast Ivory Coast is an example of auriferous quartz veins in the Afema shear zone (a continuation of the Bibiani shear zone from Ghana). Babadougou and Toulepleu both have alluvial gold mines.

Diamonds are also found in alluvial deposits, south of Korhoga at Tortiya as well as at Seguela. Kanangone, Seguela and Tortiya all have kimberlite dikes but none contain diamonds. Iron is another important resource in Ivory Coast. The Monogaga deposit near Sassandra is a Minette Oolitic type iron deposit formed in the Miocene and Pliocene and has a 40% iron concentration. Mt. Gao, Segaye, Tia, Tortro and Klahoyo all have Lake Superior type magnetite deposits. Biankoumo has nickel-rich laterite soils atop amphibolite gneisses, close to the border with Guinea. In some cases, nickel deposits have appreciable amounts of cobalt.

Manganese occurs as carbonates, silicates and oxides and reaches concentrations of 47% in lenticular bodies, drilled into in the northwest of the country. Underlying phyllite and gondite became enriched in manganese near the Blafa-Gueto hills and Mokta, forming the residual caps. Ivory Coast also has bauxite, nickel and copper deposits associated platinum group minerals, as well as titanium and tantalite in beach sands. Ivory Coast also has modest offshore oil and gas reserves.
