= N'Tentou =

N'Tentou Ténétou
- Town
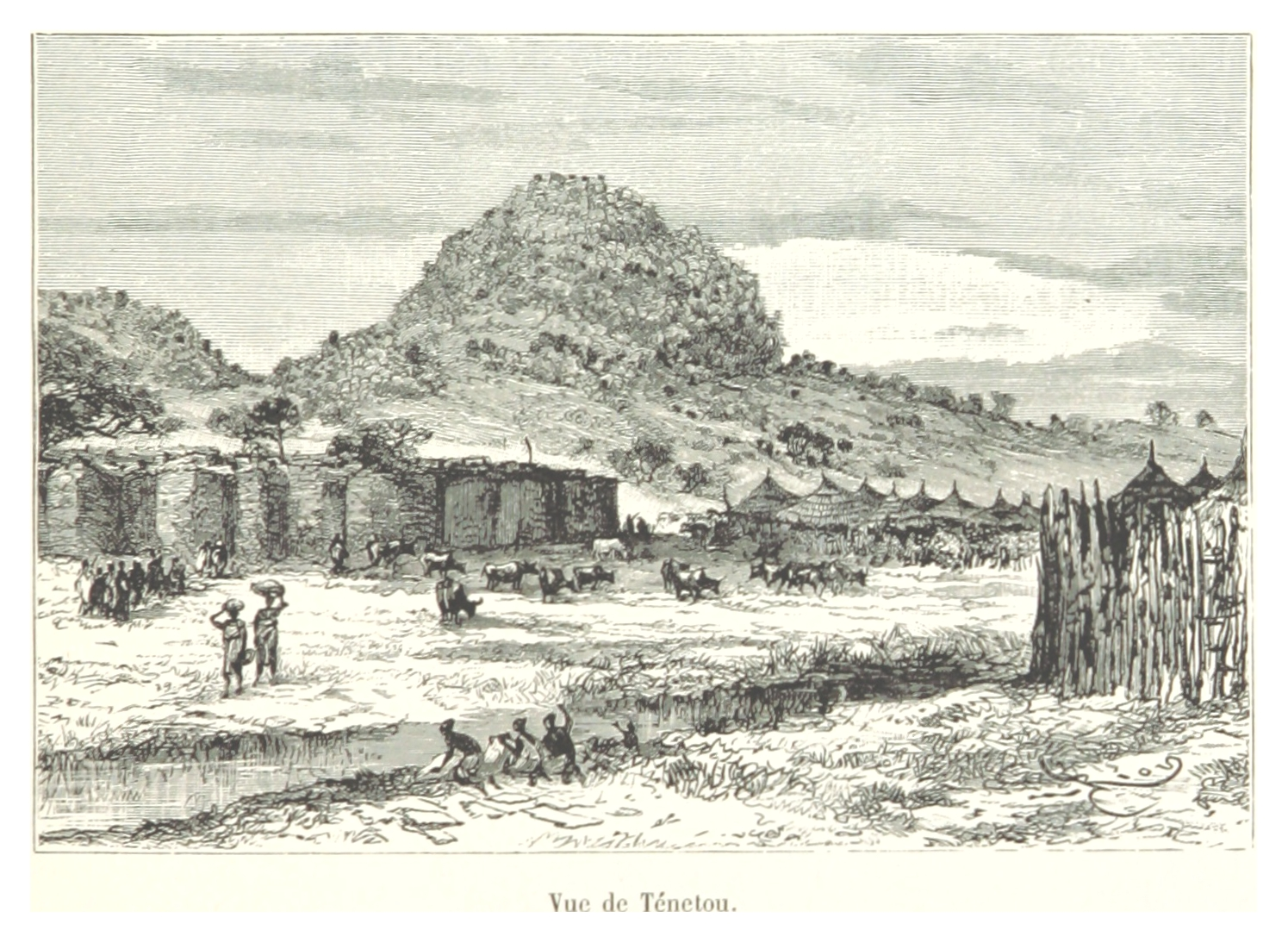
- N'Tentou in 1892

- Location in Mali
- Coordinates: 11.3533483800765°N 7.72124866310904°W
- Country: Mali
- Region: Sikasso Region
- Cercle: Bougouni Cercle
- Commune: Kouroulamini
- Time zone: UTC+0 (GMT)

N'Tentou or Ténétou is a town and seat of the commune of Kouroulamini in the Cercle of Bougouni in the Sikasso Region of southern Mali. Historically one of the main towns of the Wassoulou region, N'Tentou was, until the late 19th century, surrounded by a large tata made of mud, stones and karité. The outer wall was over 10 feet (3.0 m) high and several kilometres long, with three even larger interior enclosures.

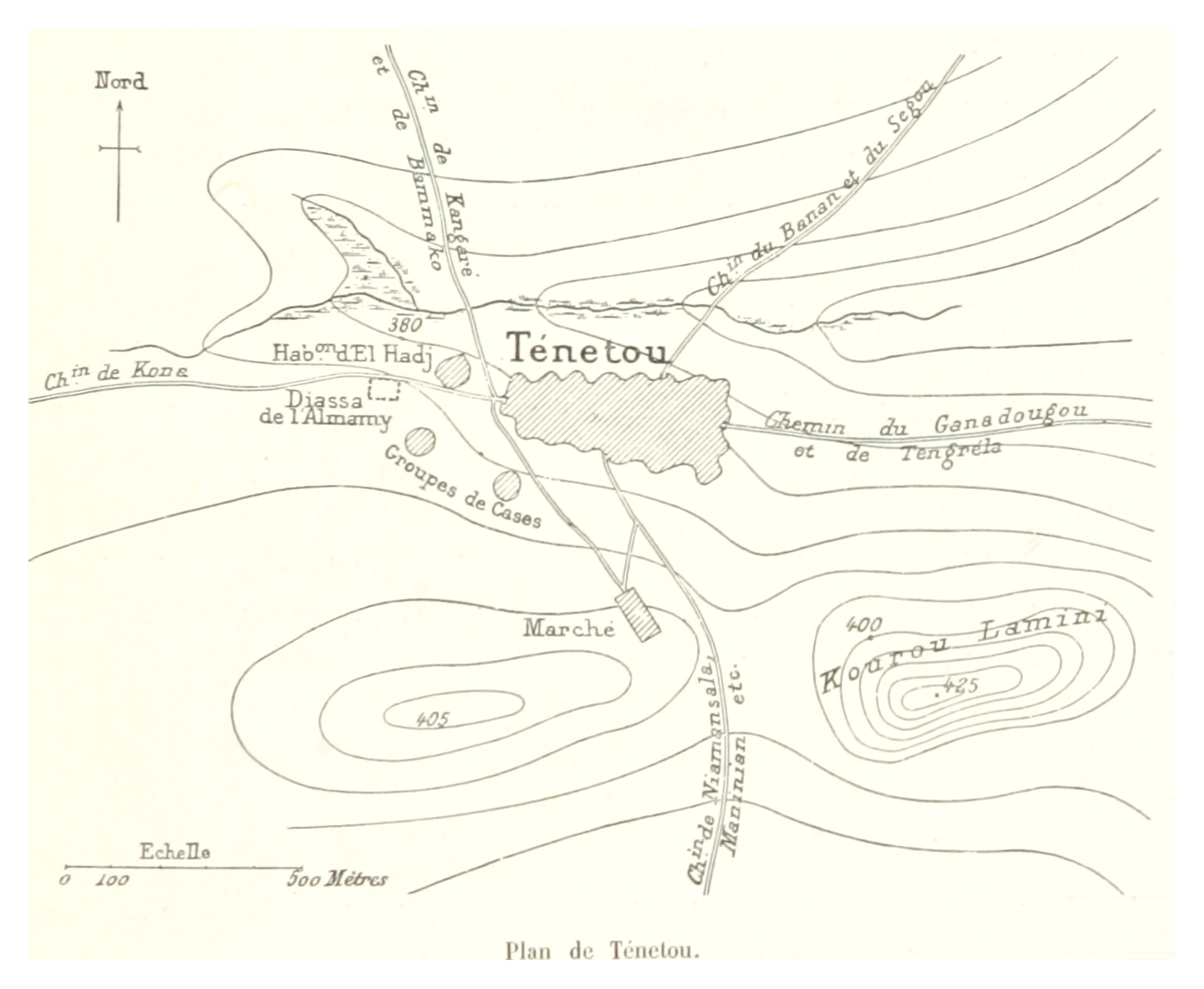
Map of Tenetou, 1892

N'Tentou was a part of Samory Toure's Wassoulou Empire, supporting him even after the disastrous failure of the 1888 siege of Sikasso, when much of the rest of the Wassoulou region rebelled. In the early 1890s, however, a French colonial force was marching on the town. Toure's forces ordered the population to move east, but they refused. The Wassoulou army assaulted the town and massacred the inhabitants. When the French arrived, they found around 3000 corpses filling the town, and set up their headquarters in Bougouni instead of N'Tentou to avoid the smell.
