= Birim River =

River in Ghana

Coordinates: 5°59′30″N 0°50′0″W

Pra River and major tributaries, including the Birim

The Birim River is one of the main tributaries of the Pra River in Ghana and the country's most important diamond-producing area, flowing through most of the width of the Eastern region. The river rises in the east of the Atewa Range, flows north through the gap between this range and the Kwahu Plateau, then runs roughly south-west until it joins the Pra. It gives its name to the Birimian rock formation, which yields most of the gold in the region. Ghana is the second largest producer of gold in Africa.

== Geology ==
The Birim River basin lies in the Man Shield area of the West African craton, which has been overlaid by Early Proterozoic metasedimentary Birimian rocks. These rocks appear to have originated in mid-oceanic arcs of volcanoes, which formed a crust that collided with and rode over the Man shield portion of the West African Craton and was compressed to form a series of folds generally trending northeasterly. The Birimian rocks include Akwatian formations, named after the town of Akwatia in the Birim valley, which have yielded more than 100,000,000 carats (20,000 kg) of diamonds. The great majority of the diamonds are found in Harzburgitic rocks and seem to have crystallized at unusually high temperatures and pressures deep in the lithosphere.

== Environment ==
The river rises in the Kibi or Akim district of the Eastern Region of Ghana, in the Atewa Range, which rises to 780m. The surrounding lowlands are about 180–200m above sea level. Much of the Atewa range is a forest reserve, with large areas of primary forest holding many rare plant, animal and insect species despite persistent timber poaching. There are many unstudied archeological sites. The Kibi area has 1500–2000mm of rain annually.

The Birim basin is in the wet semi-equatorial zone of Ghana. There are two rainy seasons, one from May to June and the second from September to October. In the drier seasons, temperatures are around 26 °C in August and 30 °C in March. Relative humidity is 70% - 80% throughout the year. At one time covered by dense tropical forest, large areas have been cleared for farming. Ghana's forest area dropped from 8.2 million hectares around 1900 to 1.6 million hectares by 2000, and continues to decline due to demand for exports and for construction material by the growing population. Managed plantations are being introduced and may help to reverse the decline.

The river water contains levels of faecal coliforms and streptococci, mostly of human origin but in some cases due to pollution from livestock operations, that make it unsafe to drink without treatment. Below Akwatia the river holds high levels of silt from the mining operations.

=== Galamsey ===
The Birim river has been degraded as a result of illegal mining activities. The community members and some organizations have requested the government to take action against the illegal miners and protect the river. A group has been formed which consist of 62 people to assist in protecting the river.

== Mineral wealth ==
The Birim basin is rich in minerals and has been a source of gold for centuries, the basis for the former name of Ghana: the Gold Coast. It is also a major source of diamonds.

=== Gold ===
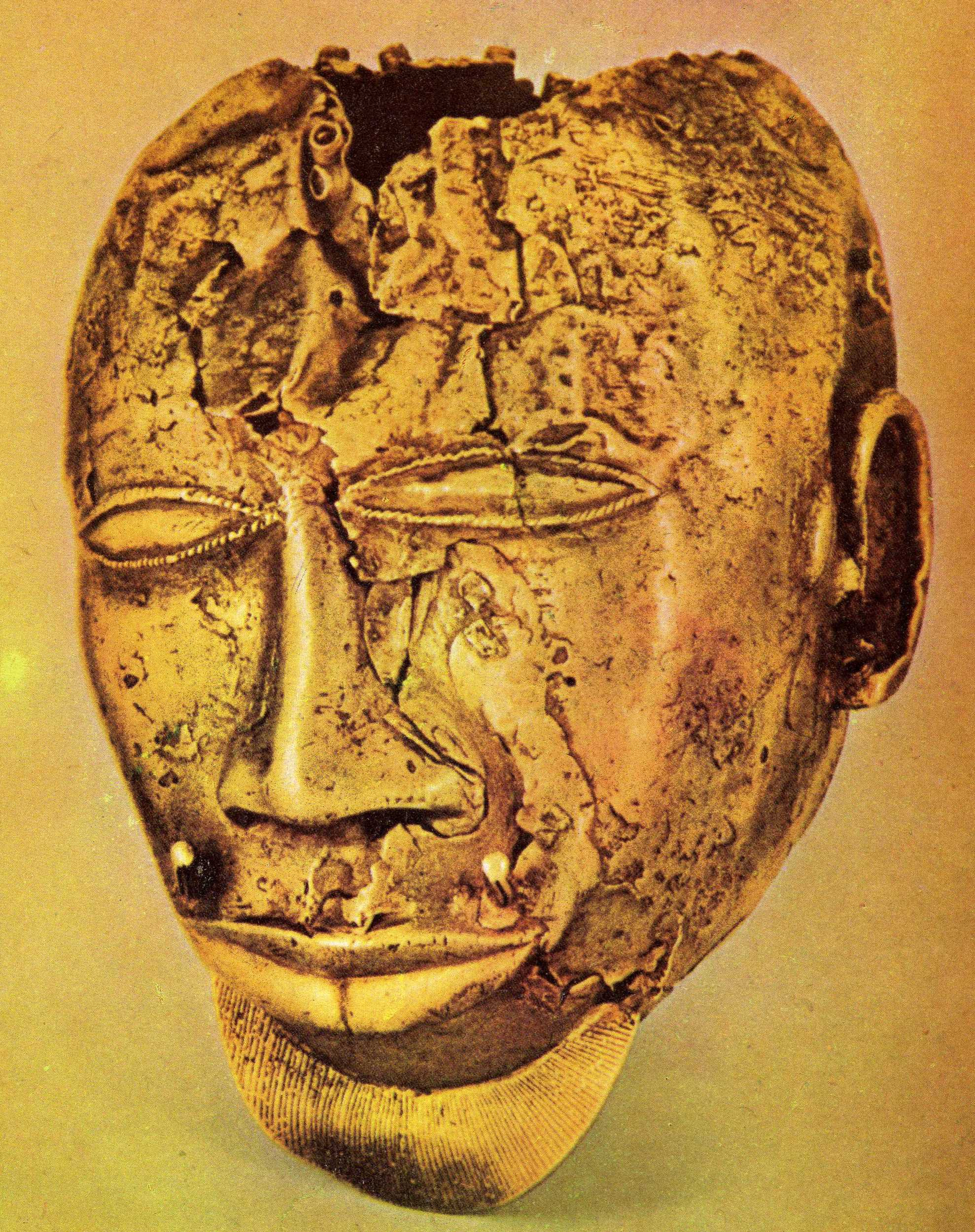
Gold mask from the treasure of the Ashanti king Kofi Kolkalli

The Birim river gravels hold gold which has long been extracted through panning or Placer mining, used in making ornaments and for trans-Saharan trade long before the Europeans discovered the Gold Coast. Starting in the late 19th century, British gold mining companies adopted conventional mining and extraction processes, developing deep underground mines in the underlying Ashanti belt. After independence in 1957 the government nationalized the gold mining industry. With inadequate investment, the mines deteriorated and profitability fell. However, after privatization in 1992 the new owners injected capital, mostly into the Ashanti belt mines, discovering new world-class deposits. The Ashanti Belt now has an aggregated gold endowment of over 125,000,000 ounces of gold.

=== Diamonds ===
Ghana has produced gems from alluvial gravels since the 1920s, mostly industrial grade. In the early 1990s the government announced plans to privatize its diamond-mining operations but found no buyers. The government still owns Ghana Consolidated Diamonds, since 2005 the only formal commercial producer of diamonds. Ghana Consolidated Diamonds uses a strip and mine method at their placer mine in Akwatia, using Manitowoc draglines. The plant is old and obsolescent, available only 38% of the time and producing under capacity. The government is looking for a strategic investor to take over the mine.

In 1989 the government of Ghana set up the Precious Minerals Marketing Corporation (PMMC) to promote small-scale gold and diamond mining and to purchase and resell the output. As much as 70% of the diamonds were smuggled out of the country before the PMMC was created. In its first sixteen months of operation, the PMMC bought 382,423 carats (76.4846 kg) of diamonds and 20,365 ounces of gold and sold 230,000 carats (46 kg) of diamonds worth US$8 million. However, because of complaints over raw gem sales, the government in March 1992 ordered an investigation into the operations of the state agency and suspended its managing director.

In the 1950s and 1960s the Akwatia area of the Birim valley produced more than 2,000,000 carats (400 kg) annually. However, both volumes and quality are declining. Ghana produced a total of about 800,000 carats (160 kg) of diamonds in 1995, about half of it from Akwatia. The available reserves cover an area of 240 km^{2} along the Birim River and are estimated to contain 14,000,000 carats (2,800 kg) of proven reserve. Although the Akwatia deposits are nearly depleted, large additional resources have been identified in the nearby Birim River deposits, including an altered meta-lamproite that may represent a primary diamond source.

Most of the diamond production in the Birim basin is now by artisanal miners from alluvial and in situ diamond deposits near Akwatia. There is some evidence that production volumes from these small-scale operations are increasing.

=== Bauxite ===
The Atewa Range at the headwaters of the river contains extensive bauxite deposits with minor kaolin occurrences, which are being evaluated by groups such as BHP. However, the bauxite deposits are generally poor quality compared to larger deposits of higher-quality bauxite in nearby Guinea and are in an environmentally sensitive area, so are unlikely to be developed.

== Farming ==
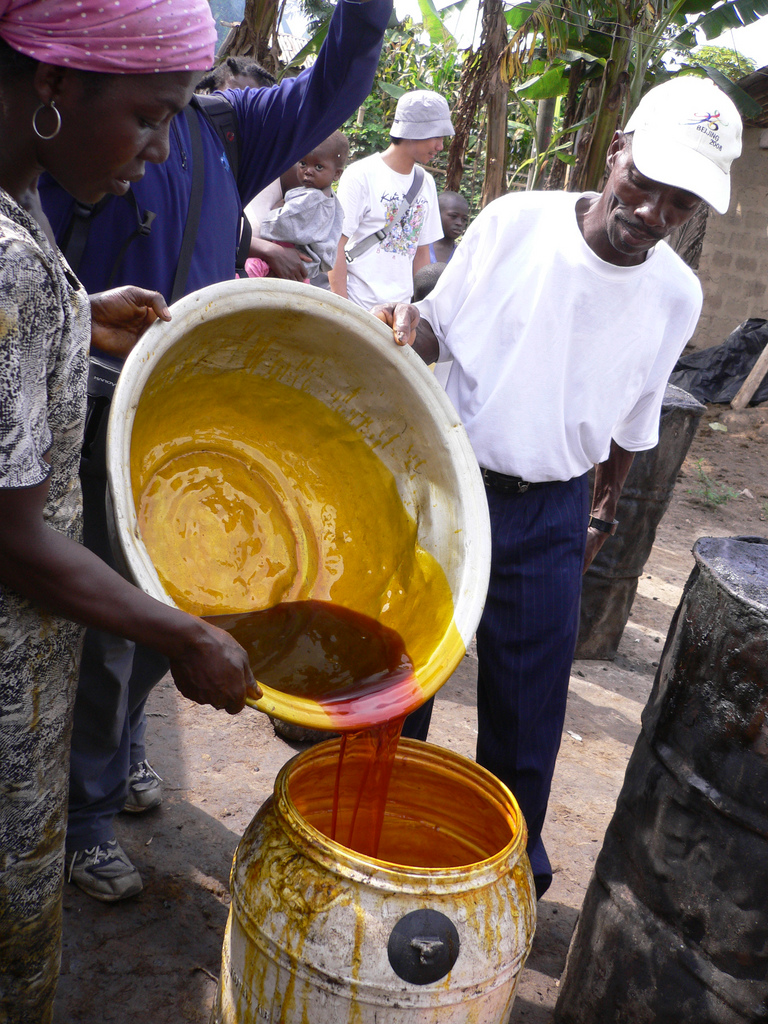
Palm oil production in Jukwa, Ghana

The fertile soil and warm, humid climate of the Birim basin support staple food crops such as cassava, yam, cocoyam, maize, rice and vegetables, and commercially more valuable crops such as citrus, pineapple, pawpaw and cola nut. The region also produces exotic crops such as black and sweet pepper, ginger, cashew nuts, rubber and mangoes, which are gaining importance as export commodities. Cocoa farming is one of the more important sources of income, with the dried product exported for further processing. Palm oil production is also increasing, with byproducts used for making soap locally. Bamboo is another important crop. The fast-growing plant provides inexpensive material for construction and in furniture making.

== Tourism ==
The government is attempting to develop the tourist industry in the region. The Atewa Range forest reserve is managed by the Okyeman Environment Foundation, which has restricted farming to encourage eco-tourism. The Birim South District has waterfalls, historic sites and nine forest reserves. The Ghana Tourist Development Board, in collaboration with the District Assembly and Traditional Authorities has developed a Business Plan for developing the "Big Tree" site in the Esen Epan Forest Reserve near Akim Oda as a tourist site, in cooperation with the private sector. This site has the biggest tree in West Africa at 12 meters in circumference and 66.5 meters tall. Working with the University of Georgia, plans are being made to improve the access roads, eating and relaxation places, souvenirs and shops.

In the town of Akyem (Akim) Oda, the capital of the Birim South District, attractions include dug-out boat tours to view the mining operations, traditional ceremonies usually including drumming performances and an outdoor market. The local food is also presented as a tourist attraction.
