= Kologo =

- Village
- Location in Mali
- Coordinates: 11.223°N 7.491°W
- Country: Mali
- Region: Sikasso Region
- Cercle: Bougouni Cercle
- Commune: Tiémala-Banimonotié
- Time zone: UTC+0 (GMT)

Kologo is a village and seat of the commune of Tiémala-Banimonotié in the Cercle of Bougouni in the Sikasso Region of southern Mali. The village is 25 km south of the town of Bougouni, the administrative center for the cercle.
