= Torakoro =

- Town
- Country: Mali
- Region: Sikasso Region
- Cercle: Bougouni Cercle
- Commune: Danou
- Time zone: UTC+0 (GMT)

Torakoro is a town and seat of the commune of Danou in the Cercle of Bougouni in the Sikasso Region of southern Mali.
