= Manankoro =

- Town
- Location in Mali
- Coordinates: 10°28′N 7°27′W
- Country: Mali
- Region: Sikasso Region
- Cercle: Bougouni Cercle
- Commune: Sibirila
- Time zone: UTC+0 (GMT)

Manankoro is a town and seat of the commune of Sibirila in the Cercle of Bougouni in the Sikasso Region of southern Mali. It is the principal town of the commune.
