= Geology of the Sahrawi Arab Democratic Republic =

The geology of Western Sahara includes rock units dating back to the Archean more than two billion years old, although deposits of phosphorus formed in the Mesozoic and Cenozoic have helped to prompt the current Moroccan occupation of most of the country.

== Stratigraphy and tectonics ==
Eastern Western Sahara is underlain by Archean rocks in the Reguibat Shield. Ouled Dhlim, a unit of the Mauritanid Orogen outcrops in south-central Western Sahara, while the Zemmour Domain is the southern extent of the Anti-Atlas Domain in Morocco. The western part of the country is made up of coastal basin sediments and the south has extensive sand dunes.

=== Archean-Proterozoic ===
The Reguibat Shield is part of the West African Craton, a large area of stable continental crust left over from the early formation of continents. Migmatite forms the core of the shield, overlain by imbricated gneiss belts in the Tiris region, in the east. The Tiris Series is made up of sequences of granulite and amphibolite.

The Zemmour Domain is the periphery of the West African Craton and has carbonates at its base, that store the remains of stromatolites, likely from the Neoproterozoic.

=== Paleozoic (541-251 million years ago) ===
The stromalite carbonates are overlain by sandstone, shale and graptolite in the Oumat el Ham Group, dating to the Ordovician. Western Sahara was affected by glaciation at the end of the Ordovician, creating erosion at the base of the overlying Garat el-Hamoueid Group. Marine transgression in the Silurian formed graptolite in shale and clay and then shifted to coral-reefs that became limestone.

Extensive sedimentation in the Devonian preserved brachiopod, bryozoan and coral fossils in sequences of oolitic limestone, sandstone, siltstone and clay up to one kilometer thick. The Ouled Dhlim unit is a grouping of nappe thrust sheets, mostly from the Neoproterozoic, but with some units from the Paleozoic, dating to the Cambrian and Ordovician, thrust eastward onto the West African Craton by the Mauritanide orogeny.

=== Mesozoic (251-66 million years ago) ===
At the beginning of the Mesozoic, the Aaiun-Tarfaya coastal basin filled with clastic material and evaporate deposits, as well as basalt extruded during rifting. Marine transgression in the Jurassic formed carbonate, marl and clastic sequences, overlain by additional clastic sequences from the Cretaceous.

=== Cenozoic (66 million years ago-present) ===
Clastic sequences continued to form in the Paleogene, the first 43 million years of the Cenozoic. Within that time frame, an unconformity emerged, in which Paleocene and Eocene sediments sit directly atop units from the Cretaceous. Sediments from the Pleistocene and Holocene, in the last 2.5 million years of the Quaternary are found in large sand dunes in southeastern Western Sahara as well as large lake beds throughout the country.

== Hydrogeology ==
Parts of southern and north-central Western Sahara have multilayer unconsolidated sand and gravel aquifers, from the Cenozoic, subdivided by impermeable silt and clay layers. Nearly 50% of the country has sandstone aquifers, ranging in age from the Paleozoic to the Cenozoic. In the south and east, fractured Precambrian basement rock stores some water, but with very limited recharge due to exceedingly low rainfall totals. Karstic aquifers occur in a few limited places near the Moroccan border in the north.

== Natural resource geology ==
Mining in Western Sahara is limited to phosphate extraction, in the Moroccan occupation zone, particularly from a large mine at Bou Craa. Western Sahara has some of the world's large phosphate deposits and is projected to play a key role as phosphorus scarcity and potential peak phosphorus approach in the mid-21st century. Hydrocarbon exploration offshore of Tarfaya, close to the Moroccan border did not yield results.
