= Balla Koné =

- Born: July 1, 1920; Bougouni, French Sudan
- Died: December 16, 1985 (65 years old) Bamako, Mali
- Rank: Corps commander
- Known for: Founding Mali's gendarmerie
- Conflicts: World War II; First Indochina War; Algerian War
- Other work: Malian Minister of Information and Security (1968-1970); Head of Bamako Municipal Council (1969-1970)

Balla Koné (July 1, 1920 in Bougouni - December 16, 1985 in Bamako) was a Malian soldier considered to be the founder of the country's gendarmerie.

== Biography ==
Koné was born on July 1, 1920, in Bougouni, then French West Africa. He attended school in Kati and Saint-Louis before volunteering for the French colonial army. Koné participated in WWII, and later participated in the First Indochina War and the Algerian War. After his service, Koné studied at the military school at Fréjus and Melun in the late 1950s. Koné then served in the gendarmerie of French Sudan, which later became the Republican Guard of the Mali Federation, where he served as corps commander. After the disintegration of the Mali Federation and independence of Mali in 1960, the Republican Guard was separated from the gendarmerie and the leader became Boubacar Traoré. Koné commanded the gendarmerie until the 1968 Malian coup d'état.

After the 1968 coup, Koné served as Minister of Information Security from 1968 to 1970, and head of the Bamako municipal council from 1969 to 1970. He retired in 1970. The school of the gendarmerie, Squadron Leader Balla Koné Barracks, was named in his honor.
