= Ouroumpana =

- Town
- Location in Mali
- Coordinates: 10°53′N 7°9′W
- Country: Mali
- Region: Sikasso Region
- Cercle: Bougouni Cercle
- Commune: Yiridougou
- Time zone: UTC+0 (GMT)

Ouroumpana is a town and seat of the commune of Yiridougou in the Cercle of Bougouni in the Sikasso Region of southern Mali.
