= Sido =

Sido may refer to:

- Sani Souna Sido, Nigerien soldier and vice president
- Sido (rapper), stage name of Paul Würdig, a German rapper
- Sido (island), a South Korean island
- Sido, Mali
