= Birimian =

African gold and diamond sources

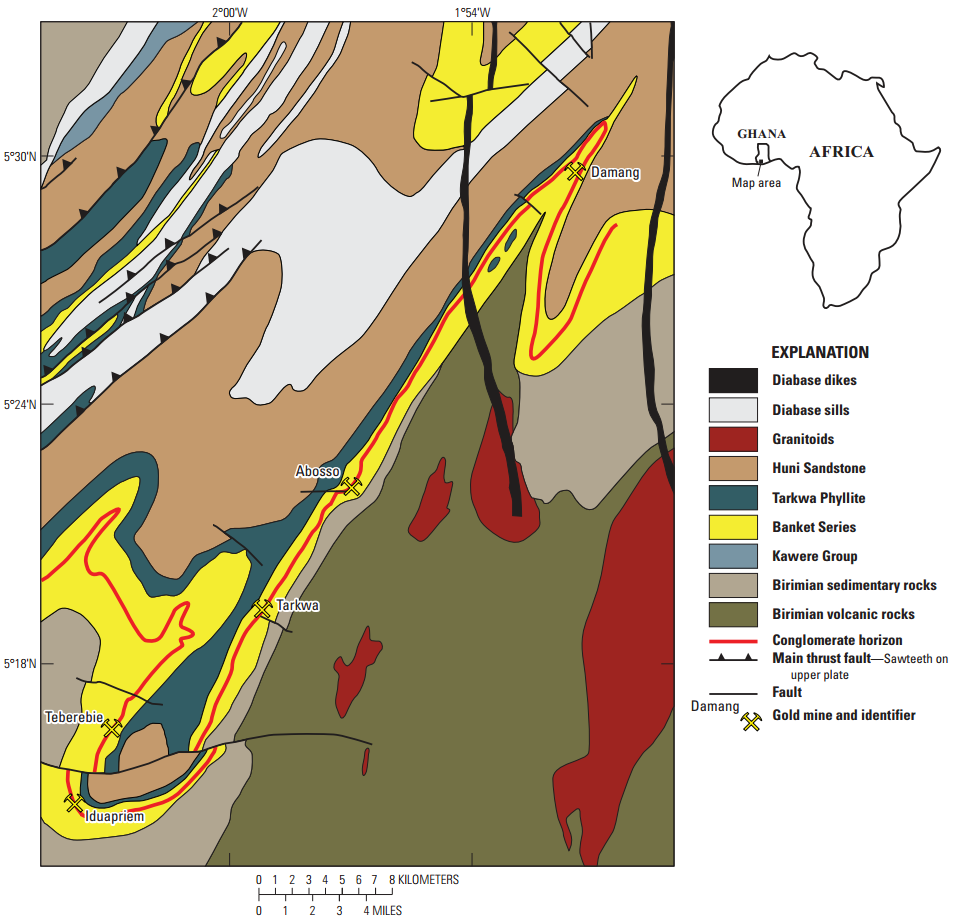
Geological map of the Tarkwa gold district in Ghana showing significant folding and faulting of the Birimian

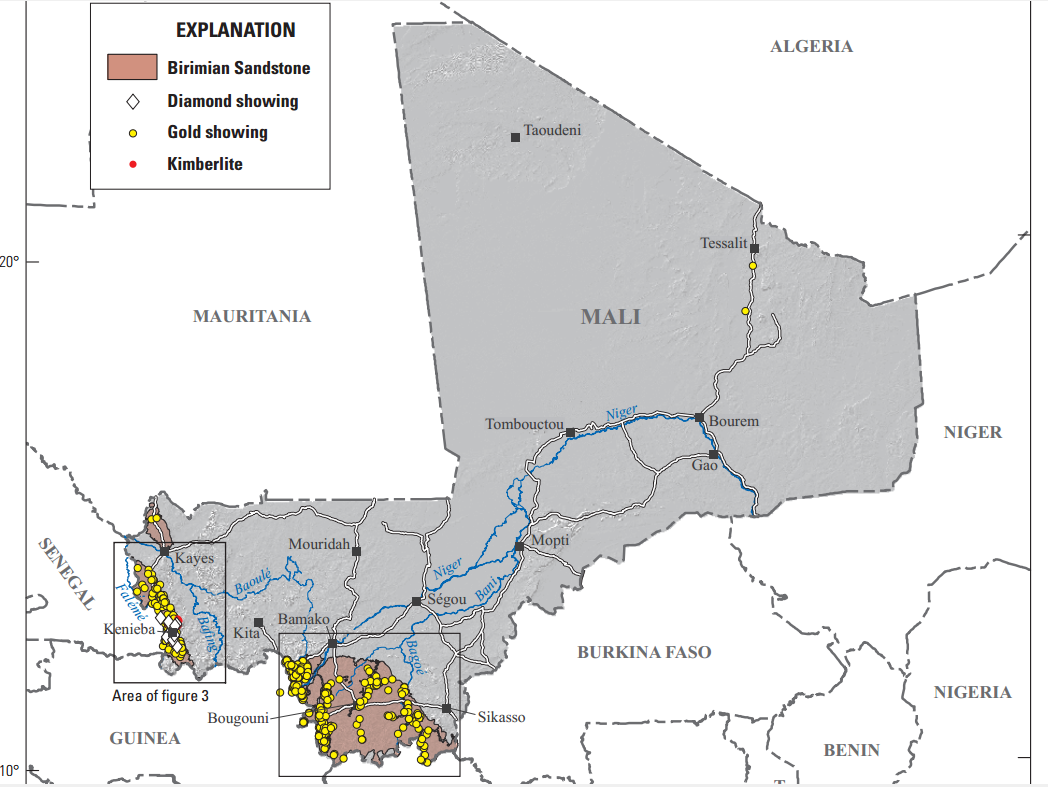
Geological map of Birimian outcrops in Mali, at Bougouni and Kenieba

The Birimian rocks are major sources of gold and diamonds that extend through Ghana, Côte d'Ivoire, Guinea, Mali and Burkina Faso. They are named after the Birim River, one of the main tributaries of the Pra River in Ghana and the country's most important diamond-producing area. Ghana and Mali are the second and third largest producers of gold in Africa, respectively.

The Birimian terranes in the southern part of the West African craton are a mix of metamorphosed volcanic, sedimentary, and plutonic rocks and low-grade metavolcanics and metasediments. Almost half of the terranes consist of alkaline granites. The rocks formed over a period of about 50 million years between 2.200 Ga and 2.100 Ga years ago.

== Location ==
The Birimian rocks stretch across the countries to the north of the Gulf of Guinea, forming parallel belts that generally trend northeasterly and are 40 to 50 kilometres (25 to 31 mi) wide and about 90 kilometres (56 mi) apart. They consist of interlayered sedimentary and volcanic flow rocks metamorphosed to low greenschist facies. Most rivers draining the Birimian rocks hold alluvial gold deposits. They are overlaid in places by quartz-pebble conglomerates within the Tarkwaian System, name after Tarkwa, the second largest source of gold in Ghana. However, recent research indicates that the gold found in the Tarkwaian rocks is not derived from the Birimian terranes.

The Birimian forms two distinct and parallel greenstone belts in southwest Burkina Faso, the Hounde and the Boromo. The Hounde Greenstone Belt extends from the Ivory Coast border to the north of Houndé. The Boromo Greenstone Belt to the east of the Hounde Greenstone Belt, also extends from the Ivory Coast border through the Poura mine, Boromo and north to Ouahigouya and Kaya.

== Origins ==
One view is that the Birimian rocks were formed by the collision of the Archean Cupixi-Carajas craton in the Southern Guiana shield and the Kenema-Man craton in the Western Africa shield. However, it is more generally accepted that the rocks originated in mid-oceanic arcs of volcanoes, which formed a crust that collided with and rode over the Man Shield portion of the West African Craton and was compressed to form the series of folds.

== Mining operations ==
Gold mining has been an important part of the economies of Ghana and Mali for centuries. In Ghana, over 90 percent of output originates from underground mines in the Ashanti region of the country. The privatized Ashanti Goldfields Corporation, formed in 1993 with investment from Lonrho and now owned by AngloGold Ashanti, controls most production and generally uses environmentally acceptable processes. However, there are many small-scale miners using techniques causing environmental damage such as arsenic and mercury poisoning.

Gold quartz veins and lenticular reefs occur in the shear zone between the Upper Birimian phyllites and the Lower Birimian greenstones. Gold mines include the Obuasi Gold Mine, and those located at Prestea, Konongo, Hiré, Poura, Kalana, and Sabodala. Placer gold deposits are mined at Siguiri, Ity, and on the Ofin River.

== See also ==
- Geology of Ghana
- Geology of Mali
- Geology of Ivory Coast
- Geology of Burkina Faso
- Eburnean orogeny
- Kenieba inlier
- Bambouk
- Bougouni
- Kenieba
- Siguiri
- Akan goldweights
