= Syen Toula =

Coordinates: 12°12′43″N 7°52′22″W

- Commune and town
- Interactive map of Syen Toula
- Country: Mali
- Region: Sikasso Region
- Cercle: Bougouni Cercle

Population (1998)
  - Total: 5,825
- Time zone: UTC+0 (GMT)

Syen Toula is a small town and commune in the Cercle of Bougouni in the Sikasso Region of southern Mali. In 1998 the commune had a population of 5,825.
