= Wola, Mali =

Coordinates: 11°44′24″N 6°40′16″W

Wola
- Commune and town
- Interactive map of Wola
- Country: Mali
- Region: Sikasso Region
- Cercle: Bougouni Cercle

Population (1998)
  - Total: 10,158
- Time zone: UTC+0 (GMT)

Wola is a small town and commune in the Cercle of Bougouni in the Sikasso Region of south-western Mali. In 1998 the commune had a population of 10,158.
