= Danou, Mali =

Coordinates: 12°08′49″N 7°15′16″W

Danou
- Commune
- Interactive map of Danou
- Country: Mali
- Region: Sikasso Region
- Cercle: Bougouni Cercle

Population (1998)
  - Total: 8,869
- Time zone: UTC+0 (GMT)

Danou is a commune in the Cercle of Bougouni in the Sikasso Region of southern Mali. The principal town lies at Torakoro. In 1998 the commune had a population of 8,869.
