= Ouroun =

Coordinates: 11°42′05″N 7°55′11″W

- Commune and town
- Interactive map of Ouroun
- Country: Mali
- Region: Sikasso Region
- Cercle: Bougouni Cercle

Population (1998)
  - Total: 3,947
- Time zone: UTC+0 (GMT)

Ouroun is a small town and commune in the Cercle of Bougouni in the Sikasso Region of southern Mali. In 1998 the commune had a population of 3,947.

The population composed mainly of three ethnic groups: Bambara, Malinkés and Fulani. Ouroun is naturally divided into two districts: Sokoundéni and Sokoumba. The first is located southeast of the city, while the second is slightly north to south. With a population almost three times larger than that of Sokoundeni, Sokoumba is also divided by its inhabitants in two parts: Kourou and Kodjou. The latter is more inhabited than the first.

== Geography ==
Ouroun has a tropical climate. In summer, there is less rainfall than in winter. According to the Köppen-Geiger climate classification, the climate is As. The average annual temperature in Ouroun is 27.1 °C. The rainfall here averages 1103 mm.

The driest month is December, with 0 mm of rainfall. The greatest amount of precipitation occurs in August, with an average of 291 mm.

With an average temperature of 30.7 °C, April is the warmest month of the year in Ouroun. At the same time January is the coldest month with an average of 24.2 °C. The precipitation varies 291 mm between the driest and the wettest months. The difference between the lowest and the highest temperature is 6.5 °C.
