= Defina =

Coordinates: 11°01′28″N 7°09′06″W

- Commune and town
- Interactive map of Defina
- Country: Mali
- Region: Sikasso Region
- Cercle: Bougouni Cercle

Population (1998)
  - Total: 6,109
- Time zone: UTC+0 (GMT)

Defina is a small town and commune in the Cercle of Bougouni in the Sikasso Region of southern Mali. In 1998 the commune had a population of 6,109.
