= Kokele =

Coordinates: 11°31′N 7°33′W

- Commune and town
- Interactive map of Kokele
- Country: Mali
- Region: Sikasso Region
- Cercle: Bougouni Cercle

Population (1998)
  - Total: 5,753
- Time zone: UTC+0 (GMT)

Kokele is a small town and commune in the Cercle of Bougouni in the Sikasso Region of southern Mali. In 1998 the commune had a population of 5,753.
