= Tiémala-Banimonotié =

- Commune
- Location in Mali
- Coordinates: 11.223°N 7.491°W
- Country: Mali
- Region: Sikasso Region
- Cercle: Bougouni Cercle
- Admin HQ (Chef-lieu): Kologo

Population (2009 census)
  - Total: 17,353
- Time zone: UTC+0 (GMT)

Tiémala-Banimonotié is a rural commune in the Cercle of Bougouni in the Sikasso Region of southern Mali. The main village (chef-lieu) is Kologo.
