= Sibirila =

Coordinates: 11°25′38″N 7°46′00″W

- Commune
- Interactive map of Sibirila
- Country: Mali
- Region: Sikasso Region
- Cercle: Bougouni Cercle

Population (1998)
  - Total: 14,012
- Time zone: UTC+0 (GMT)

Sibirila is a commune in the Cercle of Bougouni in the Sikasso Region of southern Mali. The principal town lies at Manankoro. In 1998 the commune had a population of 14,012.
