= Bladié-Tiémala =

Coordinates: 11°53′11″N 7°51′59″W

- Commune and village
- Interactive map of Bladié-Tiémala
- Country: Mali
- Region: Sikasso Region
- Cercle: Bougouni Cercle

Population (2009 census)
  - Total: 4,678
  - Ethnicities: Bambara Fulani
- Time zone: UTC+0 (GMT)

Bladié-Tiémala is a rural commune and village in the Cercle of Bougouni in the Sikasso Region of southern Mali.
