= Meridiela =

Coordinates: 12°05′30″N 7°15′33″W

- Commune and town
- Interactive map of Meridiela
- Country: Mali
- Region: Sikasso Region
- Cercle: Bougouni Cercle

Population (1998)
  - Total: 9,037
- Time zone: UTC+0 (GMT)

Meridiela is a small town and commune in the Cercle of Bougouni in the Sikasso Region of south-western Mali. In 1998 the commune had a population of 9,037.
