= Kola, Mali =

Kola
- Commune and village
- Location in Mali
- Coordinates: 12°15′0″N 7°59′34″W
- Country: Mali
- Region: Sikasso Region
- Cercle: Bougouni Cercle

Population (1998)
  - Total: 2,568
- Time zone: UTC+0 (GMT)

Kola or Kola-Sokoro is a village and commune in the Cercle of Bougouni in the Sikasso Region of southern Mali. In 1998 the commune had a population of 2,568.
