= Debelin =

Coordinates: 11°33′02″N 6°59′10″W

- Commune and town
- Interactive map of Debelin
- Country: Mali
- Region: Sikasso Region
- Cercle: Bougouni Cercle

Population (1998)
  - Total: 4,990
- Time zone: UTC+0 (GMT)

Debelin is a small town and commune in the Cercle of Bougouni in the Sikasso Region of south-western Mali. In 1998 the commune had a population of 4,990.
