= Faragouaran =

Coordinates: 11°19′N 7°46′W

- Commune and town
- Interactive map of Faragouaran
- Country: Mali
- Region: Sikasso Region
- Cercle: Bougouni Cercle

Population (1998)
  - Total: 6,971
- Time zone: UTC+0 (GMT)

Faragouaran is a small town and commune in the Cercle of Bougouni in the Sikasso Region of southern Mali. In 1998 the commune had a population of 6,971.
