= Faradiele =

Coordinates: 11°21′N 7°38′W

- Commune and town
- Interactive map of Faradiele
- Country: Mali
- Region: Sikasso Region
- Cercle: Bougouni Cercle

Population (1998)
  - Total: 2,130
- Time zone: UTC+0 (GMT)

Faradiele is a small town and commune in the Cercle of Bougouni in the Sikasso Region of southern Mali. In 1998 the commune had a population of 2130.
