= Geology of Burkina Faso =

The geology of Burkina Faso is dominated by Precambrian rocks of the Guinea Rise, a dome of Archaean rocks, composed largely of migmatites, gneisses and amphibolites, over which lie the greenstone belts of the early Proterozoic age. The latter are metasediments and metavolcanics assigned largely to the Birimian Supergroup, a suite of rocks in which can also economically significant mineralization occurs. Pre-Birimian migmatites, gneisses, and amphibolites, located under the Birimian rocks, are the oldest rocks in the country. The Birimian deposits in the southwestern part of the country are typically divided between clastic and volcano-clastic formations.

== Economic geology ==
Gold is the most important geological commodity for Burkina Faso's economy, and makes Burkina Faso the eighth largest producer in Africa. Gold extraction increased 250% in 2008. It is produced from the Kalsaka, Mana and Youga mines, among others. Gold is found in the Birimian formations as a result of mineralization, and is also found in river gravels. Other metals mined include manganese, copper, zinc and silver whilst exploration continues for copper and uranium. Limestone, marble, phosphates, pumice and salt are also worked commercially. Alluvial diamonds have been found too. Other than gold, the most significant mineral extraction is of zinc at the Perkoa mine, and manganese at the Tambao mine. Low grade copper deposits have been found in three locations, but none of them are currently being mined. Burkina Faso does not extract any significant amount of petroleum and therefore relies on exports. There is also about 30 Mt of phosphate deposits believed to be in the Pendjari series.
