= Yinindougou =

Coordinates: 11°17′36″N 7°56′47″W

- Commune and town
- Interactive map of Yinindougou
- Country: Mali
- Region: Sikasso Region
- Cercle: Bougouni Cercle

Population (1998)
  - Total: 4,104
- Time zone: UTC+0 (GMT)

Yinindougou is a small town and commune in the Cercle of Bougouni in the Sikasso Region of southern Mali. In 1998 the commune had a population of 4,104. The commune consists of 11 villages.
