= Yiridougou =

Coordinates: 10°53′N 7°09′W

- Commune
- Interactive map of Yiridougou
- Country: Mali
- Region: Sikasso Region
- Cercle: Bougouni Cercle

Population (1998)
  - Total: 5,992
- Time zone: UTC+0 (GMT)

Yiridougou is a commune in the Cercle of Bougouni in the Sikasso Region of southern Mali. The principal town lies at Ouroumpana. In 1998 the commune had a population of 5,992.
