= Zantiébougou =

- Commune and town
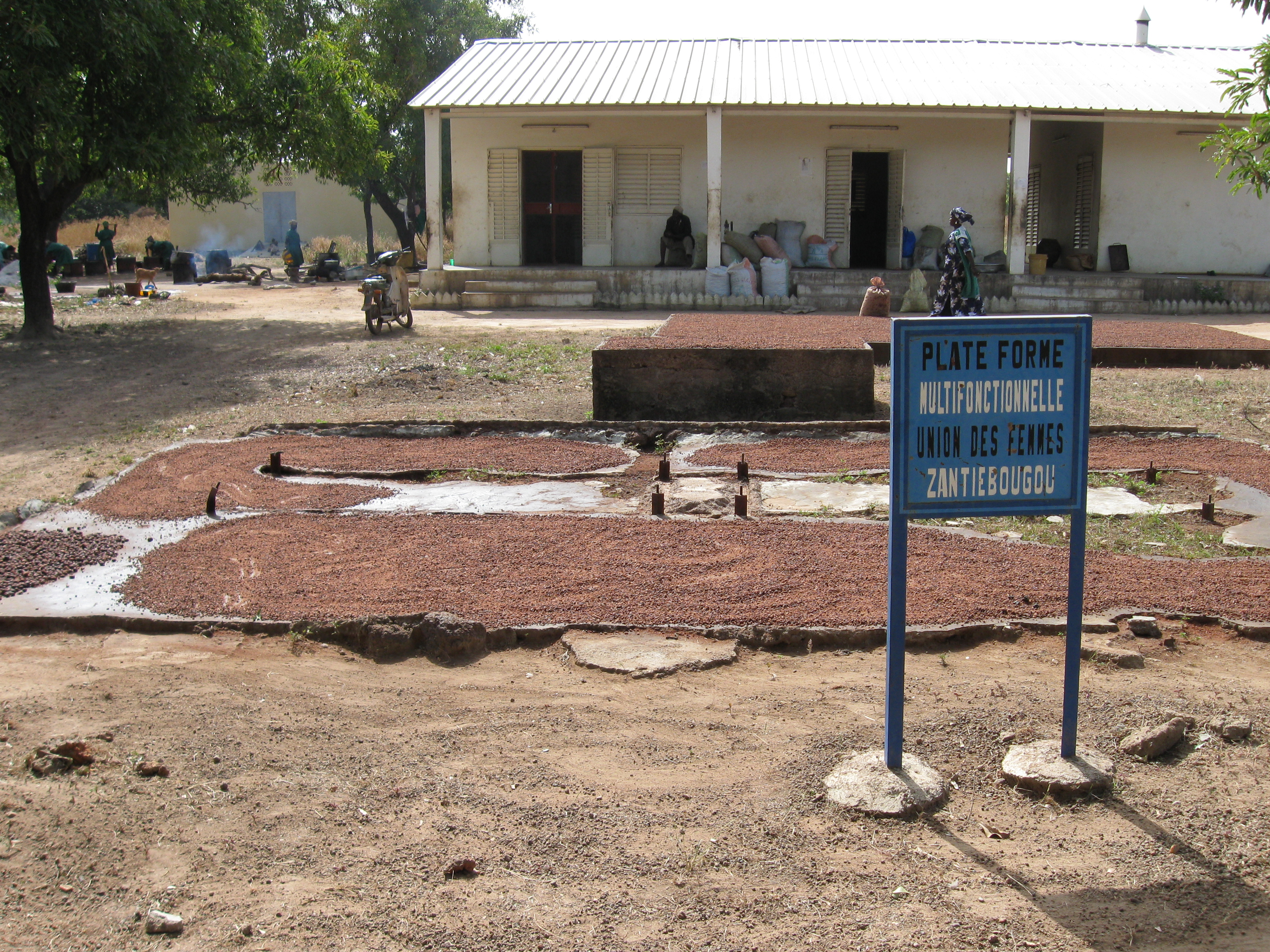

- Location in Mali
- Coordinates: 11°24′N 7°15′W
- Country: Mali
- Region: Sikasso Region
- Cercle: Bougouni Cercle

Population (1998)
  - Total: 21,666
- Time zone: UTC+0 (GMT)

Zantiébougou is a small town and commune in the Cercle of Bougouni in the Sikasso Region of southern Mali. In 1998 the commune had a population of 21,666.
