= Dogo, Sikasso =

Dogo
- Commune and town
- Interactive map of Dogo
- Coordinates: 11.874167°N 7.336389°W
- Country: Mali
- Region: Sikasso Region
- Cercle: Bougouni Cercle

Population (2009)
  - Total: 33,466
- Time zone: UTC+0 (GMT)

Dogo is a small town and commune in the Cercle of Bougouni in the Sikasso Region of southern Mali. As of 2009 the commune had a population of 33,466.
