= Eburnean orogeny =

Mountain building event in what is now West Africa

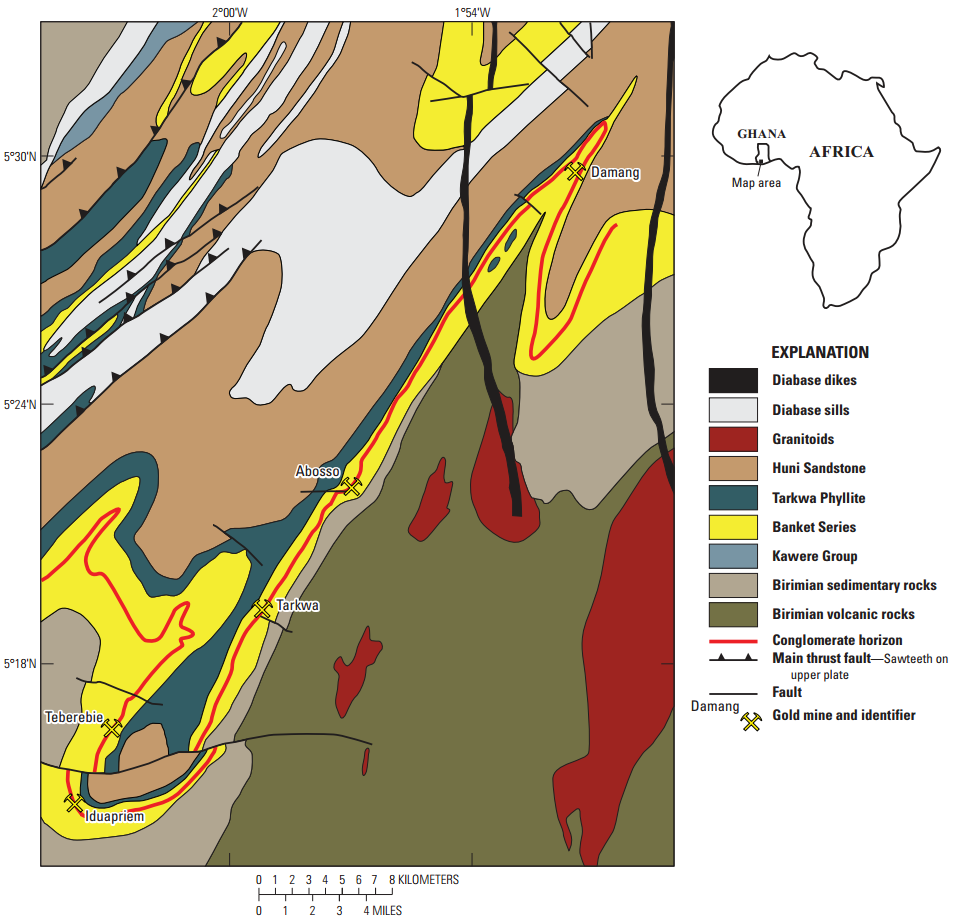
Geological map of the Tarkwa gold district in Ghana showing significant folding and faulting associated with Eburnean metamorphism.

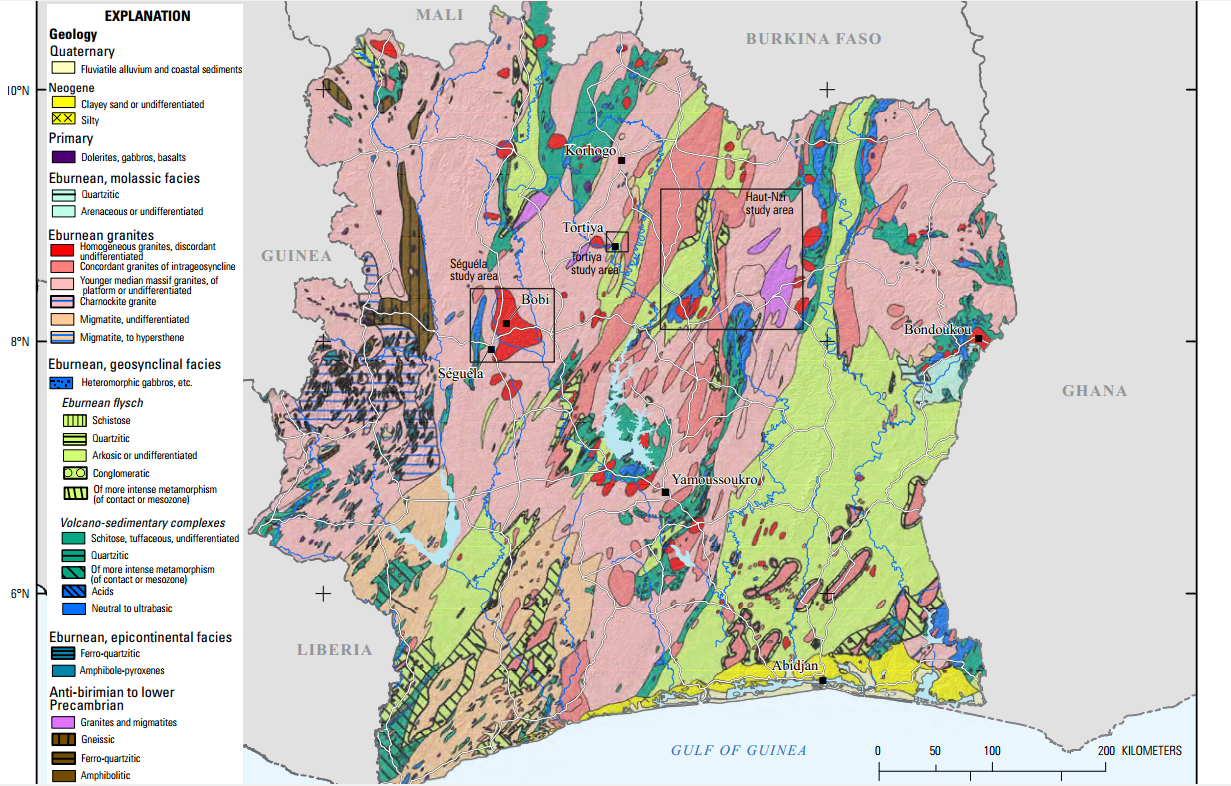
Geological map of Ivory Coast, in which the "Eburnean, geosynclinal facies" is equivalent to the Birimian.

The Eburnean orogeny, or Eburnean cycle, was a series of tectonic, metamorphic and plutonic events in what is now West Africa during the Paleoproterozoic era about 2200–2000 million years ago. During this period the Birimian domain in West Africa was established and structured.

Eburnian faults are found in the Eglab shield to the north of the West African craton and in the Man Shield to the south of the craton. There is evidence of three major Eburnean magmatic events in the Eglab shield. Between 2210 and 2180 Ma, a metamorphosed batholith was formed in the Lower Reguibat Complex (LRC). Around 2090 Ma, a syntectonic trondhjemitic pluton intruded into the Archaean reelects of the Chegga series. Around 2070 Ma an asthenospheric upwelling released a large volume of post-orogenic magmas. Eburnian trends within the Eglab shield were repeatedly reactivated from the Neoproterozoic to the Mesozoic.

== See also ==
- Geology of Ghana
- Geology of Ivory Coast
- Geology of Mali
