= Keleya =

- Commune and town
- Location in Mali
- Coordinates: 11°50′N 7°47′W
- Country: Mali
- Region: Sikasso Region
- Cercle: Bougouni Cercle

Population (1998)
  - Total: 17,267
- Time zone: UTC+0 (GMT)

Keleya is a small town and commune in the Cercle of Bougouni in the Sikasso Region of south-western Mali. In 1998 the commune had a population of 17,267.
