= Kouroulamini =

Coordinates: 11°15′06″N 7°43′45″W

- Commune
- Interactive map of Kouroulamini
- Country: Mali
- Region: Sikasso Region
- Cercle: Bougouni Cercle

Population (1998)
  - Total: 3,128
- Time zone: UTC+0 (GMT)

Kouroulamini is a commune in the Cercle of Bougouni in the Sikasso Region of southern Mali. The principal town lies at N'Tentou. In 1998 the commune had a population of 3,128.
