= Domba, Mali =

Domba
- Commune and town
- Location in Mali
- Coordinates: 12°6′45″N 7°13′28″W
- Country: Mali
- Region: Sikasso Region
- Cercle: Bougouni Cercle

Population (1998)
  - Total: 8,107
- Time zone: UTC+0 (GMT)

Domba is a small town and commune in the Cercle of Bougouni in the Sikasso Region of south-western Mali. In 1998 the commune had a population of 8,107.
