= Taoudeni Basin =

Basin in western Africa

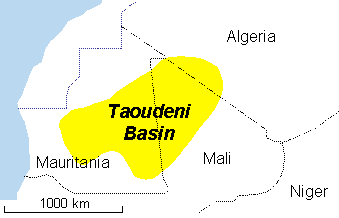
Approximate extent of Taoudeni basin

Major West African sedimentary basins

The Taoudeni Basin is a major Sedimentary basin in West Africa, named after the Taoudenni village in northern Mali. It covers large parts of the West African craton in Mauritania and Mali. It is of considerable interest due to its possible reserves of oil. In addition to its economic importance, the basin contains scientifically important fossils from the Late Mesoproterozoic and Early Neoproterozoic eras, which correspond to a time interval known as the Boring Billion.

== Description ==
The Taoudeni is the largest sedimentary basin in Northwest Africa, formed during the Middle to Late Proterozoic. It continued to subside until the Middle Paleozoic, when Hercynian deformation and uplift occurred. It contains up to 6,000 metres (20,000 ft) of Late Precambrian and Paleozoic sediments. Exploratory drilling since the 1980s has found indications of petroleum in the Late Precambrian, Silurian and Late Devonian formations.

Sediments are thicker in the western half of the basin.

Biogeochemists at the Australian National University found pigments in 1.1 billion year old marine shale from the Taoudeni Basin in Mauritania. They interpret this as fossil chlorophyll from cyanobacteria, and hypothesize that the bacteria were rapidly buried and protected from oxygen. The fossilized chlorophyll was discovered in shale samples from a mining operation.

== Petroleum geology ==
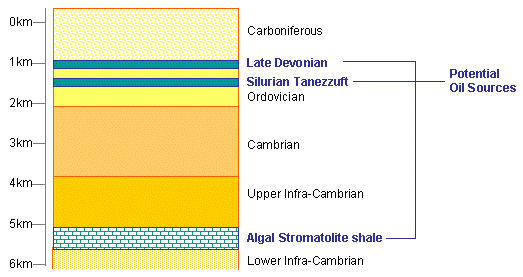
Possible cross-section of central Taoudeni Basin

The government of Mali, one of the poorest countries in the world, is eager to create an oil industry. Companies that have been exploring in the area include Baraka Petroleum, Sonatrach, Eni, Total S.A., Woodside and CNPC. However, the remote location and harsh environment of the Sahara Desert make extraction expensive.

== Natural hydrogen ==
In 1987 in the village of Bourakébougou in the Koulikoro Region of Mali, natural hydrogen gas was discovered seeping out of a well. A local petroleum company, Petroma Inc., was created in 2006. Working with international partners, it began producing electricity from the hydrogen in 2012. Since then, the well has produced enough hydrogen to provide electricity for the whole village. The company, renamed Hydroma in 2019, has been exploring the possibilities of exporting the natural hydrogen to Germany.
