= Mining industry of Ivory Coast =

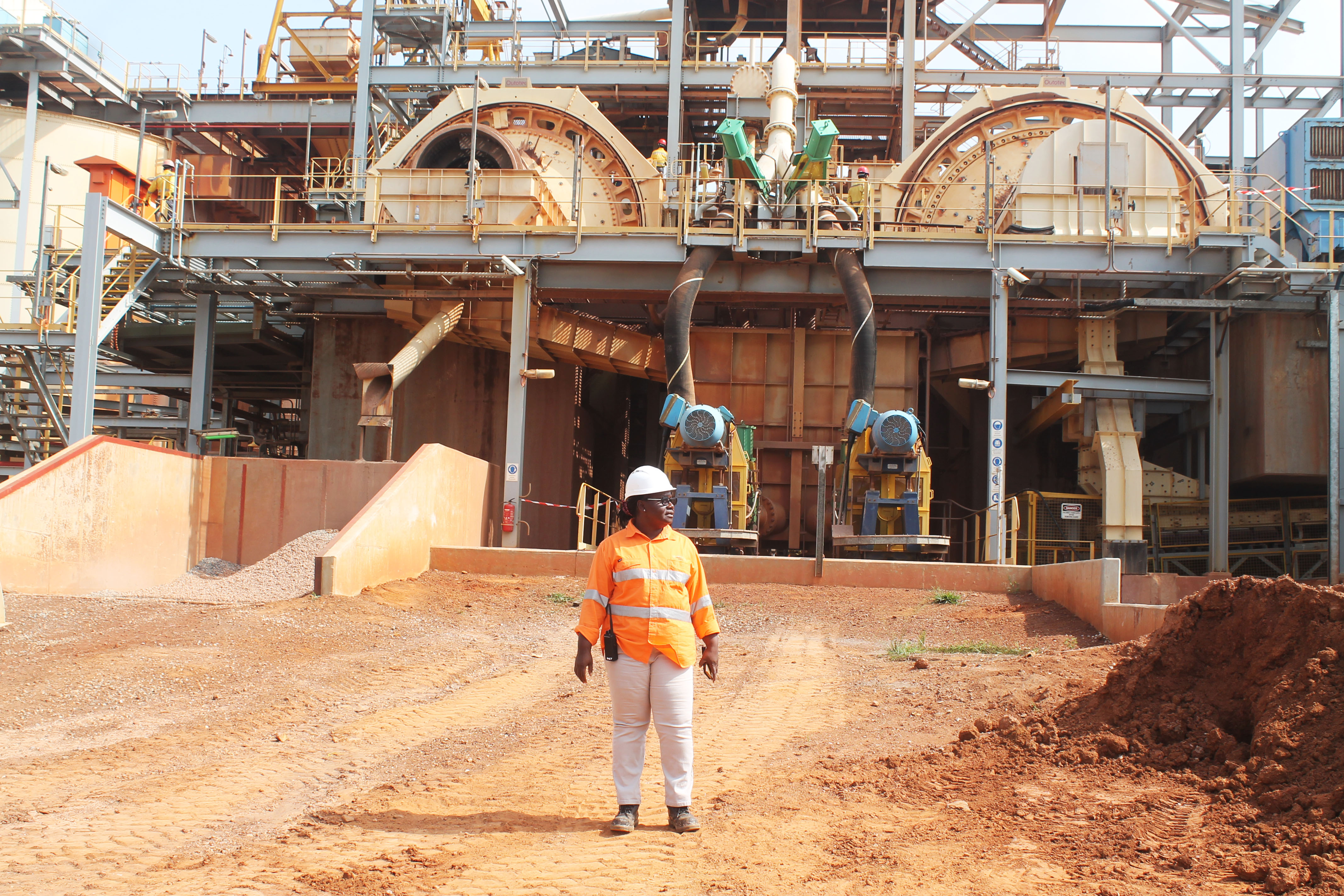

The mining sector of Ivory Coast contributes to 13% of the country's exports annually and accounts for 5% of the GDP. The industry has historically centered on the extraction of gold. Although the subsoil of Ivory Coast contains many other minerals, none had been discovered in commercially exploitable amounts.

During the precolonial era, gold was extracted from small shafts dug into the earth or from river and stream beds and was traded at the coast or across the Sahara Desert. Efforts under the colonial administration to exploit gold deposits at Kokoumbo in the center of the country and at small mines in the southeast proved unprofitable. In 1984 the state-owned SODEMI and a French mining company formed the Ity Mining Company (Société Minières d'Ity—SMI) to exploit a deposit discovered thirty years earlier at Ity near Danané. Total investment in this period was estimated at CFA F1.2 billion. The gold ore was of medium quality, with a ratio of gold to ore in the range of 8.5 grams per ton. Extraction was begun in 1987, with an output anticipated at 700 kilograms of gold metal during the first two years of operation. Ity estimated an additional investment of CFA F2.3 billion to expand output to 700 kilograms of gold metal a year. SODEMI also located gold deposits in the region of Issia and in the Lobo River bed, with anticipated annual yields of 100 kilograms and 25 kilograms, respectively.

In the mid-1970s, low-grade deposits (less than 50 percent) of iron ore estimated at 585 million tons were assayed at Bangolo near the Liberian border. A consortium representing Japanese, French, British, American, Dutch, and Ivoirian interests was formed to exploit the deposits; however, depressed world prices for iron ore forced the participants to postpone the project indefinitely.

Following World War II, diamond mining seemed promising, but by the mid-1980s expectations had waned. The Tortiya diamond mine, operating since 1948, peaked in 1972 when 260,000 carats (52 kg) were mined. In 1980, however, the mine was closed. The Bobi mine near Séguéla produced 270,000 carats (54 kg) per year until the late 1970s; it was closed in 1979. Remaining reserves for Tortiya were estimated at 450,000 carats (90 kg); for Bobi, 150,000 carats (30 kg).

Between 1960 and 1966, manganese mines in the region of Grand-Lahou on the coast yielded 180,000 tons of ore per year. In 1970, after world market prices had dropped and production costs had risen, the mines were closed. There were additional unexploited manganese deposits near Odienné. Ivory Coast also had small deposits of colombo-tantalite, ilmenite, cobalt, copper, nickel, and bauxite.

As part of the Ivorian government’s strategic action plan to diversify the country's economic output, mining activities over the last decade have been steadily increasing. In September 2021, a large oil deposit was discovered in the Ivory Coast. This was followed by two more discoveries in July 2022 and February 2024. These discoveries are leading the country to explore its potential as an oil and gas producer. The number of mining permits and projects has tripled since 2012, from nine to 28. Research permits have also increased from 120 to nearly 200 over the same period. Tax revenue from mining activity had increased 20 times since 2012, standing at 372 billion CFA francs ($620 million) in 2023.

Ivory Coast's gold output hit a record high in 2023 at 51 metric tons, up 6% from 48 tons in 2022. It is expected to hit 56 metric tons in 2024. The expansion of gold exports has been driven by the discovery of new gold deposits and the opening of new mines. In May 2024, the country's largest deposit of gold was discovered in the west, with the potential to be the third-largest gold deposit in West Africa. The government aims to make mining the second largest driver of growth in the Ivorian economy, after agriculture, with a target of 8% of the GDP by 2030.
