= Garalo =

- Commune and town
- Location in Mali
- Coordinates: 10.990°N 7.437°W
- Country: Mali
- Region: Sikasso Region
- Cercle: Bougouni Cercle
- Admin HQ (Chef-lieu): Garalo

Area
  - Total: 673 km^{2} (260 sq mi)

Population (2009 census)
  - Total: 38,900
  - Density: 57.8/km^{2} (150/sq mi)
- Time zone: UTC+0 (GMT)

Garalo is a small town and rural commune in the Cercle of Bougouni in the Sikasso Region of southern Mali.

The commune contains 30 settlements:

- Banko
- Dialakoro
- Djine
- Fara
- Farabale Zena
- Foulalaba
- Garalo
- Golobala
- Kerekoumana
- Kodiougou
- Kotie
- Koura
- N'Gouako
- Nagnola
- Ngouana
- Ouenasokoro
- Paniala
- Sena
- Sienre
- Sienrou
- Sirakole
- Sirankourou
- Sirantjila
- Sola Bougouda
- Solaba
- Soronakolobe
- Tabakorole
- Tanhala
- Tiekoumala
- Tienko
