= Koumantou =

- Commune and town
- Location in Mali
- Coordinates: 11°24′N 7°15′W
- Country: Mali
- Region: Sikasso Region
- Cercle: Bougouni Cercle

Population (2009)
  - Total: 51,348
- Time zone: UTC+0 (GMT)

Koumantou is a commune and town in Mali, in the Cercle of Bougouni in the Sikasso Region. It is located near the Ivorian border.

The commune includes 38 villages spread over 1268 km^{2}. As of 2009 the commune had a population of 51,348. The commune's economy is heavily agricultural, relying particularly on millet, corn, sorghum, peanuts, and cotton. The Compagnie malienne pour le développement du textile (CMDT) has a cotton-processing factory located in the town.

A festival of music and traditional danse, organized by the Association for the Development of the Commune of Koumantou (ADAKOM), was held from 19 to 22 May 2005, in the villages of Koumantou, Niamala, and Kôla. The festival celebrated such traditional instruments as the buru, mpolon, and balafon.

== See also ==
- List of cities in Mali
