= Sido, Mali =

Coordinates: 11°39′55″N 7°35′59″W

Sido
- Commune and town
- Interactive map of Sido
- Country: Mali
- Region: Sikasso Region
- Cercle: Bougouni Cercle

Population (1998)
  - Total: 13,877
- Time zone: UTC+0 (GMT)

Sido is a commune in the Bougouni Cercle of southern Mali's Sikasso Region. In 1998, it had a population of 13,877.
