= Man Shield =

localization in western Africa

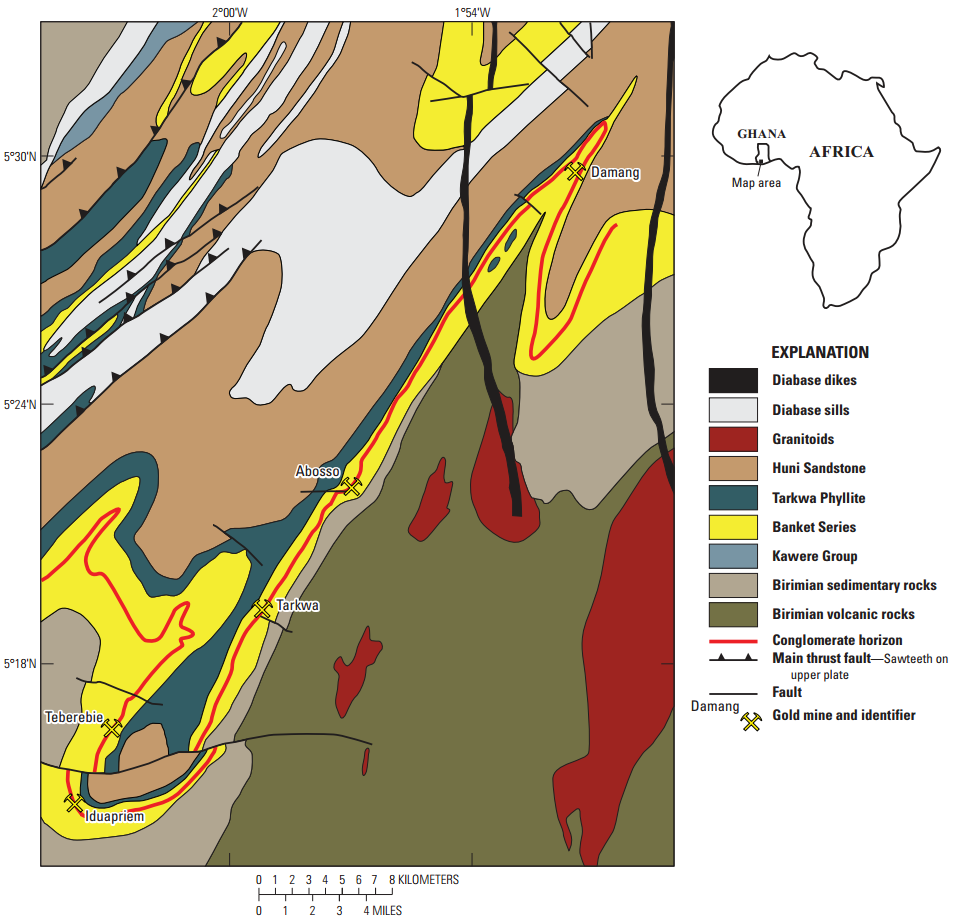
Geological map of the Tarkwa gold district in Ghana showing significant folding and faulting

The Man Shield (Leo-Man Shield or Leo-Man Craton) is a geological shield or craton in the southern portion of the West African Craton. The shield is in part overlaid by gold-bearing Birimian formations.

== Geography and Geology ==
The shield covers the countries Ivory Coast, Mali, Burkina Faso, Ghana, Sierra Leone, Liberia, and Guinea. this shield, a large portion of the WAC consists of Paleoproterozoic Birimian continent margins.

The Birimian units were initially produced in an immature volcanic arc setting, which was later metamorphosed during the Eburnean orogeny. The poor exposure of the greenstone belt in the area limits interpretations of a broad structural context. The limited greenstone belt exposure indicates a major deformation event associated with granitoid intrusions. The shield hosts world-class gold deposits, important iron ore concentrations, and the mineralization of aluminum ore, lead-zinc, manganese, phosphate, and uranium. A majority of the gold deposit formations occurred during the Eburnean orogeny, but a number of the remaining gold deposits formed before this orogeny during a period of oceanic arc-back-arc basin formation and erosion during the Neoproterozoic and Cretaceous.

== See also ==
- Geology of Ghana
