= West African Craton =

One of the five Precambrian cratons that make up the African Plate

The geological eons and eras of the West African Craton
Scale: millions of years

The West African Craton (WAC) is one of the five cratons of the Precambrian basement rock of Africa that make up the African Plate, the others being the Kalahari craton, Congo craton, Saharan Metacraton and Tanzania Craton. Cratons themselves are tectonically inactive, but can occur near active margins, with the WAC extending across 14 countries in Western Africa, coming together in the late Precambrian and early Palaeozoic eras to form the African continent. It consists of two Archean centers juxtaposed against multiple Paleoproterozoic domains made of greenstone belts, sedimentary basins, regional granitoid-tonalite-trondhjemite-granodiorite (TTG) plutons, and large shear zones. The craton is overlain by Neoproterozoic and younger sedimentary basins. The boundaries of the WAC are predominantly defined by a combination of geophysics and surface geology, with additional constraints by the geochemistry of the region. At one time, volcanic action around the rim of the craton may have contributed to a major global warming event.

== Location and geology ==
West Africa

The craton appears to have formed when three Archean cratons fused: Leo-Man-Ghana, Taoudeni and Reguibat.
The first two docked around 2.1 Ga (billion years ago), and the Reguibat Craton docked with the craton around 2 Ga. The roots of the combined craton extend to a depth of over 300 km (190 mi) in the subcontinental lithospheric mantle. The WAC stretches from the Little Atlas mountains of Morocco to the Gulf of Guinea, and is bounded by mobile belts of much younger rocks to the north, east and west. The oldest rocks were metamorphosed 2.9 to 2.5 billion years ago. In the Sahara it is mostly covered by more recent sediments from the Phanerozoic Eon. Further south, younger volcanic and sedimentary rocks outcrop in Ghana, Ivory Coast, and Sierra Leone, surrounded by even younger sediments laid down in the Precambrian.

The WAC is made of two distinct regions north and south of each other; the Reguibat shield and the Man shield respectively. Both of these regions are mainly made of rocks that are either Archean or Paleoproterozoic in age, with western Archean nuclei, and rock types are separated by major shear zones. The fold belts surrounding the WAC were folded and metamorphosed during the Pan-African and/or the Variscan orogenies.

The WAC underlies the modern countries of Morocco, Algeria, Mauritania, Senegal, The Gambia, Guinea Bissau, Guinea, Mali, Burkina Faso, Sierra Leone, Liberia, Ivory Coast, Ghana, Togo and Benin.

=== Metamorphism and evolution ===
The metamorphic record of the craton is characteristic of Paleoproterozoic plate tectonics. A definitive evolution of the area has not been determined as a result of conflicting interpretation of the relationship between low-grade greenstone belts and high-grade gneissic terranes dominated by TTG suites. The three major, widely accepted tectonothermal events for the WAC; the 3.5 to 2.9 Ga Pre-Leonean and Leonean Orogeny, the 2.9 to 2.8 Ga Liberian Orogeny, and the 2.15-1.8 Ga Eburnean Orogeny. A definitive answer has strong implications on the geodynamic processes controlling the craton stabilization and maturation after the Archean-Proterozoic transition. Limited geochronological data indicate a prolonged period of metamorphic overprint, lasting approximately 70-million-years, with the support of Sm-Nd garnet-whole-rock isochron age data and U-Pb and Pb-Pb crystallization ages of zircon, monazite, and titanite.

Overprinting relationships in the area indicate copper mineralization is associated with the first deformation event in the WAC, with gold mineralization occurring during subsequent deformation events via reactivation of magmatic and hydrothermal fluids.

==== Constraints ====
The metamorphic rock of the WAC include, but are not limited to, high-grade amphibolite facies amphibolite, gneiss, paragneiss schist, calc-silicate rock, and migmatites. Portions of the region have also been metamorphosed to the greenschist facies, generally termed a greenstone belt in an Archean terrane. The timing of the facies is constrained by the in-situ U-Pb dating, with garnet composition providing constraints for prograde evolution at the blueschist-amphibolite facies transition. The tectonic environment is constrained by a combination of geophysics, surface geology, geochemistry, and metallogenesis.

== Wanderings ==
Approximate location of Mesoproterozoic (older than 1.3 Ga) cratons in South America and Africa (the Saharan Metacraton is not shown).

The Earth formed about 4.54 billion years ago. As it cooled, the lithosphere, consisting of the crust and the rigid uppermost part of the mantle, solidified. The lithosphere rides on the asthenosphere, which is also solid but can flow like a liquid on geological time scales. The lithosphere is broken up into tectonic plates, which slowly move in relation to one another at speeds of 50–100 mm annually, colliding, combining into continents, splitting and drifting apart to form new continental configurations.

It is difficult to reconstruct the early wanderings of the West African Craton, but around 1.13–1.071 billion years ago it seems to have been one of the cratons that came together to form Rodinia, a supercontinent. At that time, the Congo Craton lay to the west of the Amazonian Craton, and the West African Craton lay to the south where both were rotated about 180° and retain this relative configuration.

Around 750 million years ago Rodinia rifted apart into three continents: Proto-Laurasia, the Congo craton and Proto-Gondwana. The West African Craton may then have combined with other cratons to form Pannotia, a hypothetical supercontinent that existed from the Pan-African orogeny about 600 million years ago to the end of the Precambrian about 539 million years ago. Later it became part of Gondwana, and later still part of Pangaea, the supercontinent that existed during the Paleozoic and Mesozoic eras about between 335 and 175 million years ago, before North and South America separated from Eurasia and Africa and the continents started to drift towards current configurations.

== Snowball Earth ==
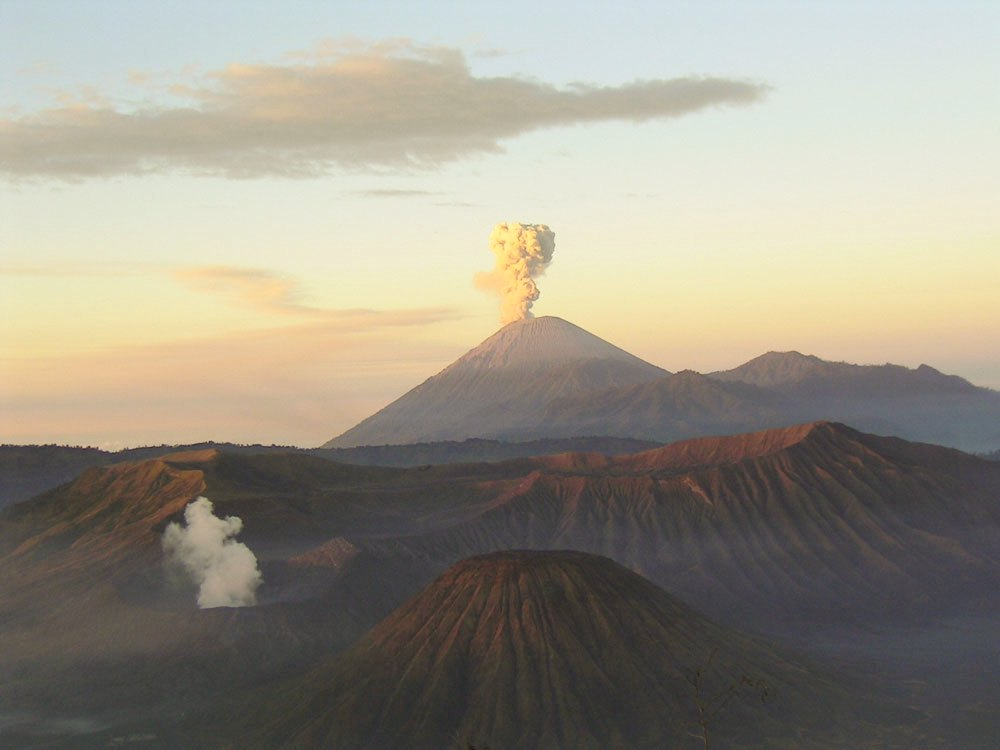
Volcanoes may have had a role in ending the global ice age of Snowball Earth.

Proponents of the Snowball Earth theory claim that sometime before 650 million years ago the Earth was going through an extremely cold period. The oceans were frozen to great depths, and snow covering reflected the heat from the sun through cloudless skies. Only simple forms of life could survive in locations such as deep oceanic hydrothermal vents. At the end of this period the edges of the West African craton became highly active, throwing up a ring of volcanoes. The thermal activity was caused by excessive mantle heat that had built up below the craton, insulated by the lithosphere. The volcanic eruptions created a greenhouse effect on massive scale, melting the ice and releasing CO_{2} into the atmosphere. The climate quickly switched to one much warmer than today, resulting in the Cambrian explosion of life forms.

== Features ==
During its wanderings, at different times covered by ice sheets, forests, marshes or arid desert, the surface of the West African Craton has been heavily eroded by ice, water and wind. In most places the original rocks are buried far below more recent volcanic and sedimentary deposits. The visible features are usually of comparatively recent origin.

=== Little Atlas Range and Atlas Mountains ===
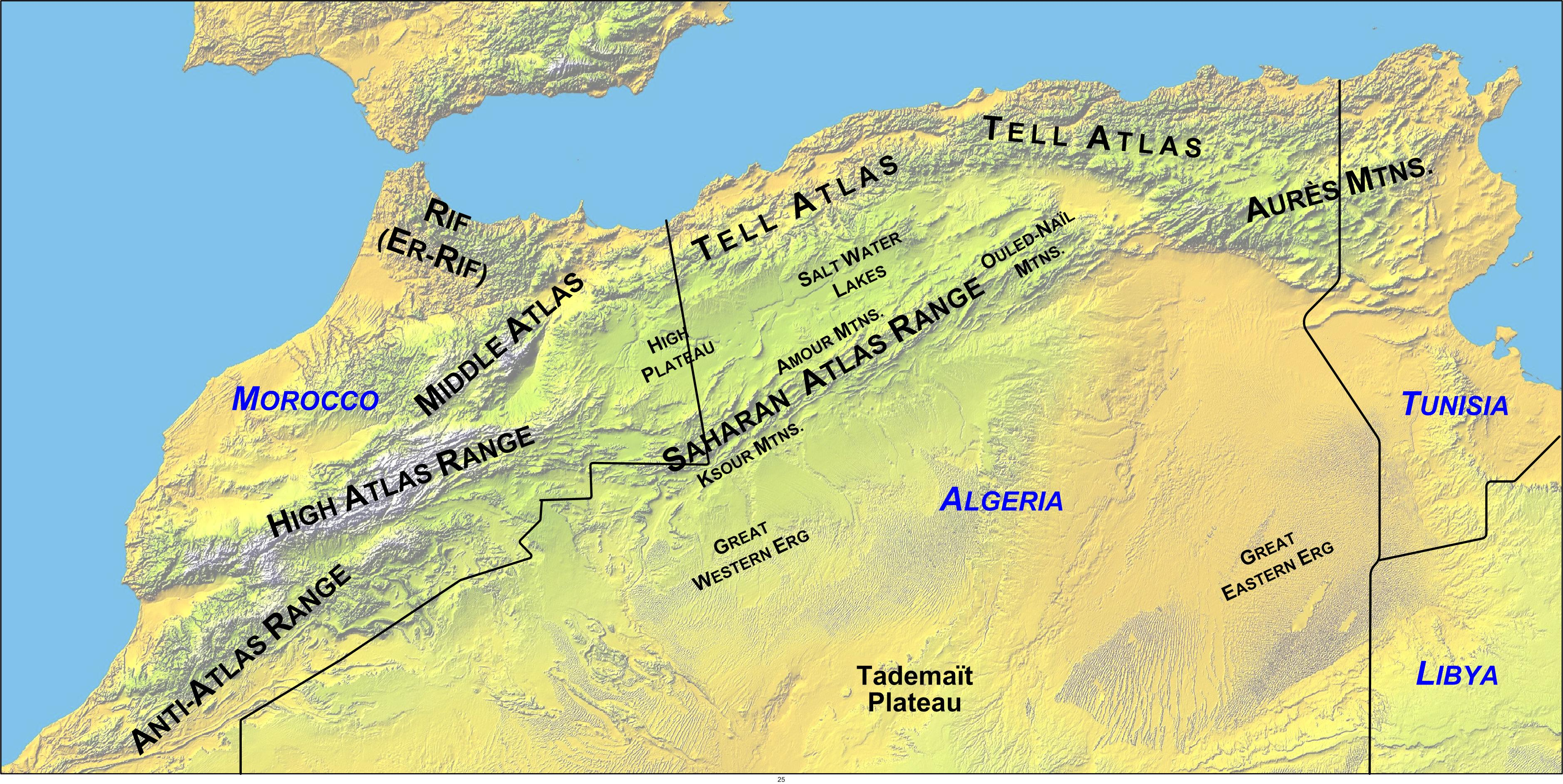
Atlas Mountains in North Africa.

The Little Atlas range formed about 300 million years ago when Euramerica and Gondwana ground against one another during the Alleghenian orogeny, a process that also formed the Appalachians in present-day North America. More recently, in the Cenozoic Era from 66 million to about 1.8 million years ago, the mountain chains that today compose the Atlas Mountains were lifted up as the European and African plates collided at the southern end of the Iberian Peninsula. Erosion has reduced the Little Atlas range so that it is today lower than the High Atlas range to the north.

=== Saharan Basins ===
South of the mountains, the West African Craton is relatively flat, mostly desert or dry savanna apart from the areas near the Atlantic or Gulf of Guinea. However, below the surface there are ancient sedimentary basins such as the Taoudeni basin that may contain large reserves of oil and gas.

=== Reguibat Shield ===
The northern Reguibat shield covers parts of Algeria, Western Sahara, Morocco and Mauritania. It contains exposed Paleoproterozoic units to the east, and Archean to the west, including kimberlites making it a primary diamond source with gold and copper deposits occurring in a sub-domain of the shield (Paleoproterozoic Yetti). It experienced at least one major cooling event during the Mesozoic and three minor cooling events from the late Cretaceous to present day. Low temperature thermochronology data indicates that the western side of the shield has an igneous differentiation post-Triassic thermal history, largely controlled by vertical movements of the crust via burial and exhumation processes.

=== Man Shield ===
The southern Man shield covers the countries Ivory Coast, Mali, Burkina Faso, Ghana, Sierra Leone, Liberia, and Guinea. In this shield, a large portion of the WAC consists of Paleoproterozoic Birimian continent. The Birimian units were initially produced in an immature volcanic arc setting, which was later metamorphosed during the Eburnean orogeny. The poor exposure of the greenstone belt in the area limits interpretations of a broad structural context. The limited greenstone belt exposure indicates a major deformation event associated with granitoid intrusions.

The shield hosts world-class gold deposits, important iron ore concentrations, and the mineralization of aluminum ore, lead-zinc, manganese, phosphate, and uranium. A majority of the gold deposit formations occurred during the Eburnean orogeny, but a number of the remaining gold deposits formed before this orogeny during a period of oceanic arc-back-arc basin formation and erosion during the Neoproterozoic and Cretaceous.

== Mining activity ==
Within the West African Craton, there is a large amount of mining activity covering resources such as gold, copper, cobalt, silver, tin, and zinc.

Artisanal mining activity in the craton dates back to the early 1960s which used quartz vein debris as a gold indicator. Placer gold is primarily exploited by the artisanal miners, with other deposit types being mined by open-pit or by excavation mining (surface mining or sub-surface mining). In 1985 the State of Burkina Faso created an official structure, known as Le Projet Orpaillage, for the management of gold mining and buying in the region. Metallurgical studies on the gold panning rejects were funded by the United Nations Development Programme (UNDP) and the Bureau de Recherches Géologiques et Minières (BUMIGEB). The treatment of mine tailings collected from artisanal working gold was the principle operation conducted by the Compagnie d'Exploitation des Mines d'Or du Burkina (CEMOB), operating a heap leach plant which processed approximately 500 tonnes of gold panning rejects per day.

=== Mining in Sierra Leone ===
Following the Mineral Act, organized mining began in 1927 with significant mineral discovery in the 1930s and 40s resulting in medium to moderately sized mines; iron ore, two extensive alluvial gold field deposits, placer gold, alluvial diamonds, and chromite deposits. Quarrying and mining provides a livelihood for greater than 250 thousand people in Sierra Leone alone, employing approximately 15% of its population, producing a significant amount of material to qualify as a resource-rich country. The mining of the WAC can establish a strong economy and government development support, helping the alleviation of poverty.

== See also ==
- Geology of Ghana
