= Bougouni =

- Commune and city
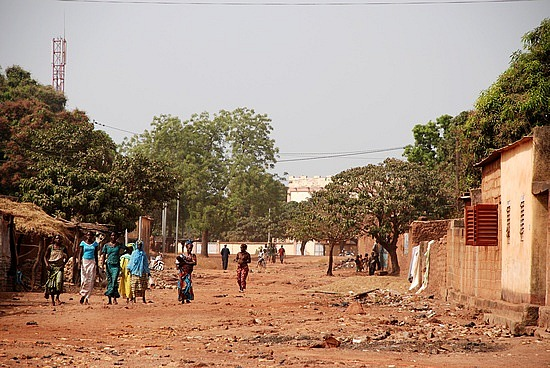
- Bougouni, near the bus station

- Location within Mali
- Coordinates: 11°25′0″N 7°29′0″W
- Country: Mali
- Region: Bougouni
- Cercle: Bougouni Cercle

Area
  - Total: 7 km^{2} (2.7 sq mi)
- Elevation: 344 m (1,129 ft)

Population (2009)
  - Total: 59,679
- Time zone: UTC+0 (GMT)

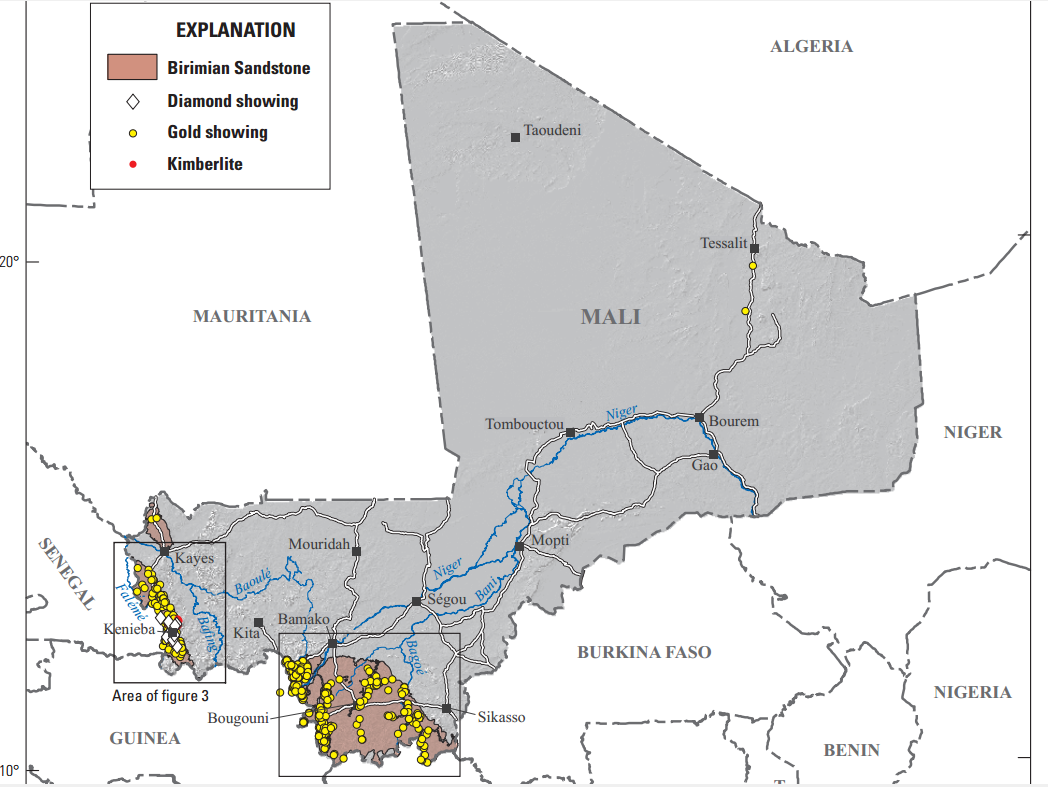
Geological map of Birimian outcrops in Mali, at Bougouni and Kenieba

Bougouni is a commune and city in Mali, the administrative center of Bougouni Cercle and the Bougouni Region. Bougouni is located 170 km south of Bamako and 210 km west of the city of Sikasso. It covers an area of 7 square kilometres (2.7 square miles) and as at the 2009 Census the commune had a population of 59,679, mostly Fulas (Fula: Fulɓe; French: Peuls) and Bambaras (Bambara: Bamananw).

== History ==
Bougouni was established as a quarantine area for surrounding villages, but gradually developed independently. The name means 'small house' in Bambara.

Bougouni was the fourteenth commune created by the French colonial authorities of French Sudan. On July 10, 1894, Bougouni became the administrative center of the commune under its first administrator, Lieutenant Gouraud. Bougouni held an important set of colonial archives which were lost in a fire during the March 1991 uprising against President Moussa Traoré.

== Geography ==
Bougouni, like many cities of Mali, enjoys sufficient rainfall for regular farming. Cotton is produced in the region around the town, making it a center for processing and transport. The Bougouni-Foulaboula Protected Forest (Forêt Classée de Bougouni-Foulaboula) begins just to the southwest of the town.

Bougouni has been a sister city of Aurillac, France, since 1985.

The Cercle of Bougouni includes the communes of Bladié-Tiemela, Bougouni, Chantoula, Danou, Debelin, Defina, Dogo, Domba, Faradielé, Faragouaran, Garolo, Keleya, Kokelé, Kola, Koumantou, Kouroulamini, Meridiela, Ouroun, Sanso, Sibirila, Sido, Tiémala-Banimonotié, Wola, Yinindougou, Yiridougou and Zantiebougou, for a total population of 251,987.

== Climate ==
Bougouni has a tropical savanna climate (Köppen climate classification: Aw).

Climate data for Bougouni (1991-2020)
Month	Jan	Feb	Mar	Apr	May	Jun	Jul	Aug	Sep	Oct	Nov	Dec	Year
Mean daily maximum °C (°F)	34.2 (93.6)	37.1 (98.8)	39.0 (102.2)	38.9 (102.0)	37.0 (98.6)	34.0 (93.2)	31.4 (88.5)	31.0 (87.8)	31.6 (88.9)	33.7 (92.7)	35.5 (95.9)	34.5 (94.1)	34.8 (94.7)
Daily mean °C (°F)	25.6 (78.1)	28.6 (83.5)	31.3 (88.3)	32.2 (90.0)	30.9 (87.6)	28.6 (83.5)	26.8 (80.2)	26.4 (79.5)	26.8 (80.2)	27.9 (82.2)	27.4 (81.3)	25.5 (77.9)	28.2 (82.8)
Mean daily minimum °C (°F)	17.1 (62.8)	20.0 (68.0)	23.5 (74.3)	25.5 (77.9)	24.8 (76.6)	23.2 (73.8)	22.2 (72.0)	22.1 (71.8)	21.9 (71.4)	22.1 (71.8)	19.1 (66.4)	16.5 (61.7)	21.5 (70.7)
Average precipitation mm (inches)	1.5 (0.06)	1.2 (0.05)	7.2 (0.28)	36.0 (1.42)	103.5 (4.07)	160.0 (6.30)	263.9 (10.39)	292.7 (11.52)	221.2 (8.71)	73.8 (2.91)	5.3 (0.21)	0.0 (0.0)	1,166.3 (45.92)
Average precipitation days (≥ 1.0 mm)	0.4	0.5	1.4	4.5	9.3	12.7	17.6	20.1	17.7	8.8	0.9	0.0	93.9
Mean daily sunshine hours	8.8	8.7	8.1	7.8	8.1	7.9	6.8	6.3	7.1	8.1	8.6	8.4	7.9
Source 1: NOAA
Source 2: Deutscher Wetterdienst (daily sun)

== See also ==
- List of cities in Mali
- Mali Empire
