= Bougouni Cercle =

Coordinates: 11.416°N 7.597°W

- Cercle
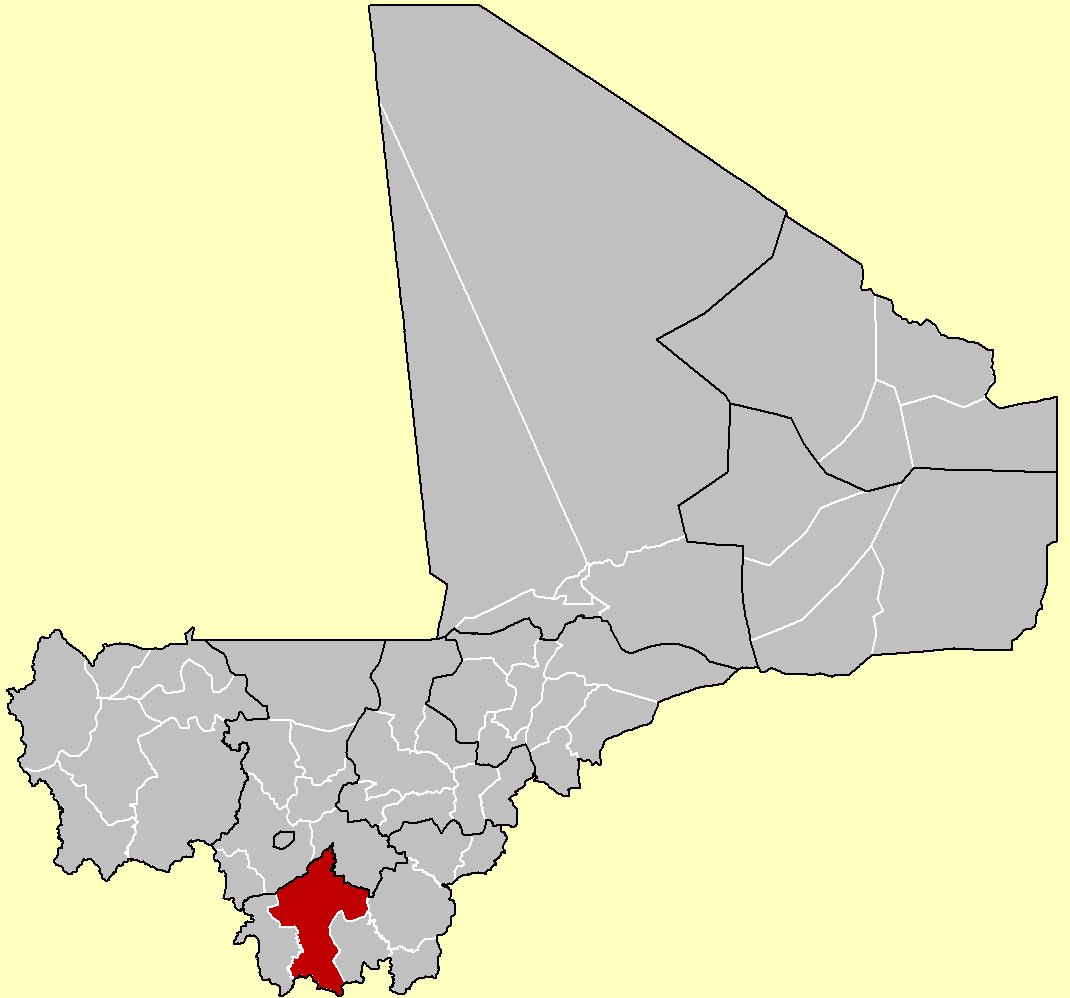
- Location of the Cercle of Bongouni in Mali
- Country: Mali
- Region: Sikasso Region
- Capital: Bougouni
- Admin HQ (Chef-lieu): Bougouni

Area
  - Total: 20,028 km^{2} (7,733 sq mi)

Population (2009 census)
  - Total: 459,509
  - Density: 22.943/km^{2} (59.423/sq mi)
- Time zone: UTC+0 (GMT)

Bougouni Cercle is an administrative subdivision of the Sikasso Region of Mali. The administrative center (chef-lieu) is the town of Bougouni.

The cercle is divided into 26 communes:

Name	Population 1998	Population 2009	Average Annual Change
Bladié-Tiémala	2,025	4,678	7.9
Bougouni	37,260	59,679	4.3
Danou	10,058	11,620	1.3
Débélin	5,135	8,035	4.2
Défina	7,163	3,368	-6.6
Dogo	25,567	33,466	2.5
Domba	8,947	14,085	4.2
Faradiélé	2,220	2,640	1.6
Faragouaran	7,960	12,245	4.0
Garalo	20,394	38,900	6.0
Keleya	17,566	22,392	2.2
Kokélé	5,049	5,368	0.6
Kola	2,724	3,508	2.3
Koumantou	33,987	51,248	3.8
Kouroulamini	4,599	5,686	1.9
Méridiéla	9,137	14,836	4.5
Ouroun	4,265	4,346	0.2
Sanso	10,940	22,284	6.7
Sibirila	17,317	30,828	5.4
Sido	12,921	21,982	4.9
Syen Toula	6,768	8,797	2.4
Tiémala-Banimonotié	11,517	17,353	3.8
Wola	9,257	8,948	-0.3
Yinindougou	4,470	9,225	6.8
Yiridougou	6,860	7,742	1.1
Zantiébougou	23,427	36,150	4.0
