= Kafana, Mali =

Kafana
- Town
- Location in Mali
- Coordinates: 11°31′0″N 6°8′12″W
- Country: Mali
- Region: Sikasso Region
- Cercle: Sikasso Cercle
- Commune: Kofan
- Time zone: UTC+0 (GMT)

Kafana is a small town and seat of the commune of Kofan in the Cercle of Sikasso in the Sikasso Region of southern Mali.
