= Doumanani =

- Village
- Location in Mali
- Coordinates: 11°40′30″N 6°10′0″W
- Country: Mali
- Region: Sikasso Region
- Cercle: Sikasso Cercle
- Commune: Miria
- Time zone: UTC+0 (GMT)
  - Summer (DST): UTC11 40 30 -6 10 0

Doumanani is a village and seat of the commune of Miria in the Cercle of Sikasso in the Sikasso Region of southern Mali. The village is 68 km northwest of Sikasso.
