= Ngana, Mali =

Ngana Ŋaana
- Ngana (Mali)
- Coordinates: 11°54′0″N 6°03′00″W
- Country: Mali
- Region: Sikasso Region
- Cercle: Sikasso Cercle

Area
  - Urban: 1.00 km^{2} (0.39 sq mi)
- Elevation: 348 m (1,142 ft)

Population (2009 Census)
  - City: 2,596
- Time zone: UTC+0

Ngana (Ŋaana) is a small town in the arrondissement of Kignan, cercle and region of Sikasso, Republic of Mali.
