= N'Kourala =

N'Kourala Kourala
- Village
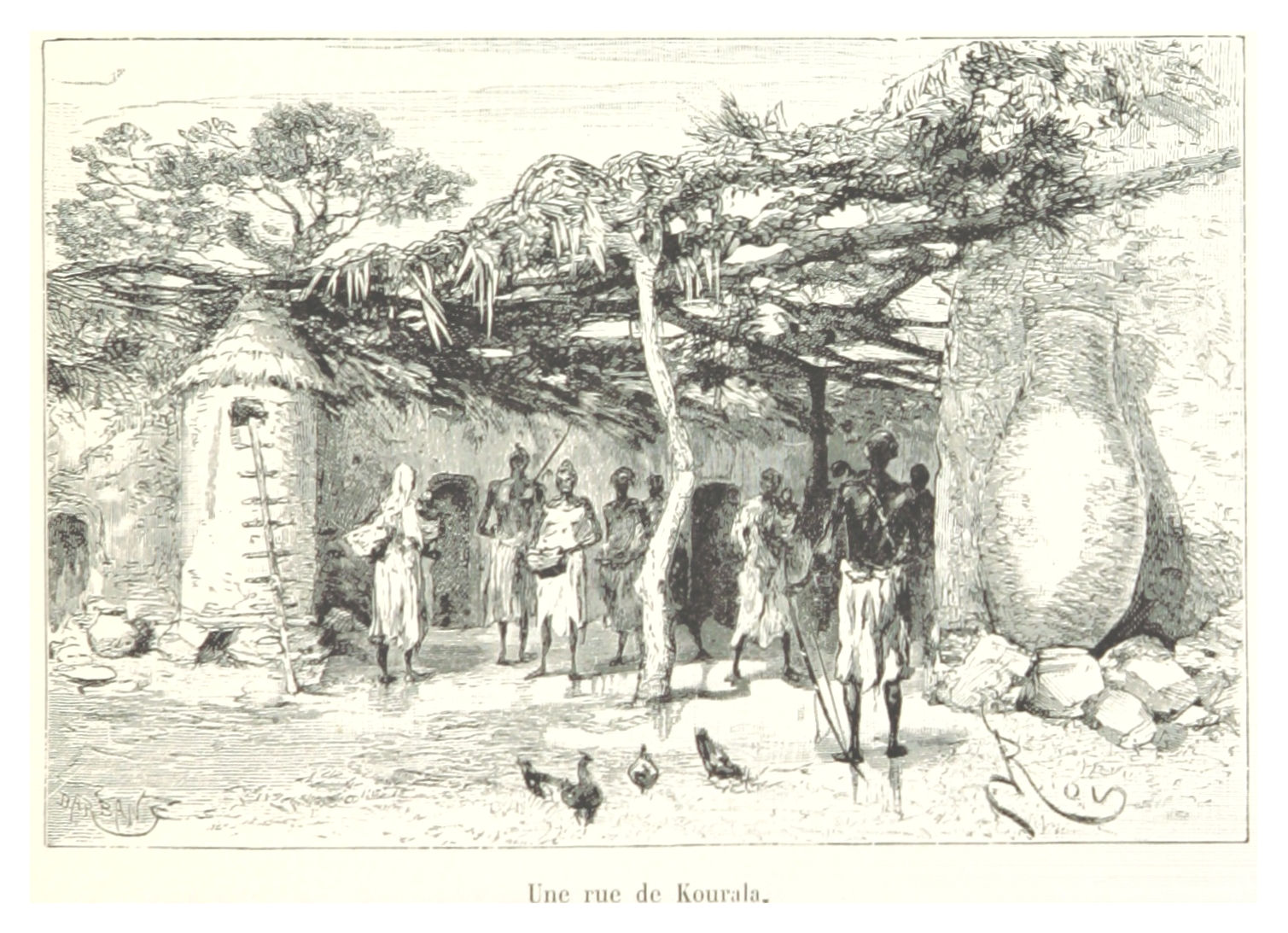
- A street in N'Kourala, 1892

- Location in Mali
- Coordinates: 11°21′35″N 6°6′50″W
- Country: Mali
- Region: Sikasso Region
- Cercle: Sikasso Cercle
- Commune: Kapolondougou
- Time zone: UTC+0 (GMT)

N'Kourala is a village and seat of the commune of Kapolondougou in the Cercle of Sikasso in the Sikasso Region of southern Mali. The village lies 50 km west of Sikasso on the main road, the RN7, linking Sikasso and Bougouni.
