= N'Tjila =

- Village
- Location in Mali
- Coordinates: 11°30′33″N 6°30′22″W
- Country: Mali
- Region: Sikasso Region
- Cercle: Sikasso Cercle
- Commune: Wateni
- Time zone: UTC+0 (GMT)

N'Tjila is a village and seat of the commune of Wateni in the Cercle of Sikasso in the Sikasso Region of southern Mali. It is 94 km west-northwest of Sikasso.
