= Bougoula, Sikasso =

Coordinates: 10°47′N 6°55′W

- Commune and town
- Interactive map of Bougoula, Sikasso
- Country: Mali
- Region: Sikasso Region
- Cercle: Kolondieba Cercle

Population (1998)
  - Total: 4,035
- Time zone: UTC+0 (GMT)

Bougoula, Sikasso is a small town and commune in the Cercle of Kolondieba in the Sikasso Region of southern Mali. In 1998 the commune had a population of 4,035.

Bougoula was the capital of the Kénédougou Kingdom until 1877 when Tieba Traoré moved it to Sikasso.
