= Zangaradougou =

- Commune and village
- Location in Mali
- Coordinates: 11°23′13″N 5°35′55″W
- Country: Mali
- Region: Sikasso Region
- Cercle: Sikasso Cercle

Area
  - Total: 99 km^{2} (38 sq mi)

Population (2009 census)
  - Total: 6,818
  - Density: 69/km^{2} (180/sq mi)
- Time zone: UTC+0 (GMT)

Zangaradougou is a village and rural commune in the Cercle of Sikasso in the Sikasso Region of southern Mali. The commune covers an area of 99 square kilometers and includes five villages. In the 2009 census it had a population of 6,818. The village of Zangaradougou, the administrative center (chef-lieu) of the commune, is 11 km northeast of Sikasso.
