= Kaboïla =

- Commune and village
- Location in Mali
- Coordinates: 11°12′49″N 5°38′5″W
- Country: Mali
- Region: Sikasso Region
- Cercle: Sikasso Cercle

Area
  - Total: 654 km^{2} (253 sq mi)

Population (2009 census)
  - Total: 26,272
  - Density: 40.2/km^{2} (104/sq mi)
- Time zone: UTC+0 (GMT)

Kaboïla is a village and rural commune in the Cercle of Sikasso in the Sikasso Region of southern Mali. The commune covers an area of 654 square kilometers and includes 26 villages. In the 2009 census it had a population of 26,272. The village of Kaboïla is 12 km south of Sikasso near the main road, the RN7, linking Sikasso with Ouangolodougou in the Ivory Coast.
