= Ménamba I =

- Commune and village
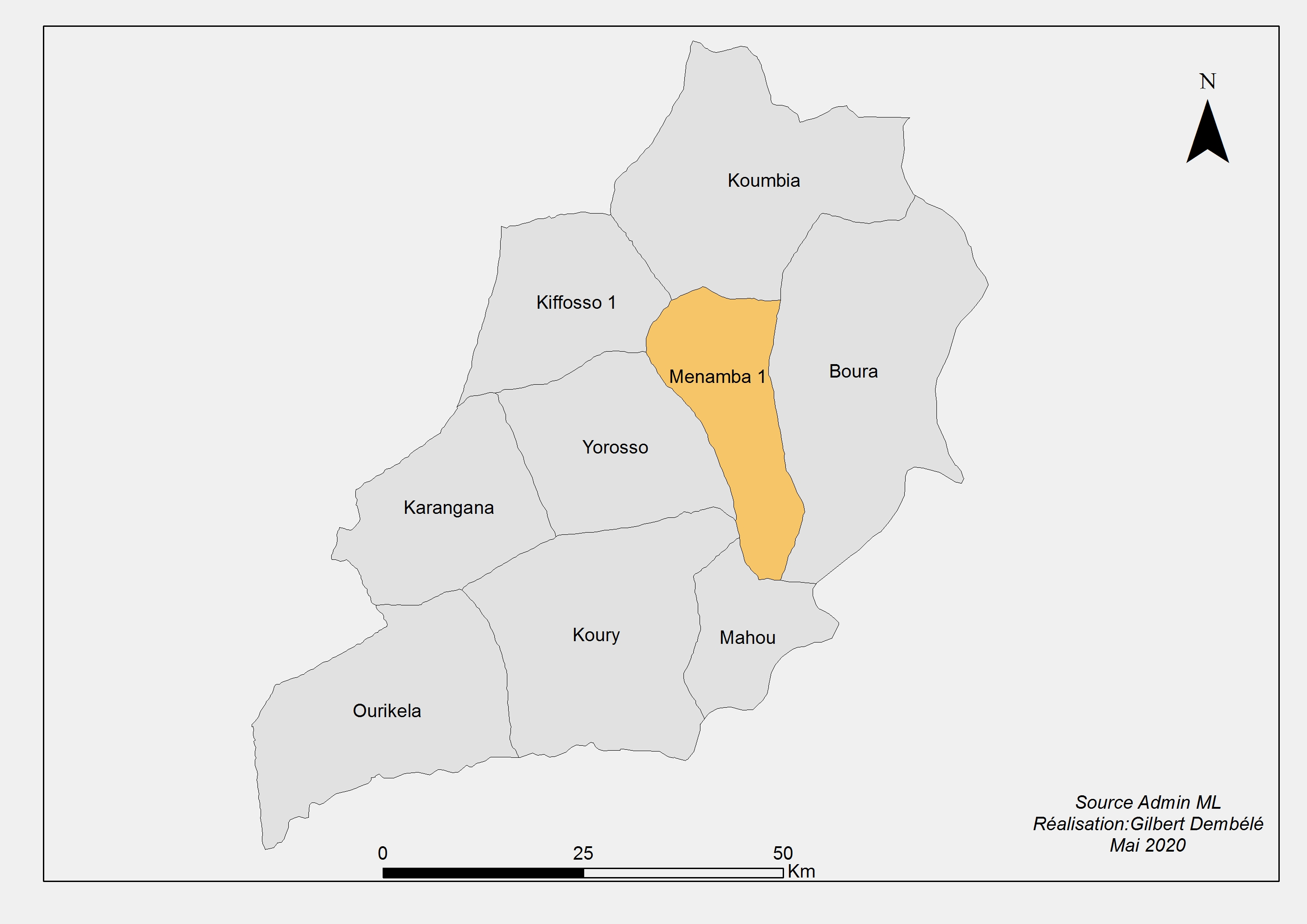

- Location in Mali
- Coordinates: 12°23′44″N 4°40′24″W
- Country: Mali
- Region: Sikasso Region
- Cercle: Yorosso Cercle

Area
  - Total: 328 km^{2} (127 sq mi)

Population (2009 census)
  - Total: 10,449
  - Density: 31.9/km^{2} (82.5/sq mi)
- Time zone: UTC+0 (GMT)

Ménamba I is a village and rural commune in the Cercle of Yorosso in the Sikasso Region of southern Mali. The commune covers an area of 328 square kilometers and includes 8 villages. In the 2009 census it had a population of 10,449. The village of Ménamba I, the administrative center (chef-lieu) of the commune, is 12 km east-northeast of Yorosso.
