= Doumanaba =

- Commune and town
- Location in Mali
- Coordinates: 11°40′9″N 5°55′50″W
- Country: Mali
- Region: Sikasso Region
- Cercle: Sikasso Cercle

Area
  - Total: 288 km^{2} (111 sq mi)

Population (2009 census)
  - Total: 15,105
  - Density: 52.4/km^{2} (136/sq mi)
- Time zone: UTC+0 (GMT)

Doumanaba is a small town and rural commune in the Cercle of Sikasso in the Sikasso Region of southern Mali. The commune covers an area of 288 square kilometers and includes the town and seven villages. In the 2009 census it had a population of 15,105. The town of Doumanaba, the chef-lieu of the commune, is 49 km northwest of Sikasso.

The French explorer René Caillié stopped at Doumanaba in February 1828 on his journey to Timbuktu. He was travelling with a caravan transporting kola nuts to Djenné. In his book Travels through Central Africa to Timbuctoo published in 1830, he refers to what was then a village as Toumané. Caillié was impressed with the range of goods on sale in the market and wrote:

I went to see the market, which I found better than those of the villages through which I had previously passed. It was held under a sort of penthouse, which kept off the rain in bad weather. It was very well supplied with all the productions of the country. I even saw butcher's meant and European commodities, such as cloth, muskets, powder and glass trinkets.

== Sources ==
- Caillié, René (1830). Travels through Central Africa to Timbuctoo; and across the Great Desert, to Morocco, performed in the years 1824-1828 (Volume 1). London: Colburn & Bentley.
- Viguier, Pierre (2008). Sur les Traces de René Caillié: Le Mali de 1828 Revisité. Versailles, France: Quae. ISBN 978-2-7592-0271-3..
