= Karangana =

- Commune and village
- Location in Mali
- Coordinates: 12°13′15″N 5°2′0″W
- Country: Mali
- Region: Sikasso Region
- Cercle: Yorosso Cercle

Area
  - Total: 398 km^{2} (154 sq mi)

Population (2009 census)
  - Total: 17,299
  - Density: 43.5/km^{2} (113/sq mi)
- Time zone: UTC+0 (GMT)

Karangana is a village and rural commune in the Cercle of Yorosso in the Sikasso Region of southern Mali. The commune covers an area of 398 square kilometers and includes 9 villages. In the 2009 census it had a population of 17,299. The village of Karangana, the administrative center (chef-lieu) of the commune, is 32 km southwest of Yorosso.
