= Diomaténé =

- Commune and village
- Location in Mali
- Coordinates: 11°24′58″N 5°39′20″W
- Country: Mali
- Region: Sikasso Region
- Cercle: Sikasso Cercle

Area
  - Total: 96 km^{2} (37 sq mi)

Population (2009 census)
  - Total: 4,274
  - Density: 45/km^{2} (120/sq mi)
- Time zone: UTC+0 (GMT)

Diomaténé is a village and rural commune in the Cercle of Sikasso in the Sikasso Region of southern Mali. The commune covers an area of 96 square kilometers and includes four villages. In the 2009 census, it had a population of 4,274. The village of Diomaténé, the chef-lieu of the commune, is 11 km north of Sikasso.
