= Pimperna =

- Commune and village
- Location in Mali
- Coordinates: 11°25′50″N 5°45′15″W
- Country: Mali
- Region: Sikasso Region
- Cercle: Sikasso Cercle

Area
  - Total: 161 km^{2} (62 sq mi)

Population (2009 census)
  - Total: 11,329
  - Density: 70.4/km^{2} (182/sq mi)
- Time zone: UTC+0 (GMT)

Pimperna is a village and rural commune in the Cercle of Sikasso in the Sikasso Region of southern Mali. The commune covers an area of 161 square kilometers and includes 10 villages. In the 2009 census it had a population of 11,329. The village of Pimperna, the administrative center (chef-lieu) of the commune, is 16 km northwest of Sikasso on the RN11, the main road between Sikasso and Koutiala.
