= Mahou, Mali =

Mahou
- Commune and village
- Location in Mali
- Coordinates: 12°8′0″N 4°37′45″W
- Country: Mali
- Region: Sikasso Region
- Cercle: Yorosso Cercle

Area
  - Total: 263 km^{2} (102 sq mi)

Population (2009 census)
  - Total: 16,212
  - Density: 61.6/km^{2} (160/sq mi)
- Time zone: UTC+0 (GMT)

Mahou is a village and rural commune in the Yorosso Cercle in the Sikasso Region of southern Mali. The commune covers an area of 263 square kilometers and includes 4 villages. In the 2009 census it had a population of 16,212. The village of Mahou, the administrative center (chef-lieu), is 30 km southeast of Yorosso on the border with Burkina Faso.
