= Benkadi, Sikasso =

Benkadi
- Commune
- Location in Mali
- Coordinates: 11°37′5″N 6°25′35″W
- Country: Mali
- Region: Sikasso Region
- Cercle: Sikasso Cercle

Area
  - Total: 175 km^{2} (68 sq mi)

Population (2009 census)
  - Total: 3,077
  - Density: 17.6/km^{2} (45.5/sq mi)
- Time zone: UTC+0 (GMT)

Benkadi is a rural commune in the Cercle of Sikasso in the Sikasso Region of southern Mali. The commune covers an area of 175 square kilometers and includes 7 villages. In the 2009 census it had a population of 3,077. The main village (chef-lieu) of Koungoba is 89 km west-northwest of Sikasso.
