= Blendio =

- Commune and town
- Location in Mali
- Coordinates: 11°36′48″N 6°20′40″W
- Country: Mali
- Region: Sikasso Region
- Cercle: Sikasso Cercle

Area
  - Total: 369 km^{2} (142 sq mi)

Population (2009 census)
  - Total: 18,207
  - Density: 49.3/km^{2} (128/sq mi)
- Time zone: UTC+0 (GMT)

Blendio is a small town and rural commune in the Cercle of Sikasso in the Sikasso Region of southern Mali. The commune covers an area of 369 square kilometers and includes the town and 13 villages. In the 2009 census it had a population of 18,207. The town of Blendio, the chef-lieu of the commune, is 81 km west-northwest of Sikasso.
