= Nongo-Souala =

- Commune and village
- Location in Mali
- Coordinates: 11°45′33″N 5°33′48″W
- Country: Mali
- Region: Sikasso Region
- Cercle: Sikasso Cercle

Area
  - Total: 264 km^{2} (102 sq mi)

Population (2009 census)
  - Total: 4,578
  - Density: 17.3/km^{2} (44.9/sq mi)
- Time zone: UTC+0 (GMT)

Nongo-Souala is a village rural commune in the Cercle of Sikasso in the Sikasso Region of southern Mali. The commune covers an area of 264 square kilometers and includes four villages. In the 2009 census it had a population of 4,578. The village of Nongo-Souala, the administrative center (chef-lieu) of the commune, is 50 km north of Sikasso.
