= Zaniéna =

- Commune and village
- Location in Mali
- Coordinates: 11°16′15″N 6°25′25″W
- Country: Mali
- Region: Sikasso Region
- Cercle: Sikasso Cercle

Area
  - Total: 174 km^{2} (67 sq mi)

Population (2009 census)
  - Total: 10,038
  - Density: 57.7/km^{2} (149/sq mi)
- Time zone: UTC+0 (GMT)

Zaniéna is a village and rural commune in the Cercle of Sikasso in the Sikasso Region of southern Mali. The commune covers an area of 174 square kilometers and includes ten villages. In the 2009 census it had a population of 10,038. The village of Zaniéna, the administrative center (chef-lieu) of the commune, is 83 km west of Sikasso.
