= Natien =

- Commune and village
- Location in Mali
- Coordinates: 11°19′55″N 5°49′35″W
- Country: Mali
- Region: Sikasso Region
- Cercle: Sikasso Cercle

Area
  - Total: 207 km^{2} (80 sq mi)

Population (2009 census)
  - Total: 7,404
  - Density: 35.8/km^{2} (92.6/sq mi)
- Time zone: UTC+0 (GMT)

Natien is a village and rural commune in the Cercle of Sikasso in the Sikasso Region of southern Mali. The commune covers an area of 207 square kilometers and includes 9 villages. In the 2009 census it had a population of 7,404. The village of Natien, the administrative center (chef-lieu) of the commune, is 18 km west of Sikasso on the RN7, the main road linking Sikasso and Bougouni.
