= Sanzana =

- Commune and village
- Location in Mali
- Coordinates: 11°44′55″N 5°57′0″W
- Country: Mali
- Region: Sikasso Region
- Cercle: Sikasso Cercle

Area
  - Total: 326 km^{2} (126 sq mi)

Population (2009 census)
  - Total: 11,214
  - Density: 34.4/km^{2} (89.1/sq mi)
- Time zone: UTC+0 (GMT)

Sanzana is a village and rural commune in the Cercle of Sikasso in the Sikasso Region of southern Mali. The commune covers an area of 326 square kilometers and includes eight villages. In the 2009 census it had a population of 11,214. The village of Sanzana, the administrative center (chef-lieu) of the commune, is 57 km northwest of region capital Sikasso.
