= Kafouziéla =

- Commune and village
- Location in Mali
- Coordinates: 11°25′39″N 5°36′45″W
- Country: Mali
- Region: Sikasso Region
- Cercle: Sikasso Cercle

Area
  - Total: 59 km^{2} (23 sq mi)

Population (1998)
  - Total: 4,589
  - Density: 78/km^{2} (200/sq mi)
- Time zone: UTC+0 (GMT)

Kafouziéla is a village and rural commune in the Cercle of Sikasso in the Sikasso Region of southern Mali. The commune covers an area of 59 square kilometers and includes six villages. In the 2009 census it had a population of 4,589. The village of Kafouziéla, the chef-lieu of the commune, is 14 km north of Sikasso.
