= Boura, Mali =

Boura
- Commune and village
- Location in Mali
- Coordinates: 12°24′50″N 4°32′39″W
- Country: Mali
- Region: Sikasso Region
- Cercle: Yorosso Cercle

Area
  - Total: 887 km^{2} (342 sq mi)

Population (2009 census)
  - Total: 22,735
  - Density: 25.6/km^{2} (66.4/sq mi)
- Time zone: UTC+0 (GMT)

Boura is a village and rural commune in the Cercle of Yorosso in the Sikasso Region of southern Mali. The commune covers an area of 887 square kilometers and includes 15 villages. In the 2009 census it had a population of 22,735. The village of Boura, the administrative center (chef-lieu) of the commune, is 26 km east of Yorosso, just to the north of the road, the D14, that links Yorosso with Sanaba in Burkina Faso.
