= Koury, Mali =

Koury
- Commune and town
- Location in Mali
- Coordinates: 12°11′0″N 4°48′20″W
- Country: Mali
- Region: Sikasso Region
- Cercle: Yorosso Cercle

Area
  - Total: 712 km^{2} (275 sq mi)

Population (2009 census)
  - Total: 54,435
  - Density: 76.5/km^{2} (198/sq mi)
- Time zone: UTC+0 (GMT)

Koury is a small town and rural commune in the Cercle of Yorosso in the Sikasso Region of southern Mali. The commune covers an area of 712 square kilometers or 275 square miles and includes the town and 16 villages. In the 2009 census it had a population of 54,435. The town, the administrative center (chef-lieu) of the commune, is 19 km south of Yorosso on the main road linking Koutiala in Mali with the town of Bobo-Dioulasso in Burkina Faso.
