= Koumankou =

- Commune and village
- Location in Mali
- Coordinates: 12°5′48″N 6°8′22″W
- Country: Mali
- Region: Sikasso Region
- Cercle: Sikasso Cercle

Area
  - Total: 243 km^{2} (94 sq mi)

Population (2009 census)
  - Total: 4,227
  - Density: 17.4/km^{2} (45.1/sq mi)
- Time zone: UTC+0 (GMT)

Koumankou is a village and rural commune in the Cercle of Sikasso in the Sikasso Region of southern Mali. The commune covers an area of 243 square kilometers and includes 4 villages. In the 2009 census it had a population of 4,227. The village of Koumankou, the chef-lieu of the commune, is 101 km northwest of Sikasso.
