= Kolokoba =

- Commune and town
- Location in Mali
- Coordinates: 11°12′42″N 5°59′55″W
- Country: Mali
- Region: Sikasso Region
- Cercle: Sikasso Cercle

Area
  - Total: 249 km^{2} (96 sq mi)

Population (2009 census)
  - Total: 3,242
  - Density: 13.0/km^{2} (33.7/sq mi)
- Time zone: UTC+0 (GMT)

Kolokoba is a village and rural commune in the Cercle of Sikasso in the Sikasso Region of southern Mali. The commune covers an area of 249 square kilometers and includes 10 villages. In the 2009 census it had a population of 3,242. The main village of Kolokoba, the chef-lieu of the commune, is 38 km west-southwest of Sikasso.
