= Finkolo =

- Commune and village
- Location in Mali
- Coordinates: 11°16′5″N 5°30′40″W
- Country: Mali
- Region: Sikasso Region
- Cercle: Sikasso Cercle

Area
  - Total: 477 km^{2} (184 sq mi)

Population (2009 census)
  - Total: 22,429
  - Density: 47.0/km^{2} (122/sq mi)
- Time zone: UTC+0 (GMT)

Finkolo is a village and rural commune in the Cercle of Sikasso in the Sikasso Region of southern Mali. The commune covers an area of 477 square kilometers and includes 11 villages. In the 2009 census it had a population of 22,429. The village of Finoko, the chef-lieu of the commune, is 18 km east-southeast of Sikasso on the N7, the small road that links Sikasso with Bobo-Dioulasso in Burkina Faso.
