= Tiankadi =

- Commune
- Location in Mali
- Coordinates: 11°38′22″N 6°6′42″W
- Country: Mali
- Region: Sikasso Region
- Cercle: Sikasso Cercle

Area
  - Total: 70 km^{2} (27 sq mi)

Population (2009 census)
  - Total: 4,674
  - Density: 67/km^{2} (170/sq mi)
- Time zone: UTC+0 (GMT)

Tiankadi is a commune in the Cercle of Sikasso in the Sikasso Region of southern Mali. The commune covers an area of 70 square kilometers and includes three villages. In the 2009 census it had a population of 4,674. The village of Zibangolola, the administrative center (chef-lieu) of the commune, is 60 km northwest of Sikasso.
