= Zanférébougou =

- Commune and village
- Location in Mali
- Coordinates: 11°17′6″N 6°4′6″W
- Country: Mali
- Region: Sikasso Region
- Cercle: Sikasso Cercle

Area
  - Total: 68 km^{2} (26 sq mi)

Population (2009 census)
  - Total: 7,275
  - Density: 110/km^{2} (280/sq mi)
- Time zone: UTC+0 (GMT)

Zanférébougou is a village and rural commune in the Cercle of Sikasso in the Sikasso Region of southern Mali. The commune covers an area of 68 square kilometers and includes three villages. In the 2009 census it had a population of 7,275. The village of Zanférébougou, the administrative center (chef-lieu) of the commune, is 44 km west of Sikasso and 7 km south of the RN7, the main road linking Sikasso and Bougouni.
