= Farakala =

- Commune and village
- Location in Mali
- Coordinates: 11°21′30″N 6°0′20″W
- Country: Mali
- Region: Sikasso Region
- Cercle: Sikasso Cercle

Area
  - Total: 280 km^{2} (110 sq mi)

Population (2009 census)
  - Total: 7,960
  - Density: 28/km^{2} (74/sq mi)
- Time zone: UTC+0 (GMT)

Farakala is a village and commune in the Cercle of Sikasso in the Sikasso Region of southern Mali. The commune covers an area of 280 square kilometers (110 sq mi) and includes 11 villages. In the 2009 census it had a population of 7,960. The village of Farakala lies 40 km (25 mi) west of Sikasso on the RN7 highway linking Sikasso and Bougouni.
