= Miniko =

- Commune and village
- Location in Mali
- Coordinates: 11°10′32″N 6°20′0″W
- Country: Mali
- Region: Sikasso Region
- Cercle: Sikasso Cercle

Area
  - Total: 128 km^{2} (49 sq mi)

Population (2009 census)
  - Total: 3,288
- Time zone: UTC+0 (GMT)

Miniko is a village and rural commune in the Cercle of Sikasso in the Sikasso Region of southern Mali. The commune covers an area of 128 square kilometers and includes six villages. In the 2009 census it had a population of 3,288. The village of Miniko-Soba, the administrative center (chef-lieu) of the commune, is 33 km southwest of Sikasso.
