= N'Tjikouna =

- Commune and village
- Location in Mali
- Coordinates: 11°7′30″N 6°14′15″W
- Country: Mali
- Region: Sikasso Region
- Cercle: Sikasso Cercle

Area
  - Total: 104 km^{2} (40 sq mi)
- Elevation: 322 m (1,056 ft)

Population (2009 census)
  - Total: 4,604
  - Density: 44.3/km^{2} (115/sq mi)
- Time zone: UTC+0 (GMT)

N'Tjikouna is a village and rural commune in the Cercle of Sikasso in the Sikasso Region of southern Mali. The commune covers an area of 104 square kilometers and includes five villages. In the 2009 census it had a population of 4604. The village of N'Tjikouna, the administrative center (chef-lieu) of the commune, is 66 km southwest of Sikasso.
