= Zibangolola =

- village
- Location in Mali
- Coordinates: 11°38′22″N 6°6′42″W
- Country: Mali
- Region: Sikasso Region
- Cercle: Sikasso Cercle
- Commune: Tiankadi
- Time zone: UTC+0 (GMT)

Zibangolola is a village and seat of the commune of Tiankadi in the Cercle of Sikasso in the Sikasso Region of southern Mali.
