= Dogoni =

- Commune and town
- Location in Mali
- Coordinates: 12°8′37″N 6°0′37″W
- Country: Mali
- Region: Sikasso Region
- Cercle: Sikasso Cercle

Area
  - Total: 361 km^{2} (139 sq mi)

Population (2009 census)
  - Total: 15,186
  - Density: 42.1/km^{2} (109/sq mi)
- Time zone: UTC+0 (GMT)

Dogoni is a small town and rural commune in the Cercle of Sikasso in the Sikasso Region of southern Mali. The commune covers an area of 361 square kilometers and includes the town and 12 villages. In the 2009 census it had a population of 15,186. The town of Dogoni, the chef-lieu of the commune, is 100 km north-northwest of Sikasso.
