= Kapala, Sikasso =

Kapala
- Commune and village
- Location in Mali
- Coordinates: 11°7′0″N 5°43′15″W
- Country: Mali
- Region: Sikasso Region
- Cercle: Sikasso Cercle

Area
  - Total: 175 km^{2} (68 sq mi)

Population (2009 census)
  - Total: 10,210
  - Density: 58.3/km^{2} (151/sq mi)
- Time zone: UTC+0 (GMT)

Kapala is a village and rural commune in the Cercle of Sikasso in the Sikasso Region of southern Mali. The commune covers an area of 175 square kilometers and includes eight villages. In the 2009 census it had a population of 10,200. The village of Kapala is about 25 km south of Sikasso.
