= Finkolo Ganadougou =

- Commune
- Location in Mali
- Coordinates: 11°13′37″N 6°11′47″W
- Country: Mali
- Region: Sikasso Region
- Cercle: Sikasso Cercle
- Admin HQ (Chef-lieu): Finkolo

Area
  - Total: 464 km^{2} (179 sq mi)

Population (2009 census)
  - Total: 8,498
  - Density: 18.3/km^{2} (47.4/sq mi)
- Time zone: UTC+0 (GMT)

Finkolo Ganadougou is a rural commune in the Cercle of Sikasso in the Sikasso Region of southern Mali. The commune covers an area of 464 square kilometers and includes the 16 villages. In the 2009 census it had a population of 8,498. The main village (chef-lieu) is the village of Finkolo. The village of Finkolo, the chef-lieu of the commune, is 59 km west of Sikasso.
