= Kouoro =

- Commune and town

- Location in Mali
- Coordinates: 11°58′5″N 5°41′19″W
- Country: Mali
- Region: Sikasso Region
- Cercle: Sikasso Cercle

Area
  - Total: 472 km^{2} (182 sq mi)
- Elevation: 300 m (980 ft)

Population (2023 census)
  - Total: 23,169
  - Density: 49.1/km^{2} (127/sq mi)
- Time zone: UTC+0 (GMT)

Kouoro is a small town and rural commune in the Cercle of Kléla in the Sikasso Region of southern Mali. The commune covers an area of 472 square kilometers and includes the town and five villages. In the 2023 census it had a population of 23,169. The town of Kouoro, the chef-lieu of the commune, is 80 km north of Sikasso, just off of the RN11, the main road linking Sikasso and Koutiala. It is also about 30 km west of the border with Burkina Faso.

== Villages ==
- Katierla
- Koumbala
- Kouoro
- Makono
- Sokourani
- Sougoula
- Koloni

== Population history ==
Historical population
Year	Pop.	±%
1998 (census)	10,782	—
2009 (estimate)	11,315	+4.9%

== History ==
The French explorer René Caillié stopped at Kouoro in February 1828 on his journey to Timbuktu. He was travelling with a caravan transporting kola nuts to Djenné. In his book Travels through Central Africa to Timbuctoo published in 1830, he refers to what was then a village as Couara. Caillié wrote:

At nine o'clock in the morning we halted at Couara, a pretty village, where we found an abundance of all the necessities of life. The inhabitants grow a great deal of cotton and millet, and are supplied with water from a stream that runs E.N.E., half a mile from the village.

What Caillié referred to as a stream was actually the Banifing River, a tributary of the Bani but in February it would have had very little water.

Not long after Mali declared independence from France in 1960, an annular solar eclipse took place on 31 July 1962, some 4 km northwest was the center of the greatest eclipse that happened at 12:25 GMT and 12 N, 5.7 W and included Kouoro and lasted for 3 1/2 minutes.

In 2017 a new road bridge over the Banifing opened to replace one built in 1963 that, due to its design and age, could not handle the amount of traffic on the modern RN11.

== Sources ==
- Caillié, René (1830). Travels through Central Africa to Timbuctoo; and across the Great Desert, to Morocco, performed in the years 1824-1828 (Volume 1). London: Colburn & Bentley.
- Viguier, Pierre (2008). Sur les Traces de René Caillié: Le Mali de 1828 Revisité. Versailles, France: Quae. ISBN 978-2-7592-0271-3..
