= Dialakoro, Mali =

Dialakoro
- Commune and village
- Location in Mali
- Coordinates: 12°4′35″N 6°7′12″W
- Country: Mali
- Region: Sikasso Region
- Cercle: Sikasso Cercle

Area
  - Total: 83 km^{2} (32 sq mi)

Population (2009 census)
  - Total: 6,893
  - Density: 83/km^{2} (220/sq mi)
- Time zone: UTC+0 (GMT)

Dialakoro is a village and rural commune in the Cercle of Sikasso in the Sikasso Region of southern Mali. The commune covers an area of 83 square kilometers and includes four villages. In the 2009 census it had a population of 6,893. The village of Dialakoro, the chef-lieu of the commune, is 98 km northwest of Sikasso.
