= Fama, Mali =

Fama
- Commune and town
- Location in Mali
- Coordinates: 11°31′40″N 5°41′30″W
- Country: Mali
- Region: Sikasso Region
- Cercle: Sikasso Cercle

Area
  - Total: 222 km^{2} (86 sq mi)

Population (2009 census)
  - Total: 7,960
  - Density: 35.9/km^{2} (92.9/sq mi)
- Time zone: UTC+0 (GMT)

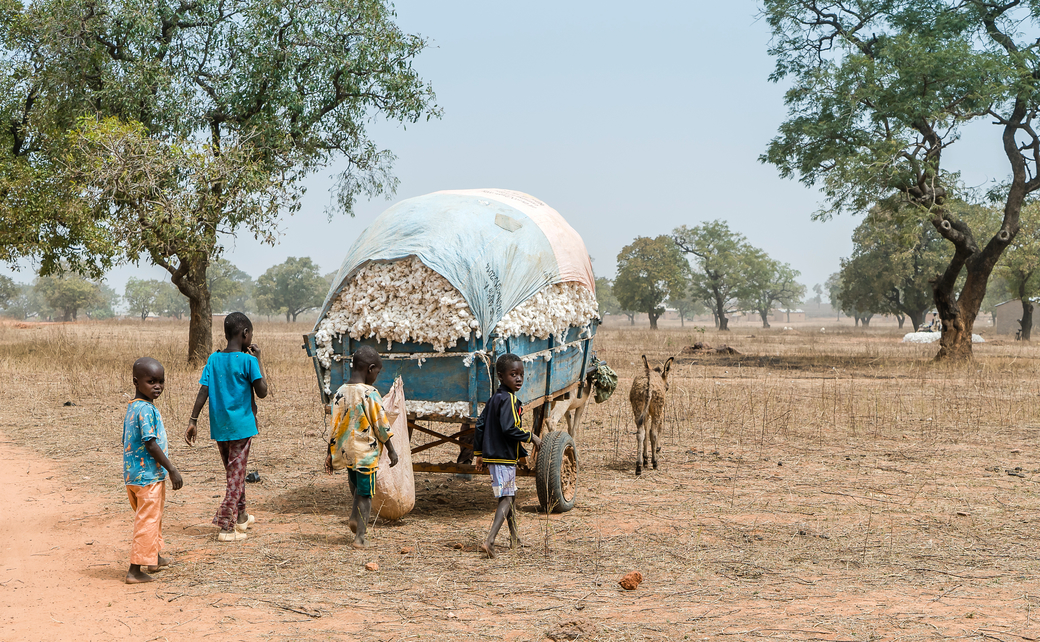
Children with cotton crop

Fama is a small town and rural commune in the Cercle of Sikasso in the Sikasso Region of southern Mali. The commune covers an area of 222 square kilometers and includes the town and five villages. In the 2009 census it had a population of 7,960. The town of Fama, the chef-lieu of the commune, is 24 km north of Sikasso.
