= Koungoba =

- village
- Location in Mali
- Coordinates: 11°37′5″N 6°25′35″W
- Country: Mali
- Region: Sikasso Region
- Cercle: Sikasso Cercle
- Commune: Benkadi
- Time zone: UTC+0 (GMT)

Koungoba is a village and seat of the commune of Benkadi in the Cercle of Sikasso in the Sikasso Region of southern Mali.
