= Ourikéla =

- Commune and village
- Location in Mali
- Coordinates: 12°6′38″N 5°3′45″W
- Country: Mali
- Region: Sikasso Region
- Cercle: Yorosso Cercle

Area
  - Total: 576 km^{2} (222 sq mi)

Population (2009 census)
  - Total: 23,855
  - Density: 41.4/km^{2} (107/sq mi)
- Time zone: UTC+0 (GMT)

Ourikéla is a village and rural commune in the Cercle of Yorosso in the Sikasso Region of southern Mali. The commune covers an area of 578 square kilometers and includes 10 villages. In the 2009 census it had a population of 23,855. The village of Ourikéla, the administrative center (chef-lieu) of the commune, is 41 km southwest of Yorosso.
