= Kléla =

- Commune and town
- Location in Mali
- Coordinates: 11°41′15″N 5°39′50″W
- Country: Mali
- Region: Sikasso Region
- Cercle: Sikasso Cercle

Area
  - Total: 786 km^{2} (303 sq mi)

Population (2009 census)
  - Total: 31,334
  - Density: 39.9/km^{2} (103/sq mi)
- Time zone: UTC+0 (GMT)

Kléla is a small town and rural commune in the Cercle of Sikasso in the Sikasso Region of southern Mali. The commune covers an area of 786 square kilometers and includes the town and 13 villages. In the 2009 census it had a population of 31,334. The town of Kléla is 43 km north of Sikasso.
