= Wateni =

- Commune
- Location in Mali
- Coordinates: 11°30′33″N 6°30′22″W
- Country: Mali
- Region: Sikasso Region
- Cercle: Sikasso Cercle

Area
  - Total: 211 km^{2} (81 sq mi)

Population (2009 census)
  - Total: 6,701
  - Density: 31.8/km^{2} (82.3/sq mi)
  - Ethnicities: Bambara Fulani
- Time zone: UTC+0 (GMT)

Wateni (or Waténi) is a rural commune in the Cercle of Sikasso in the Sikasso Region of southern Mali. The commune covers an area of 211 square kilometers and includes ten villages. In the 2009 census it had a population of 6,701. The village of N'Tjila, the administrative center (chef-lieu) of the commune, is 94 km west-northwest of Sikasso.

== History ==
The name Wateni was given to the commune by a meeting of the eleven village chiefs in memory of the founder of the historical kingdom of Ganadougou: Wateni Diallo (pronounced waat-e-nay djia-low)

The rural commune Wateni was created on November 4, 1996, by law No 96-059, for the creation of communes in Mali.

== Geography ==
The Rural Commune Wateni is located North-West of Niena.

The commune is bordered in the north by the commune of Benkadi and in the south and south-east by the rural commune of Niena, and in the north-east by the commune of Blendio, and in the west by the cercle of Bougouni.

The commune is composed of ten villages: N'tjilla (commune capital), Bougoulaba, Tiala, M'pankourou, Fougani, Diegui, Miambougou, Mononomo, Sibirila, and Chokoro.

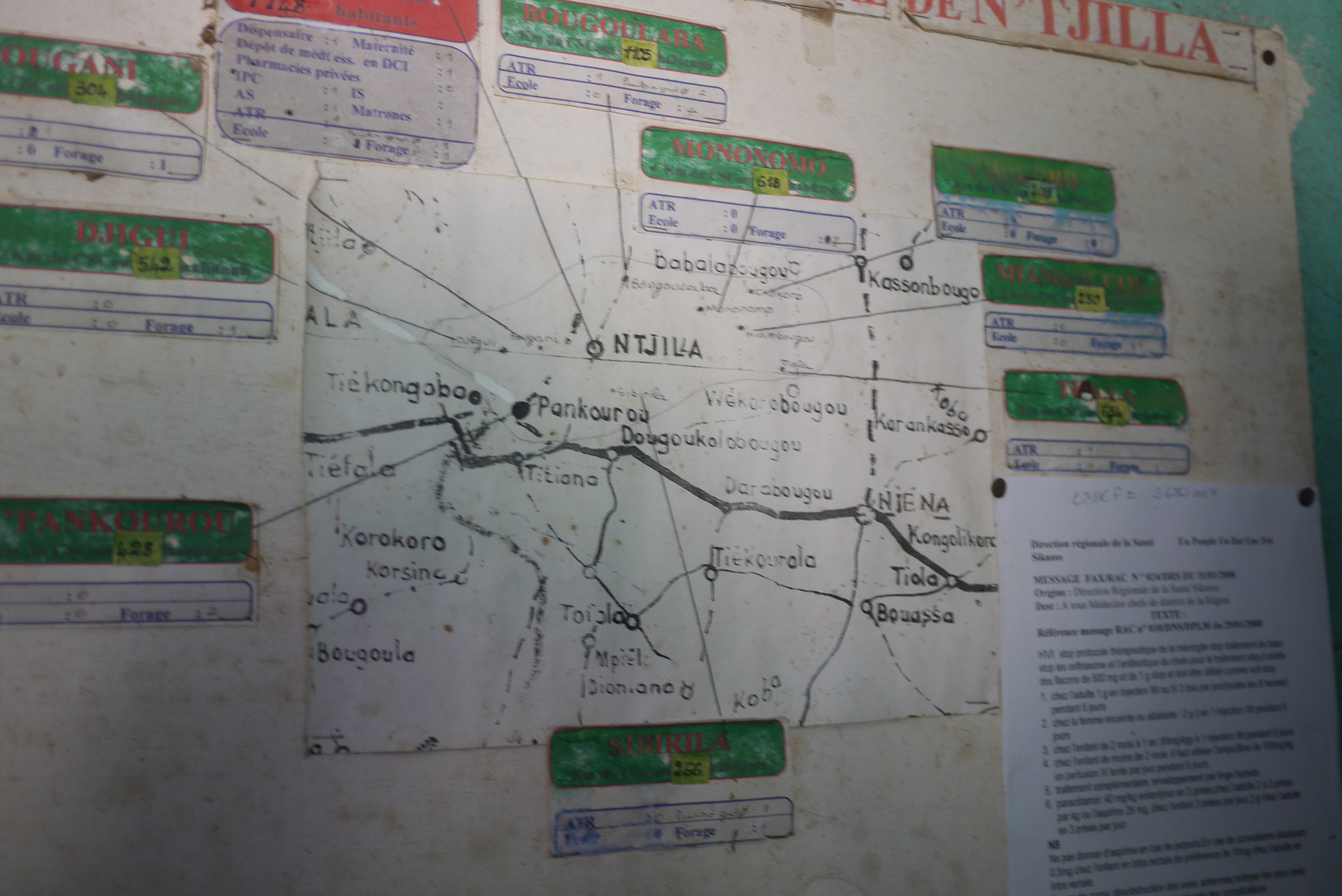
Map of the Rural Commune as posted in the CSCOM in N'tjilla.

The capitol of the commune, N'tjilla, is located 7 km off Route 7 from Bamako to Zegoua. N'tjilla is 23 km from Niena, 98 km from Sikasso (the capital of the Sikasso region or cercle), and 295 km from Bamako, the national capital.

The commune covers an area of 200 square kilometers. It is situated in the Sahel WITH two main seasons: dry season (from the end of October to the end of April) and rainy season (from May through the beginning of October). The annual rain fall varies between 800 and 1500 mm.

== Demography ==
As of a 2009 Census, the commune has a population of 6,701. The population consists of 3352 men and 3349 women. In 1998, it had a population of 5,152, which is a rate of 2.4% growth per annum.

The population is composed of a majority of Fulani and Bambara ethnic groups who co-habitate peacefully. They are farmers and animal breeders.

== Social situation ==
The social structure is dominated by a traditional chief, or dugutigi. Beneath the village chief, each village has various cultural associations divided by gender and age group. In addition to village associations, there are youth associations, women's associations, and development associations.

Although Bambara language is the official language in the commune, the primary language is Gana, named after the kingdom of Ganadougou.

The illiteracy rate is very high. Stories, history, and legends are transmitted orally between generations. The caste responsible for keeping the oral tradition alive is called the griot.

Traditional musical instruments are often played at parties and holidays: balafon, boli, kamale n'goni and guida.

The commune contains several tourist sites: Djinemini, belekeli, kokoni, sacred forests, and the resting place of Ganadougou's founding father Wateni Diallo.

== Civil society ==
CMDT (Compagnie Malienne pour le Developpement du Textile) has created a Village Associations in every village in the commune. These groups are charged with growing, harvesting, and selling cotton to CMDT.

Former citizens of the Commune Wateni have an association called the "Association des Ressoritissants de Wateni" (ARW) which is located in Bamako.

== Economy ==
The principal economic activities in the Commune are agriculture, fishing, bee-keeping, gardening, and small business. The main crops are: dry cereals (millet, sorghum, rice, and corn) and revenue generating crops (cotton, peanuts, and beans).

Animal breeding is the second largest activity after agriculture. Animals bred in the commune include cattle, sheep, goats, and poultry. The cattle are traded as close as Niena and Koumantou and as far away as Bamako and Côte d'Ivoire.

There is a local market for crafts, including pottery, cloth, and leather work. These products are not of a quality that can be traded much outside of the commune.

Fishing in the area is often done by Bozo people from neighboring regions who come to fish in the river Bogoe and sell their products in neighboring Niena.

The commune Wateni has two weekly markets: N'tjilla has a market every Wednesday and Bougoulaa has a market every Saturday.

The roads in the commune, except for the road connecting N'tjilla to Dougoukolobougou on the main paved road, are poorly maintained trails which are insufficient for transport in large vehicles.

The lines of communication between the villages are also poor due to erratic cell phone coverage. The road between N'tjilla and Dougoukolobougou is the only road that is passable during all seasons without difficulty. This 7 km road was leveled, widened, and had drainage installed in 2004.

== Religion ==
Although Islam is the dominant religion, there are also Christians and Animists present.
