= Lobougoula =

- Commune and town
- Location in Mali
- Coordinates: 11°2′35″N 5°58′55″W
- Country: Mali
- Region: Sikasso Region
- Cercle: Sikasso Cercle

Area
  - Total: 1,418 km^{2} (547 sq mi)

Population (2009 census)
  - Total: 32,505
  - Density: 22.92/km^{2} (59.37/sq mi)
- Time zone: UTC+0 (GMT)

Lobougoula is a small town and rural commune in the Cercle of Sikasso in the Sikasso Region of southern Mali. The commune covers an area of 1418 square kilometers and includes the town and 31 villages. In the 2009 census it had a population of 32,505. The town of Lobougoula, the chef-lieu of the commune, is 49 km southwest of Sikasso.
