= Miria =

Miria may refer to:

- Miria, Mali
- Miria, Niger

Miria is also a female given name. In the Māori language, Mīria is a transliteration of the name Amelia. Notable people with the name include:

- Miria, Los Angeles-based singer-songwriter
- Miria Contreras (1927–2002)
- Miria Flavell, New Zealand entrepreneur
- Miria Fujita (born 1998), Japanese idol and former member of Fairies (Japanese group)
- Mīria George (born 1980), New Zealand writer, producer and director
- Miria Matembe (born 1953), Ugandan lawyer and politician
- Miria Obote (born 1936), Ugandan politician
- Miria Pomare (1877–1971), New Zealand community leader
- Miria Watanabe, (born 1999), Japanese idol and former member of Nogizaka46

== See also ==
- myria-, an obsolete metric prefix.
