= Dembela =

- Commune and town
- Location in Mali
- Coordinates: 11°43′40″N 6°21′40″W
- Country: Mali
- Region: Sikasso Region
- Cercle: Sikasso Cercle

Area
  - Total: 426 km^{2} (164 sq mi)

Population (2009 census)
  - Total: 13,061
  - Density: 30.7/km^{2} (79.4/sq mi)
- Time zone: UTC+0 (GMT)

Dembela is a small town and rural commune in the Cercle of Sikasso in the Sikasso Region of southern Mali. The commune covers an area of 426 square kilometers and includes 11 villages. In the 2009 census it had a population of 13,061. The village of Dembela, the chef-lieu of the commune, is 88 km northwest of Sikasso.
