= Kiffosso =

Kiffosso I
- Commune and village
- Location in Mali
- Coordinates: 12°30′15″N 4°54′10″W
- Country: Mali
- Region: Sikasso Region
- Cercle: Yorosso Cercle

Area
  - Total: 446 km^{2} (172 sq mi)

Population (2009 census)
  - Total: 15,502
  - Density: 34.8/km^{2} (90.0/sq mi)
- Time zone: UTC+0 (GMT)

Kiffosso I is a village and rural commune in the Cercle of Yorosso in the Sikasso Region of southern Mali. The commune covers an area of 446 square kilometers and includes 10 villages. In the 2009 census it had a population of 15,502. The village of Kiffosso I, the administrative center (chef-lieu) of the commune, is 21 km northeast of Yorosso.
