= Kapolondougou =

- Commune
- Location in Mali
- Coordinates: 11°21′35″N 6°6′50″W
- Country: Mali
- Region: Sikasso Region
- Cercle: Sikasso Cercle

Area
  - Total: 526 km^{2} (203 sq mi)

Population (2009 census)
  - Total: 12,605
  - Density: 24.0/km^{2} (62.1/sq mi)
- Time zone: UTC+0 (GMT)

Kapolondougou is a rural commune in the Cercle of Sikasso in the Sikasso Region of southern Mali. The commune covers an area of 526 square kilometers and includes 19 villages. In the 2009 census it had a population of 12,605. The main village (chef-lieu) is N'Kourala. It lies 50 km west of Sikasso on the main road, the RN7, linking Sikasso and Bougouni.
