= Danderesso =

- Commune and town
- Location in Mali
- Coordinates: 11°29′12″N 5°28′55″W
- Country: Mali
- Region: Sikasso Region
- Cercle: Sikasso Cercle

Area
  - Total: 1,645 km^{2} (635 sq mi)

Population (2009 census)
  - Total: 41,723
  - Density: 25.36/km^{2} (65.69/sq mi)
- Time zone: UTC+0 (GMT)

Danderesso is a small town and rural commune in the Cercle of Sikasso in the Sikasso Region of southern Mali. The commune covers an area of 1,645 square kilometers and includes the town and 30 villages. In the 2009 census it had a population of 41,723. The town of Danderesso, the chef-lieu of the commune, is 28 km northeast of Sikasso.
