= Missirikoro =

- Commune and village
- Location in Mali
- Coordinates: 11°15′55″N 5°45′25″W
- Country: Mali
- Region: Sikasso Region
- Cercle: Sikasso Cercle

Area
  - Total: 132 km^{2} (51 sq mi)

Population (2009 census)
  - Total: 2,007
- Time zone: UTC+0 (GMT)

Missirikoro is a village and rural commune in the Cercle of Sikasso in the Sikasso Region of southern Mali. The commune covers an area of 132 square kilometers and includes 9 small villages. In the 2009 census it had a population of 2007. The village of Missirikoro, the administrative center (chef-lieu) of the commune, is 12 km southwest of Sikasso.
