= Tella (disambiguation) =

Tella is traditional beer of Ethiopia.

Tella may also refer to:

- Tella (Osrhoene), an ancient town of Osrhoene, now in Turkey
- Tella, Algeria, a commune in Algeria
- Tella, India, a village in India
- Tella, Mali, a commune in Mali
- Tella, Turkey, a town in Turkey
- Nathan Tella, English footballer
- Tella is the name of a privacy app for iOS and Android smartphones designed by Horizontal
