= Koumbia, Mali =

Koumbia
- Commune and village
- Location in Mali
- Coordinates: 12°35′45″N 4°41′25″W
- Country: Mali
- Region: Sikasso Region
- Cercle: Yorosso Cercle

Area
  - Total: 719 km^{2} (278 sq mi)

Population (2009 census)
  - Total: 24,915
  - Density: 34.7/km^{2} (89.7/sq mi)
- Time zone: UTC+0 (GMT)

Koumbia is a village and commune in the Cercle of Yorosso in the Sikasso Region of southern Mali. The commune covers an area of 719 square kilometers and includes 11 villages. In the 2009 census it had a population of 24,915. The village of Koumbia, the administrative center (chef-lieu) of the commune, is 28 km north-northeast of Yorosso.
