= Sokourani-Missirikoro =

- Commune and village
- Location in Mali
- Coordinates: 11°14′0″N 5°45′10″W
- Country: Mali
- Region: Sikasso Region
- Cercle: Sikasso Cercle
- Admin HQ (Chef-lieu): Sokourani-Missirikoro

Area
  - Total: 88 km^{2} (34 sq mi)

Population (2009 census)
  - Total: 4,478
  - Density: 51/km^{2} (130/sq mi)
  - Ethnicities: Senufo
- Time zone: UTC+0 (GMT)

Sokourani-Missirikoro is a village and rural commune in the Cercle of Sikasso in the Sikasso Region of southern Mali. The commune covers an area of 88 square kilometers and includes five villages. In the 2009 census it had a population of 4,478. The village of Sokourani-Missirikoro, the administrative center (chef-lieu) of the commune, is 13 km southwest of Sikasso. The main language spoken in the commune is Senufo.
