= Kabarasso =

- Commune and village
- Location in Mali
- Coordinates: 12°0′42″N 5°56′10″W
- Country: Mali
- Region: Sikasso Region
- Cercle: Sikasso Cercle

Area
  - Total: 255 km^{2} (98 sq mi)

Population (2009 census)
  - Total: 6,687
  - Density: 26.2/km^{2} (67.9/sq mi)
- Time zone: UTC+0 (GMT)

Kabarasso is a village and rural commune in the Cercle of Sikasso in the Sikasso Region of southern Mali. The commune covers an area of 255 square kilometers and includes 11 villages. In the 2009 census it had a population of 6,687. The village of Kabarasso, the chef-lieu of the commune, is 83 km north-northwest of Sikasso.
