= Kourouma =

- Commune and village
- Location in Mali
- Coordinates: 11°52′50″N 5°50′15″W
- Country: Mali
- Region: Sikasso Region
- Cercle: Sikasso Cercle

Area
  - Total: 293 km^{2} (113 sq mi)

Population (2009 census)
  - Total: 11,234
  - Density: 38.3/km^{2} (99.3/sq mi)
- Time zone: UTC+0 (GMT)

Kourouma is a village and rural commune in the Cercle of Sikasso in the Sikasso Region of southern Mali. The commune covers an area of 293 square kilometers and includes 10 villages. In the 2009 census, it had a population of 11,234. The village of Kourouma, the chef-lieu of the commune, is 81 km northwest of Sikasso.
