= Gongasso =

- Commune and village
- Location in Mali
- Coordinates: 11°31′50″N 5°47′47″W
- Country: Mali
- Region: Sikasso Region
- Cercle: Sikasso Cercle

Area
  - Total: 378 km^{2} (146 sq mi)

Population (2009 census)
  - Total: 8,465
  - Density: 22.4/km^{2} (58.0/sq mi)
- Time zone: UTC+0 (GMT)

Gongasso is a village and rural commune in the Cercle of Sikasso in the Sikasso Region of southern Mali. The commune covers an area of 378 square kilometers and includes ten villages. In the 2009 census it had a population of 8465. The village of Gongasso lies 29 km northwest of Sikasso on the main road, the RN11, linking Sikasso and Koutiala.
