= Miria, Mali =

Miria
- Commune
- Location in Mali
- Coordinates: 11°40′30″N 6°10′0″W
- Country: Mali
- Region: Sikasso Region
- Cercle: Sikasso Cercle

Area
  - Total: 231 km^{2} (89 sq mi)

Population (2009 census)
  - Total: 8,226
  - Density: 35.6/km^{2} (92.2/sq mi)
- Time zone: UTC+0 (GMT)

Miria is a commune in the Cercle of Sikasso in the Sikasso Region of southern Mali. The principal town lies at Doumanani. The commune covers an area of 231 square kilometers and includes five villages. In the 2009 census it had a population of 8,226. The village of Doumanani, the administrative center (chef-lieu) of the commune, is 68 km northwest of Sikasso.
