= Tella, Mali =

Tella
- Commune and village
- Location in Mali
- Coordinates: 11°47′0″N 6°15′5″W
- Country: Mali
- Region: Sikasso Region
- Cercle: Sikasso Cercle

Area
  - Total: 511 km^{2} (197 sq mi)

Population (2009 census)
  - Total: 4,372
  - Density: 8.56/km^{2} (22.2/sq mi)
- Time zone: UTC+0 (GMT)

Tella is a village and rural commune in the Cercle of Sikasso in the Sikasso Region of southern Mali. The commune covers an area of 511 square kilometers and includes six villages. In the 2009 census it had a population of 4,372. The village of Tella, the administrative center (chef-lieu) of the commune, is 82 km northwest of Sikasso.
