= Niéna =

Rural commune and town in Sikasso Region, Mali

- Commune and town
- Location in Mali
- Coordinates: 11°25′33″N 6°21′0″W
- Country: Mali
- Region: Sikasso Region
- Cercle: Sikasso Cercle

Area
  - Total: 1,040 km^{2} (400 sq mi)

Population (2009 census)
  - Total: 32,265
  - Density: 31.0/km^{2} (80.4/sq mi)
- Time zone: UTC+0 (GMT)

Niéna is a small town and rural commune in the Cercle of Sikasso in the Sikasso Region of southern Mali. The commune covers an area of 1,040 square kilometers and includes the town and 42 villages. In the 2009 census it had a population of 32,265. The town is the administrative center (chef-lieu) of the commune. It is 76 km west of Sikasso on the RN7, the main road linking Sikasso and Bougouni.
