= Banankoni =

Natural watercourse in Sikasso Region, Mali

Banankoni Baninko
- A tea plantation with dense shrubs and trees, Banankoni, Mali, 1972

- Banankoni in Mali.
- Native name: Banankoni Rivière (French)

Basin features
- Elevation 304 m: Geonames 2460534

The Banankoni River in Mali is located in the Sikasso Region, in the southern part of the country, 280 km east of Bamako. Banankoni is part of the Niger River drainage basin.
