= Malamine Koné =

Malian and French entrepreneur (born 1971)

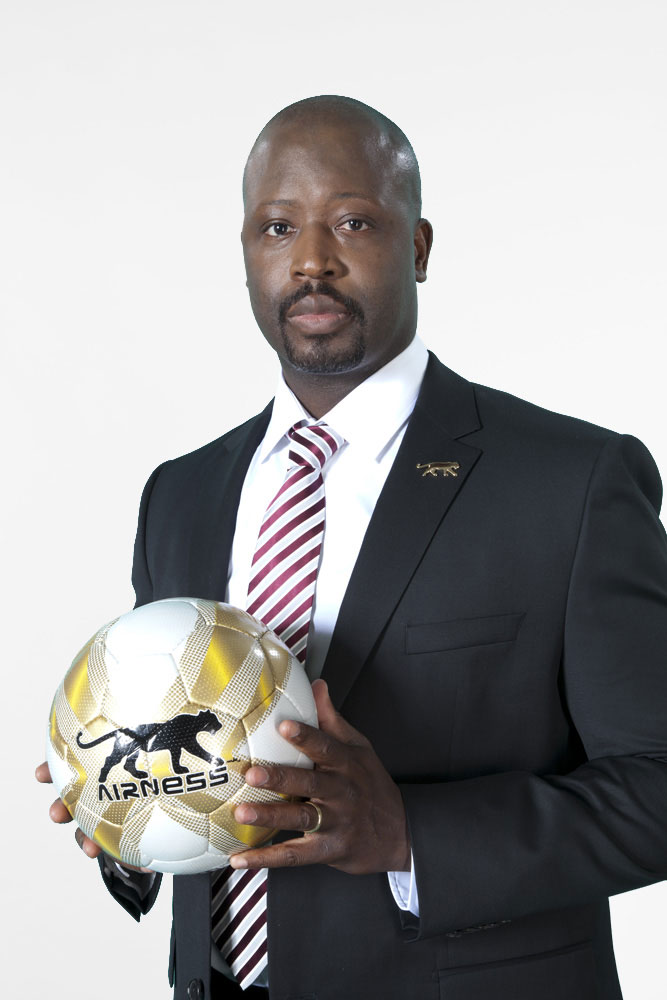
- Malamine Koné in 2022
- Born: December 21, 1971 (age 54); Niéna, Mali
- Occupation: Fashion designer
- Known for: Airness

Malamine Koné (December 21, 1971 in Niéna, Mali) is a Malian and French entrepreneur. He is the founder of the sportswear brand Airness. Koné arrived in France at the age of 10 and was raised in the northern Paris suburb of Saint-Denis. Koné became a boxer but his boxing career was cut short after a road accident in 1995. Koné then turned his attention to the fashion business.
