= Kignan =

- Commune and town
- Location in Mali
- Coordinates: 11°51′4″N 6°0′55″W
- Country: Mali
- Region: Sikasso Region
- Cercle: Sikasso Cercle

Area
  - Total: 646 km^{2} (249 sq mi)

Population (2009 census)
  - Total: 33,962
  - Density: 52.6/km^{2} (136/sq mi)
- Time zone: UTC+0 (GMT)

Kignan is a small town and rural commune in the Cercle of Sikasso in the Sikasso Region of southern Mali. The commune covers an area of 646 square kilometers and includes the town and 14 villages. As of the 2009 census it had a population of 33,962. The town of Kignan is 77 km northwest of Sikasso on the R20 road that links Sikasso to Fana.
