= Yorosso Cercle =

Coordinates: 12°20′N 4°45′W

- Cercle
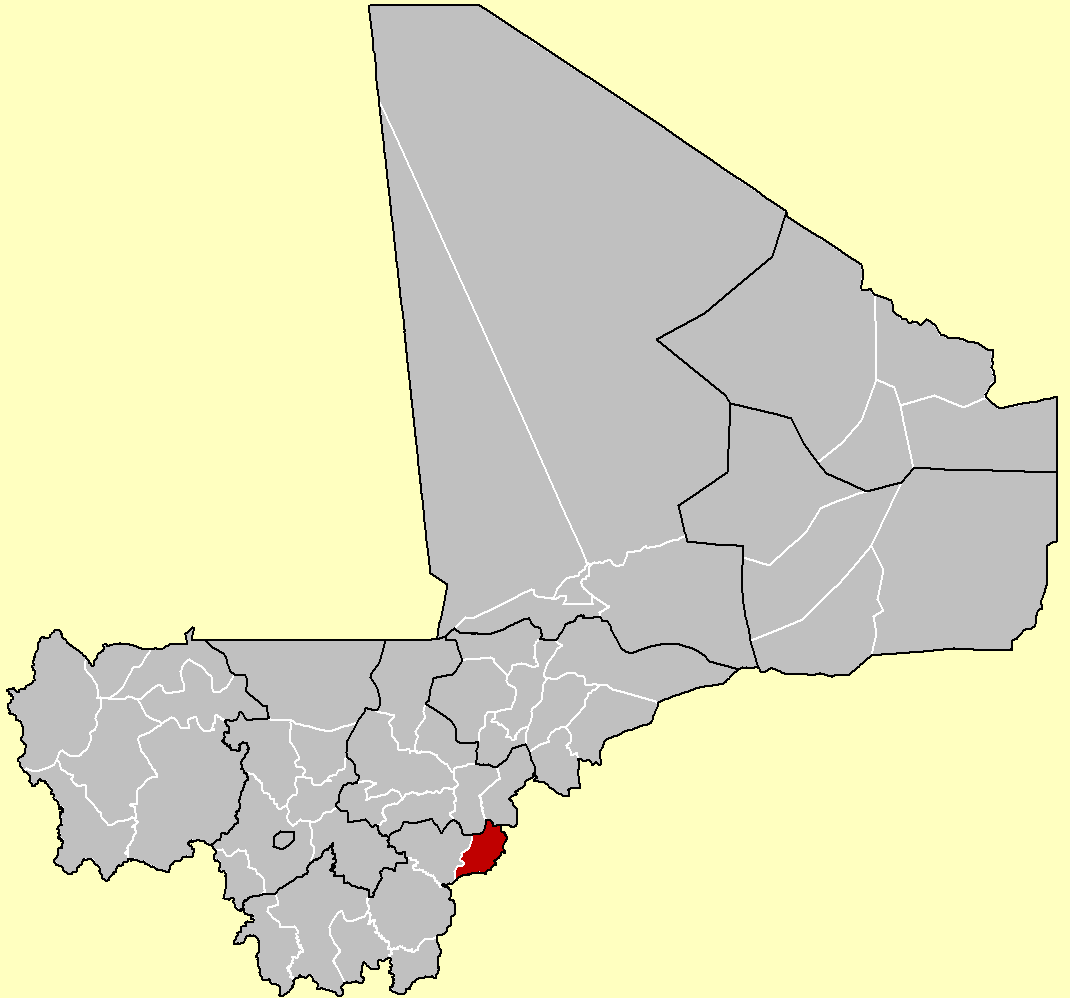
- Location of the Cercle of Yorosso in Mali
- Country: Mali
- Region: Sikasso Region
- Admin HQ (Chef-lieu): Yorosso

Area
  - Total: 5,500 km^{2} (2,100 sq mi)

Population (2009 census)
  - Total: 211,508
  - Density: 38/km^{2} (100/sq mi)
- Time zone: UTC+0 (GMT)

Yorosso Cercle is an administrative subdivision of the Sikasso Region of southern Mali. The main town (chef-lieu) is Yorosso.

The cercle is divided into nine rural communes:

- Boura
- Karangana
- Kiffosso I
- Koumbia
- Koury
- Mahou
- Ménamba I
- Ourikéla
- Yorosso
