= Tieba Traoré =

Tieba Traore
- Faama
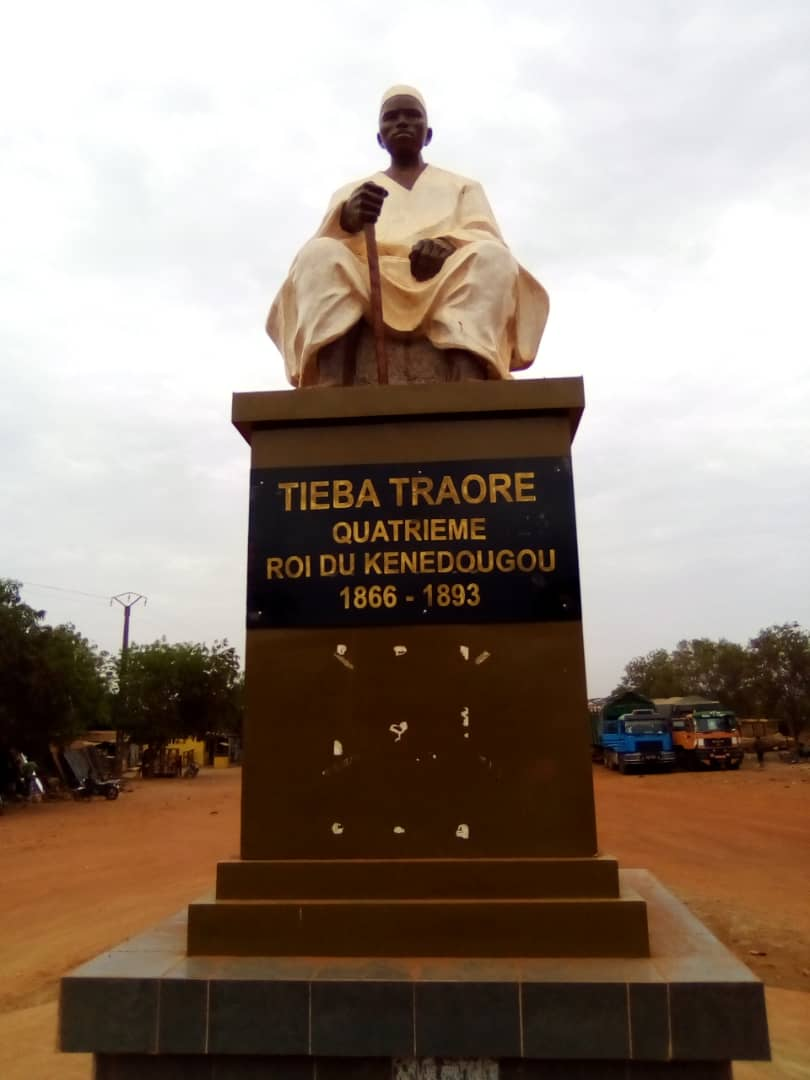
- A statue of Tieba Traore in Sikasso
- Reign: 1877-1893
- Predecessor: Mansa Douala
- Successor: Babemba Traore
- Born: c. 1845
- Died: 27 January 1893 (aged 47–48); Bama

Tieba Traoré was the fourth king of the Kénédougou Kingdom, reigning from 1877 until his death in 1893.

Mansa Douala had five sons, of whom Tieba was the youngest. As a prince he was captured after the battle of Bleni against the Bobo and Dyula, who held him for ransom. When Douala died, Tieba managed to have himself proclaimed king over his elder brothers after a pair of military victories near Djitamana and Tiere.

Traoré founded a new royal capital of Sikasso, building a palace on the city's Mamelon hill. He also constructed the celebrated Tata of Sikasso.

Kenedougou's conflict with the expanding Wassoulou Empire of Samori Ture began in 1884 when Tieba sent his brother Siaka to reinforce the frontier between the two kingdoms at the Bagoe River. The region soon became a depopulated battleground.

He generally maintained an alliance with the French against Samori, who besieged Sikasso for 15 months in 1887-8 before a French column rescued the city. In the aftermath, Tieba signed a treaty of alliance with the French, and even accompanied French Colonel Louis Archinard to witness the destruction of Ségou in 1890. Louis-Gustave Binger, a French officer who met Tieba in 1888, described him as a very intelligent man, generally wearing white and accompanied by his wife at audiences and council meetings. His generosity was legendary.

Tieba fought successful wars against Bobo-Dioulasso and the Kong Empire, but died by poison on January 27, 1893, near Bama during one of these campaigns. His brother Babemba Traoré succeeded him.
