= Babemba Traoré =

Babemba
- Faama
- Reign: 1893-1898
- Predecessor: Tieba Traore
- Successor: Position abolished
- Died: 1 May 1898; Sikasso
- Father: Mansa Douala

Babemba was the fifth and final Faama of the Kénédougou Kingdom, ruling from the 1893 death of his brother Tieba Traoré until the capture of Sikasso by the French in 1898. He is today remembered as a hero of anti-colonial resistance in Mali.

== Reign ==
As he assumed the throne, Babemba faced both an expanding Wassoulou Empire under Samori Ture and an aggressive French colonial army that was in the process of conquering what remained of the Toucouleur Empire. He chose to maintain the relatively close relationship that his brother had established with the French, and expanded Kenedougou territory into modern-day Burkina Faso and Ivory Coast.

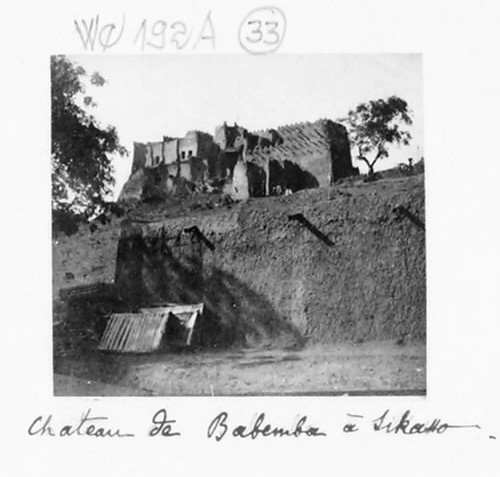
Babemba's citadel in Sikasso

By 1898 the French had succeeded in conquering much of Samori Ture's empire and turned their attention to Sikasso. The colonel Audeoud, temporary French commander of French Sudan, was seeking a new military victory to enhance his reputation. He sent a commission to Sikasso to establish a French garrison there, a humiliatian that Babemba categorically refused. He expelled the commission, stopped paying the yearly tribute and, according to French sources, sent troops to attack them on the way back to Bamako.

The French responded with an invasion, beginning a major artillery barrage against Sikasso's walls on April 15, 1898. The defenders' fierce sallies were unable to drive the besiegers away, and the city fell on May 1 amid furious house-to-house fighting. Babemba, wounded during the defense of the citadel, ordered his bodyguards to kill him, an action still celebrated in Mali today. Sikasso was sacked, with 4000 captives taken and shared as slaves among the victorious soldiers, both conscripted Africans and Europeans.

== Legacy ==
The stadium of Sikasso, Stade Babemba , today bears his name. There is also a statue of him, as well as another of his brother, in the city.

== See also ==
- Samori Ture
- Kenedougou Kingdom
