= Airness =

French sportswear brand

- Type: Private
- Industry: Textile
- Founded: 1999; 27 years ago
- Headquarters: Saint-Denis, France
- Key people: Malamine Koné, founder
- Products: Apparel, footwear
- Website: www.airness.fr

Airness is a footwear trademark founded in 1999 in Saint-Denis, France, by Malamine Koné. The logo includes the image of a black panther.

== History ==
Malamine Koné, a former boxer from the 1990s nicknamed 'the panther', founded the brand Airness in 1998. He was inspired by emerging brands in the rap scene, such as M.Dia, Bullrot, and Com8, and chose the panther as his emblem. He presented his brand to various distributors, and a first retail location in Aulnay-sous-Bois began selling his products.

In 2003, Airness signed an agreement with Groupe Hamelin to distribute school products featuring the brand. In 2004, Airness became the kit supplier for Stade Rennais Football Club for the 2004–2005 season, in partnership with Uhlsport.

In 2010, the Paris High Court ordered the company to pay €15,000 in damages to the brand Cikatrice for copyright infringement and unfair competition.

== Sponsorships ==
Teams and athletes using Airness equipment are:

=== Basketball ===
==== Previous club teams ====
- (France) SLUC Nancy

=== Football ===
==== National teams ====
- Brittany (since 2013)

==== Previous national teams ====
- Benin (2008–2014)
- (Democratic Republic of the Congo) DR Congo (2006–2009)
- (Republic of the Congo) Congo (2006–2007)
- Gabon (2010)
- Mali (2006-2026)

==== Previous club teams ====
- (Belgium) KRC Genk
- (England) Fulham
- (France) Auxerre
- (France) Lille
- (France) Nantes
- (France) Rennes
- (France) Le Havre

=== Rugby Union ===
- (Canada) Toronto Jazz

=== Tennis ===
==== Previous tennis players ====
- (Russia) Nikolay Davydenko
