= Kénédougou Kingdom =

West African pre-colonial state (c. 1650–1898)

Kénédougou Kingdom Fǎngi Kenedugu
- c. 1650–1898
- West Africa in 1875
- Status: Kingdom
- Capital: Bougoula (?–1877); Sikasso (1877–1898)
- Government: Monarchy
- Faama
  - (first): Nanka Traoré
  - (1876–1893): Tieba Traoré
  - (1893–1898): Babemba Traoré
- Historical era: Early modern period
  - Established: c. 1650
  - Established independence from Kong Empire: 1825
  - Fall of Sikasso: 1 May 1898
Preceded by	Succeeded by
Kong Empire	French Sudan / (French Sudan)
- Today part of: Mali; Côte d'Ivoire; Burkina Faso

The Kénédougou Kingdom, (Cebaara Senufo: Fǎngi Kenedugu), (c. 1650–1898) was a pre-colonial West African state established in the southeastern portion of present-day Mali, as well as parts of northern Côte d'Ivoire and western Burkina Faso.

== Early history ==
Kénédougou, meaning 'country of the plain', was first established in the 17th century by the Dioula Traore clan. The new kingdom, mostly inhabited by the Senufo people, was conveniently located to dominate the exchange of desert and forest goods. However, the Senoufo traditionalist practices put them at odds with the Muslims to their north. Kenedougou adopted some Mandé practices such as the royal title of faama.

=== Legendary Origins of the Traoré dynasty ===
According to legend, the Traoré family originated in Gbotola near Kankan in what is now Guinea. A local seer predicted that, were they to sacrifice their aunt and go east, they would establish a powerful dynasty. They refused to kill their relative for ambition, even as other passing seers repeated the same prophecy. One day the aunt in question was told about the prophecy. In order to benefit her family, she prepared herself for sacrifice and committed suicide. When the family heard the news they buried the aunt and traveled east.

=== Under Kong ===
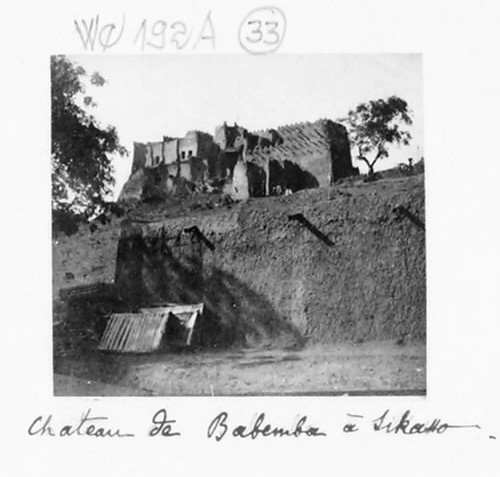
The Castle/Citadel of the kingdom at Sikasso

Nanka Traoré became Kénédougou's first ruler and began the Traoré dynasty, which would last into the late 19th century. There is little information about the kingdom's formative years, and approximately five to seven famas ruled between the foundation of the dynasty and Fama Douala Ba. Kénédougou's existence was marked by relative peace compared to neighboring states of the period.

In the 18th century, Kénédougou was a far-flung extension of the Kong Empire. By 1825, Kong power had declined in the region and the kingdom, under the rule of Doaula Ba Traoré, was able to establish independence.

== 19th Century ==
During much of the 19th century, Kenedougou was at war with Bobo-Dioulasso and their former overlords in Kong. Faama Daoula Traore (r. 1840-1877) expanded his holdings at their expense and consolidated administrative control. He died in 1877, and was succeeded by his son Tieba.

=== Tieba ===
During this period, Kenedougou faced a double threat as French colonial forces and Samori Toure began swallowing up commercial partners in the south, west and east. Faama Tieba moved the capital of the kingdom from Bougoula to his mother's home city of Sikasso in 1877. There he built a new palace on a strategic hill called the Mamelon and a massive city wall, the Tata of Sikasso, which remains a tourist attraction today.

Kenedougou's conflict with Toure's Wassoulou Empire began in 1884 when Tieba sent his brother Siaka to reinforce the frontier between the two kingdoms at the Bagoe River. The region soon became a depopulated battleground. Tieba also conquered the Minianka region.

Samori attacked Sikasso with an army of 12,000 men in April 1887, and laid siege to the city for 15 months, but failed to take it before a French column rescued the city. In the aftermath, Tieba signed a treaty of alliance with the French. He continued to campaign to the east, but was poisoned and died near Bama in January 1893.

=== Babemba ===
Following Tieba's death, his brother Babemba Traoré assumed the throne, later expanding Kenedougou territory into modern-day Burkina Faso and Ivory Coast. He maintained the relationship with France, but in 1898 stopped sending the annual tribute and expelled and attacked the French ambassador.

The French launched an artillery assault against Sikasso's tata on April 15th 1898, and the city fell on May 1. Rather than see the French take control of his city, Faama Babemba ordered his guards to kill him.

== Legacy ==
Kénédougou was one of the last major hold-outs against French ambitions in West Africa. The territory of the kingdom was assimilated into the colony of French Sudan, and later into the country of Mali.

The memory of Tieba and Babemba are still revered to this day in Mali as symbols of African resistance to the French.
