= Tata of Sikasso =

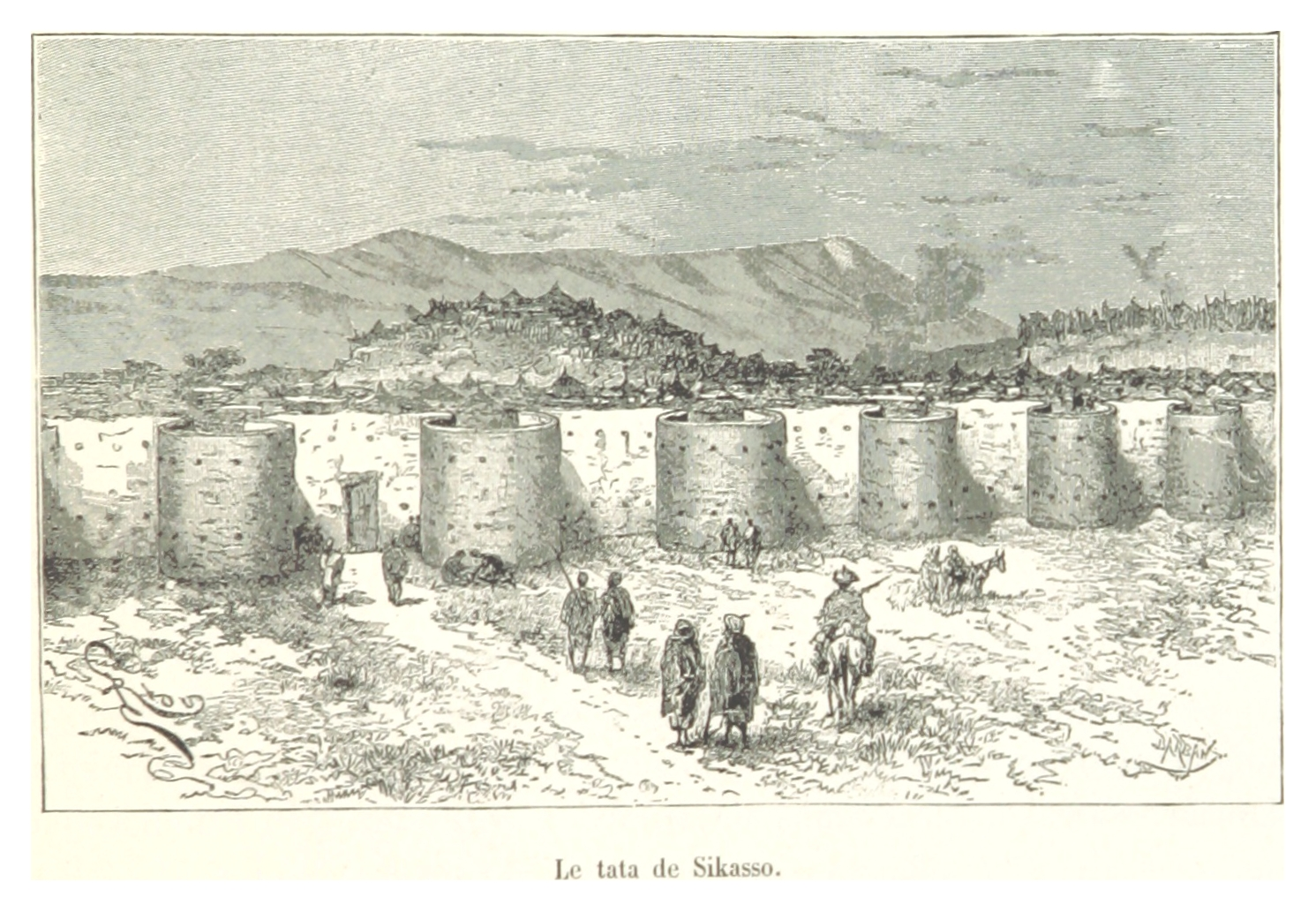
The tata of Sikasso, illustration by Édouard Riou published in Du Niger au golfe de Guinée (From Niger to the Gulf of Guinea), Hachette, 1892, by L.G Binger, p. 95

The tata of Sikasso, known locally as tarakoko, was a series of ramparts initially constructed in Sikasso under the reign of Tiéba Traoré (king of Kénédougou), from 1877 to 1897, to resist the raids of Samory Touré. It was later enlarged by his brother and successor Babemba Traoré.

== Description ==
At its apogee, the tata consisted of :

- An exterior fortress of 9 km (5.6 mi), 6 metres (20 ft) thick at the base and 2 metres (6 ft 7 in) at the top, with its height varying between 4 and 6 metres (13 and 20 ft);
- a middle fortress with smaller and thinner walls, intended to separate the neighborhoods for merchants, soldiers and nobles;
- an innermost enclosure encircling the Dionfoutou, the part of the city inhabited by the king and his family.

The walls, which were made of dry (unmortared) stone, gravel, and mud-brick, encircled an area of 41ha. The remains of the fortress are today visible in the layout of the city of Sikasso in different neighborhoods including: Mancourani, Médine, Wayerma, Bougoula town and Fulaso. and the districts Mancourani, Médine, Wayerma, Bougoula ville and Fulaso.

== See also ==
- Kénédougou Kingdom
- Mamelon of Sikasso
