= Miria Flavell =

New Zealand entrepreneur

Miria Flavell is an entrepreneur from New Zealand; she is Māori and belongs to the Taranaki and Ngāti Rangiwewehi iwi (tribes). In 2024, she won the product entrepreneur category in the New Zealand EY Entrepreneur of the Year competition.

After finishing high school, Flavell studied at a film and television school in Auckland, and worked in producing, editing, directing, wardrobe and production management. She eventually specliased in screen make-up and also worked as a self-employed make-up artist.

Flavell later completed a bachelor's degree in Māori development at Auckland University of Technology. In 2018, she and her partner founded a line of women's activewear, aiming to provide clothing for women of all shapes and sizes, from size XXS to 8XL. In 2022, she and her sister Matangiroa Flavell (a former Tall Fern) opened a gym together.
