= Tella, Bankura =

Tella Telna
- Village
- Location in West Bengal, India
- Coordinates: 23°8′44″N 87°11′10″E
- Country: India
- State: West Bengal
- District: Bankura

Area
  - Total: 5.5 km^{2} (2.1 sq mi)

Population (2015 census)
  - Total: 414
  - Density: 75/km^{2} (190/sq mi)
- Time zone: UTC+5.5 (GMT)

Tella (also called Telna) is a village in the Onda CD Block of Bankura district in West Bengal, India. Onda is the nearest town to Tella (1.5 km or 0.93 mi). Tella is known for its numerous ponds and lakes. While the smaller ones are privately owned, the larger ones are either owned by the community or open to the public.

== Demographics ==
A majority of the residents are Hindus. As of the 2011 census, 92 families resided in the village. Tella has a population of 414 of which 224 are males while 190 are females. People of different castes and creeds have been living harmoniously here for generations.

== Occupation ==
The main occupation of the villagers is farming. The main crops are kharif crops like rice, maize, etc., which are cultivated during the monsoon season when there is abundant water for irrigation. During the other times of the year, cash crops like betel leaves are cultivated, which is primarily reliant on water from the large ponds in the village for irrigation. Fishing is also an important source of livelihood and constitutes a primary part of the daily diet.

In recent years, many have migrated to other towns and cities in India in search of better livelihoods. Remittances from them have led to improved prosperity and living conditions.

== Transport ==
The village is next to National Highway NH 60 and is well connected to train network through the nearest railway stop at Ondagram railway station (2.5 km or 1.6 mi).

== Notable places ==
- At the entrance to the village at NH 60, there is an old Shiva Temple. The temple is believed to be constructed around 1960. It is the center of attraction and village activity during the Hindu religious festival of Mahashivaratri.
- Adjacent to the Shiva temple is the local school. It was constructed in early 1980 and was instrumental in imparting a primary education to the children of the village. The school served lunch to all the students as part of the government-sponsored mid-day meal scheme.

== Nearby villages ==
- Srirampur
- Kanaipur
- Panch Danna
- Kumar Danga
- Puthia
- Sadishta
- Chandrakona
- Raghunath Nagar
- Baharamuri
- Gopalpur
- Chak Krishnanagar Thakurbari
