= Mamelon of Sikasso =

Coordinates: 11°18′54″N 5°39′59″W

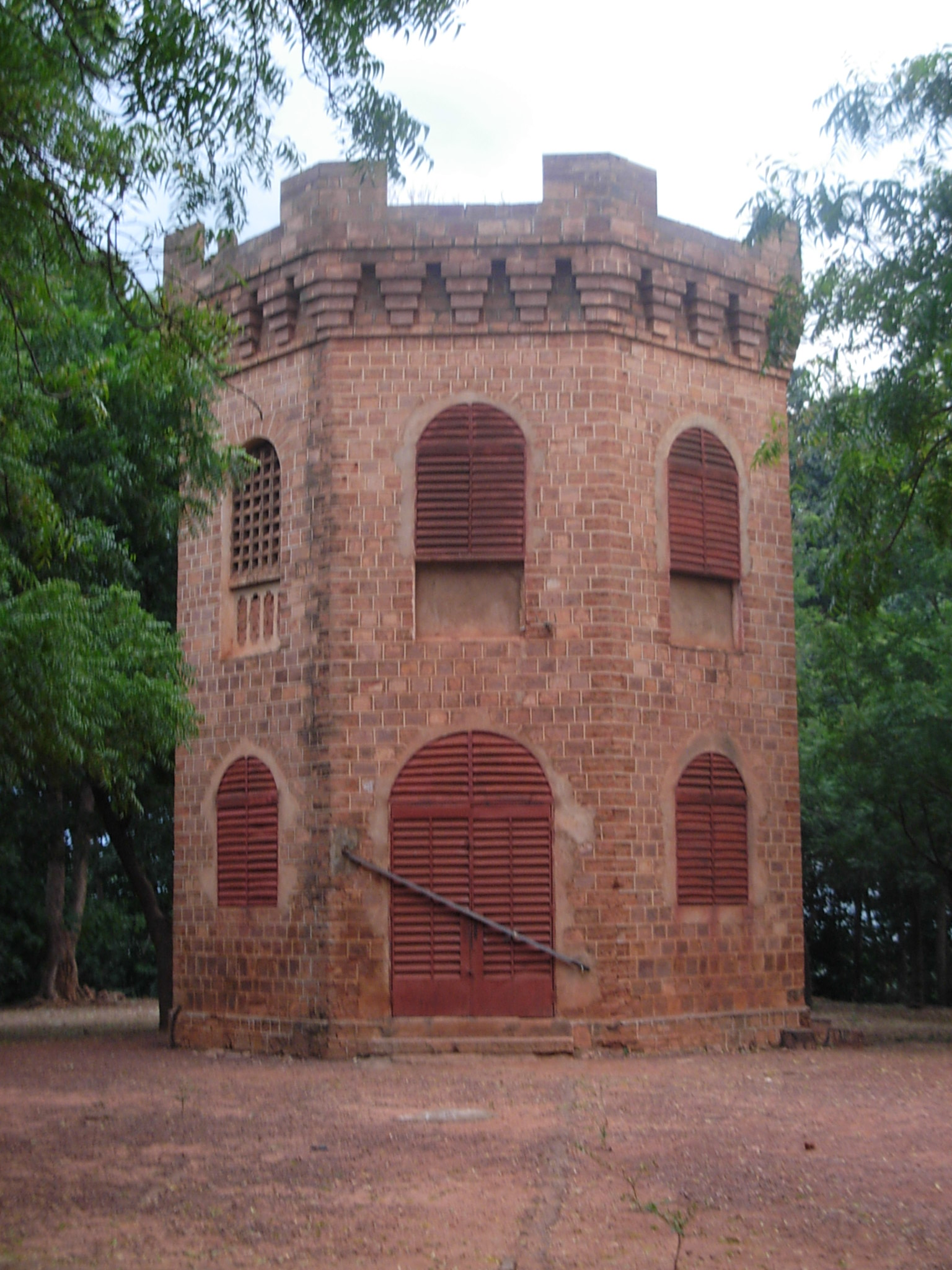

The mamelon of Sikasso is a mamelon 30 metres (98 ft) high, and 461 metres (1,512 ft) in circumference, located in the heart of Sikasso, Mali. It was built in the 1880s by the king of Kénédougou, Tiéba Traoré, for the kings to have their seat there.

At its summit, there is a replica of a fortified multistory structure which served as a place of work and as a traditional court, which was destroyed when Sikasso was conquered by the French colonizers.

== History ==
The site had traditionally been considered very important to local people. It was believed to be home to spirits, and has long been used as a gathering place, where court was held, guests were received and leaders observed the surrounding territory from the height.

Scholars have noted how the hill was used as a symbol of power by the Traoré dynasty, French colonists and more recently the Malian government.

On May 1, 1898, it was on the summit of the Mamelon that the French flag was flown for the first time in Sikasso.

It is located between the Town Hall to the west, the Banque Centrale des États de l'Afrique de l'Ouest (BCEAO) building to the east, the city courthouse to the south and the Boulevard de l’indépendance to the north.

Under madame N’diaye Ramatoulaye Diallo, then minister of Culture, Tourism and Trades, an agreement to help restore the monument was made between the local government and the World Bank through a program called Projet d’Appui aux Communes Urbaines du Mali (PACUM).

The platform or esplanade of the Mamelon, the staircase which leads up to them, the tribunes at the foot of the Mamelon on the North-east side and the space at the foot of the Mamelon in front of the City Hall are the objects of the present Restoration Project initiated by the City Hall of the Urban Commune of Sikasso and financed by the World Bank through Projet d’Appui aux Communes Urbaines du Mali (PACUM).

== See also ==
- Tata of Sikasso
