= Kofan, Mali =

Koetong
- Town
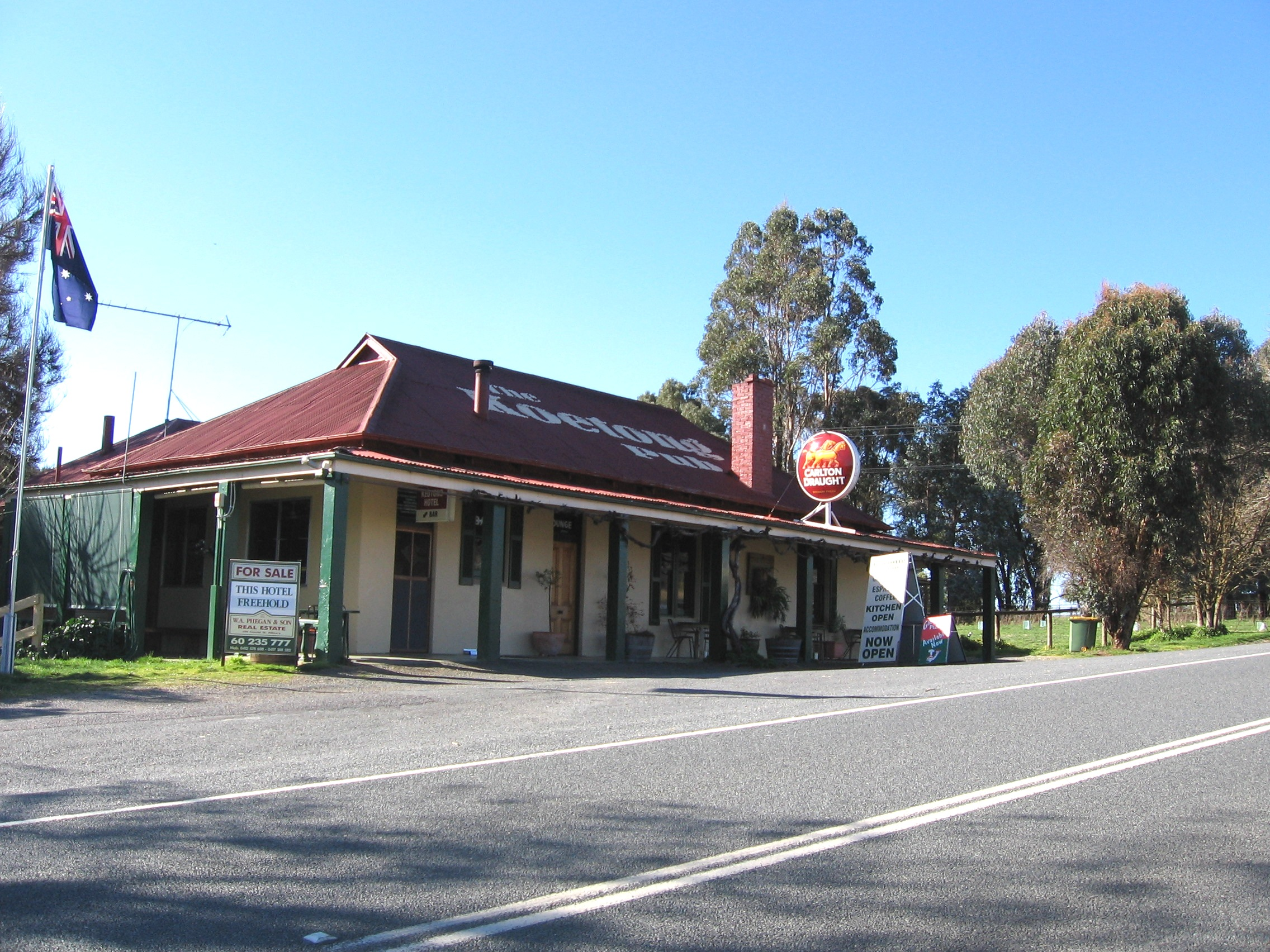
- The Koetong Pub on the Murray Valley Highway

- Coordinates: 36°09′S 147°30′E
- Country: Australia
- State: Victoria
- LGA: Shire of Towong
- Location: 394 km (245 mi) NE of Melbourne; 87 km (54 mi) E of Albury; 34 km (21 mi) E of Tallangatta; 48 km (30 mi) W of Corryong; 44 km (27 mi) WSW of Walwa

Government
  - State electorate: Benambra
  - Federal division: Indi
- Elevation: 607 m (1,991 ft)
- Postcode: 3704

Koetong is a locality in north-east Victoria, Australia. The locality, part of the Towong Shire local government area, is on the Murray Valley Highway between Tallangatta and Corryong, 394 kilometres (245 mi) north-east of the state capital, Melbourne, .

Koetong was surveyed in 1885 but not proclaimed until 1952. Tin and gold mining has been sporadically carried out in the area since 1873.

The local state school first opened in 1890 and after several temporary closures, closed permanently in 2003. The town is an access point to nearby Mount Lawson State Park.

== See also ==
- Koetong railway station
