= Bama Department =

Coordinates: 11.3738°N 4.4132°W

Bama
- Department
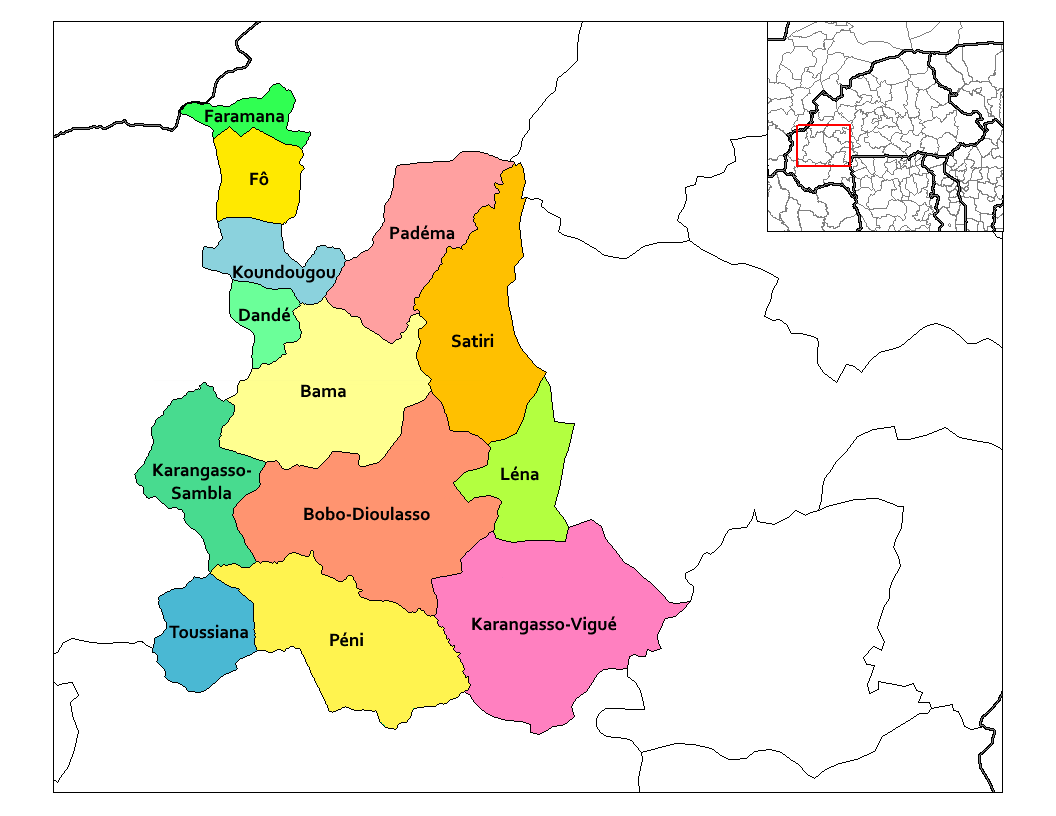
- Bama Department location in the province
- Country: Burkina Faso
- Region: Hauts-Bassins
- Province: Houet

Area
  - Total: 505 sq mi (1,308 km^{2})

Population (2019 census)
  - Total: 85,834
  - Density: 170.0/sq mi (65.62/km^{2})
- Time zone: UTC+0 (GMT 0)

Bama is a department or commune of Houet Province in south-western Burkina Faso. Its capital lies at the town of Bama.
