= Yorosso =

- Commune and town
- Location in Mali
- Coordinates: 12°21′20″N 4°46′40″W
- Country: Mali
- Region: Sikasso Region
- Cercle: Yorosso Cercle

Area
  - Total: 487 km^{2} (188 sq mi)

Population (2009 census)
  - Total: 22,063
  - Density: 45.3/km^{2} (117/sq mi)
- Time zone: UTC+0 (GMT)

Yorosso is a town and rural commune in the Yorosso Cercle, in the Sikasso Region of southern Mali. The town serves as the seat of the Yorosso Cercle. It lies 151 km northeast of Sikasso and 202 km southeast of Ségou. The commune covers an area of 487 square kilometers, and includes the Yorosso town and nine other surrounding villages. According to the 2009 census, it had a population of 22,063.
