= Sikasso Cercle =

Coordinates: 11°30′N 5°55′W

- Cercle
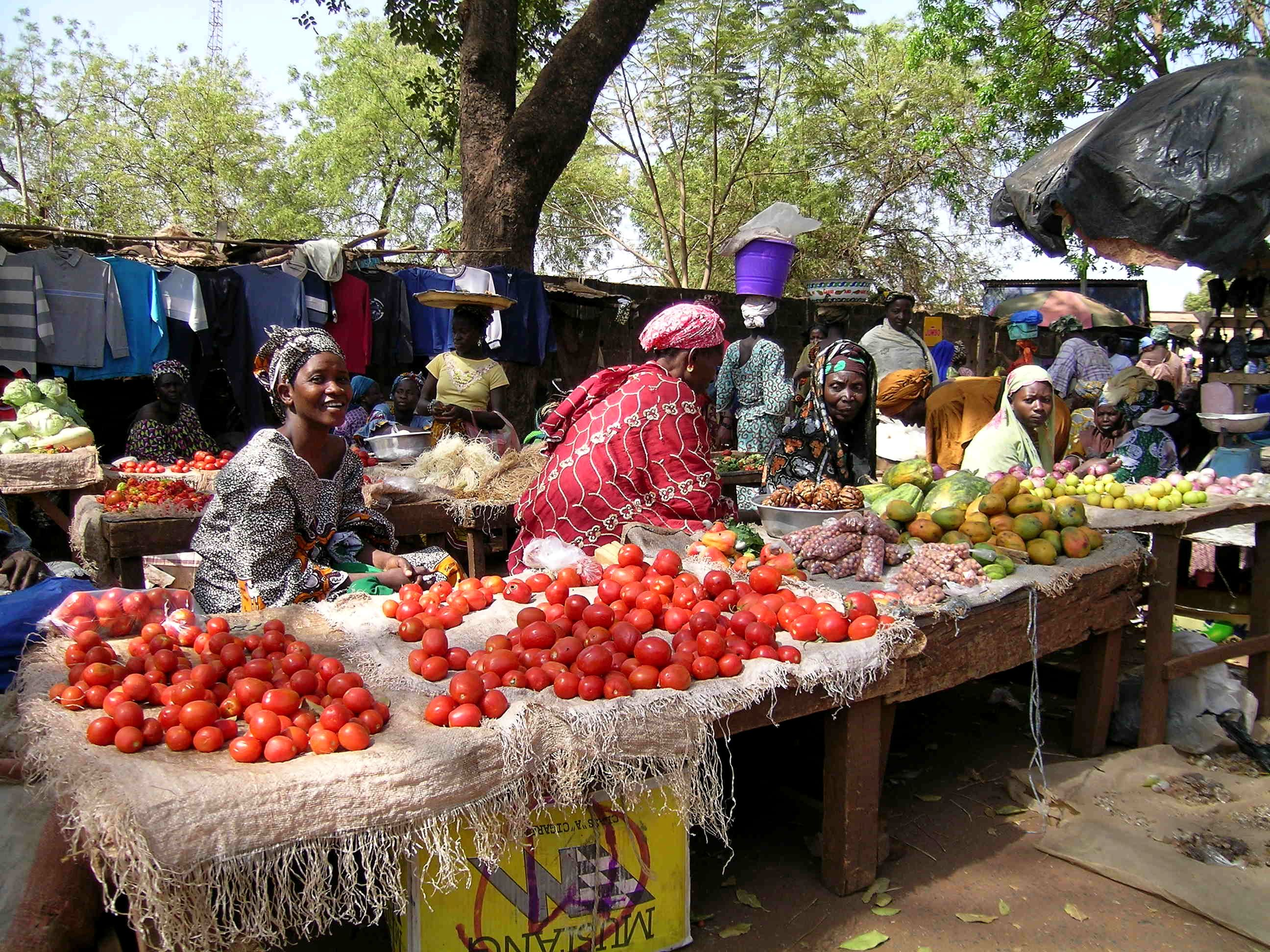

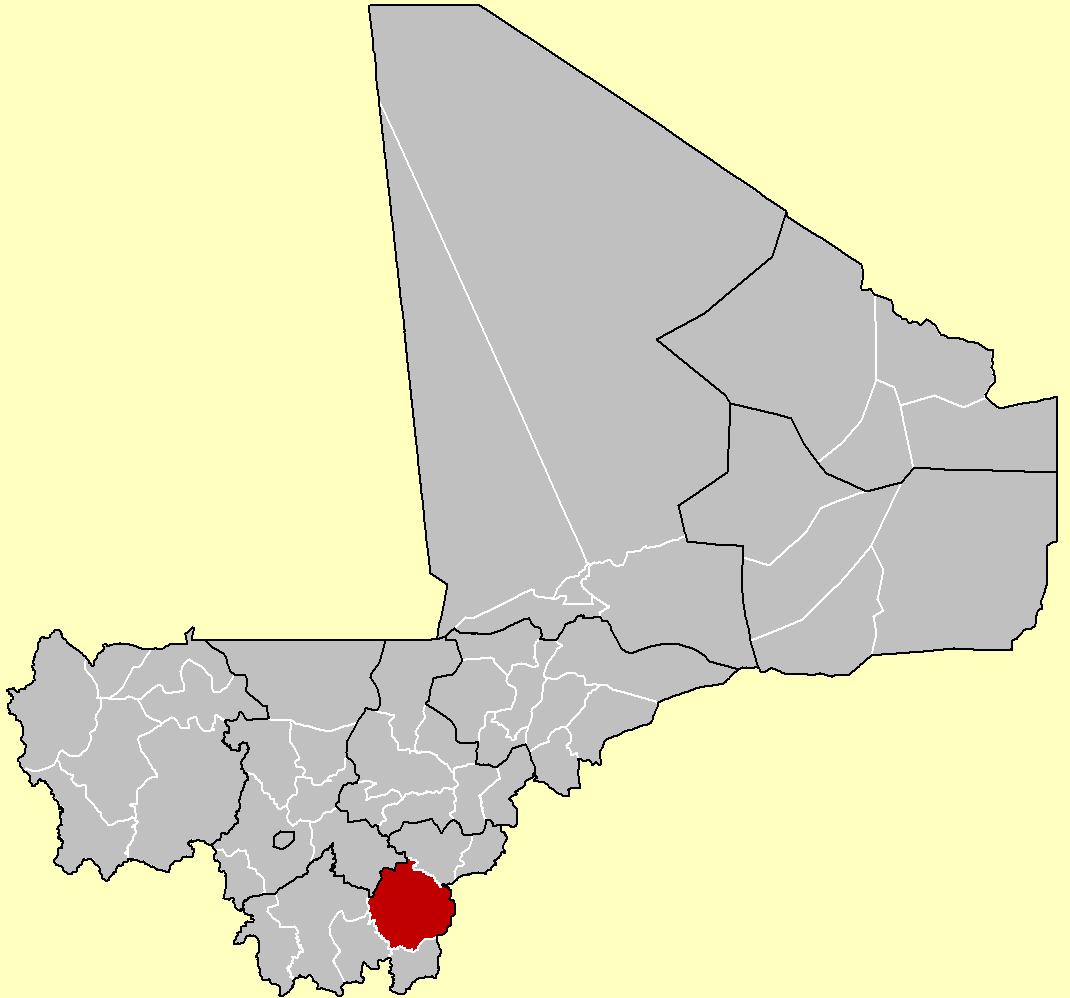
- Location of the Cercle of Sikasso in Mali
- Country: Mali
- Region: Sikasso Region
- Admin HQ (Chef-lieu): Sikasso

Area
  - Total: 15,375 km^{2} (5,936 sq mi)

Population (2009 census)
  - Total: 725,494
  - Density: 47.187/km^{2} (122.21/sq mi)
- Time zone: UTC+0 (GMT)

Sikasso Cercle is one of seven administrative subdivisions of the Sikasso Region of southern Mali. The capital is the town of Sikasso.

The cercle is divided into the urban commune of Sikasso and 42 rural communes:

- Benkadi
- Blendio
- Danderesso
- Dembela
- Dialakoro
- Diomaténé
- Dogoni
- Doumanaba
- Fama
- Farakala
- Finkolo
- Finkolo Ganadougou
- Gongasso
- Kabarasso
- Kaboïla
- Kafouziéla
- Kapala
- Kapolondougou
- Kignan
- Kléla
- Kofan
- Kolokoba
- Koumankou
- Kouoro
- Kourouma
- Lobougoula
- Miniko
- Miria
- Missirikoro
- N'Tjikouna
- Natien
- Niéna
- Nongo-Souala
- Pimperna
- Sanzana
- Sokourani-Missirikoro
- Tella
- Tiankadi
- Wateni
- Zanférébougou
- Zangaradougou
- Zaniéna

== Cities and populated places ==
- Sikasso
- Ténétou
