= Sikasso =

City and urban commune in Sikasso, Mali

- City and urban commune
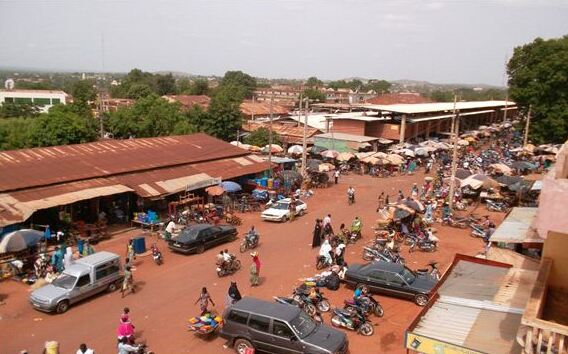
- Sikasso

- Location within Mali
- Coordinates: 11°19′N 5°40′W
- Country: Mali
- Region: Sikasso
- Cercle: Sikasso Cercle
- Settled as a village: c. 1800
- Established as the capital of the Kenedougou Kingdom: 1876
- Founder: Tieba Traore

Area
  - Total: 400 km^{2} (150 sq mi)
- Elevation: 410 m (1,350 ft)

Population (2009 census)
  - Total: 225,753
  - Density: 560/km^{2} (1,500/sq mi)
- Time zone: UTC+0 (GMT)

Sikasso (Bambara: ߛߌߞߊߛߏ߬; Sikasǒ) is a city in the south of Mali and the capital of the Sikasso Cercle and the Sikasso Region. It is Mali's second largest city with 225,753 residents in the 2009 census. The city is a large centre and trading port, and was the capital of the Kénédougou Kingdom between 1877 and 1898.

== History ==
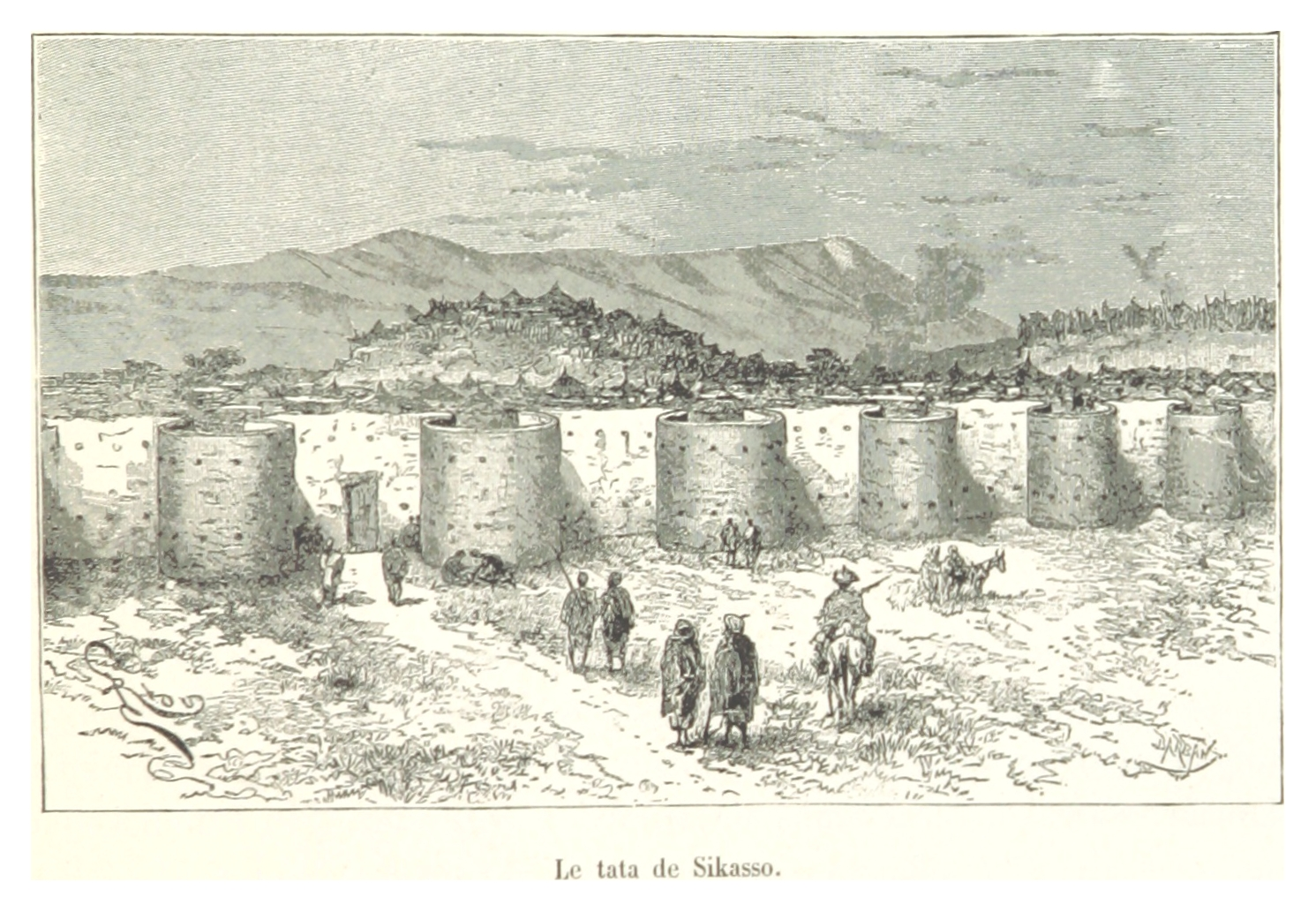
The Tata of Sikasso in 1892, drawn by Louis-Gustave Binger

Sikasso was a small village until 1870, when Tieba Traoré, whose mother came from Sikasso, became Faama of the Kénédougou Kingdom and moved the capital there. He established his palace on the sacred Mamelon hill (now home to a water tower) and constructed a massive tata to defend against the attacks of both the Malinke conqueror Samori Ture and the French colonial army. This made Sikasso the largest fortified city ever built in west Africa.

Sikasso withstood a 15-month siege by Ture from 1887 to 1888 before the French, allies of Kenedougou against Ture, relieved the city. Despite this, the French contrived a diplomatic crisis to attack in 1898. They began a major artillery barrage against the tata on April 15th 1898, and the city fell on May 1st amid furious house-to-house fighting. Babemba Traore, Tieba's brother who had succeeded him as faama, ordered his bodyguards to kill him rather than let him fall into French hands. He is still remembered for honoring the Bamanankan saying "Saya ka fisa ni maloya ye" (literally: death is preferable to shame). 4000 captives were taken from the sack and parcelled out as slaves among the French and their African auxiliaries. They were marched back west to the Niger, with many too weak or starved to continue dying or being killed along the way.

At the time of the French conquest, the city had around 30,000 inhabitants.

In modern-day Sikasso, attractions include the large market, Mamelon hill, the remains of Tieba Traoré's tata, and the nearby Missirikoro Grotto. The festival Triangle du balafon takes place every June, celebrating the traditional Malian instrument.

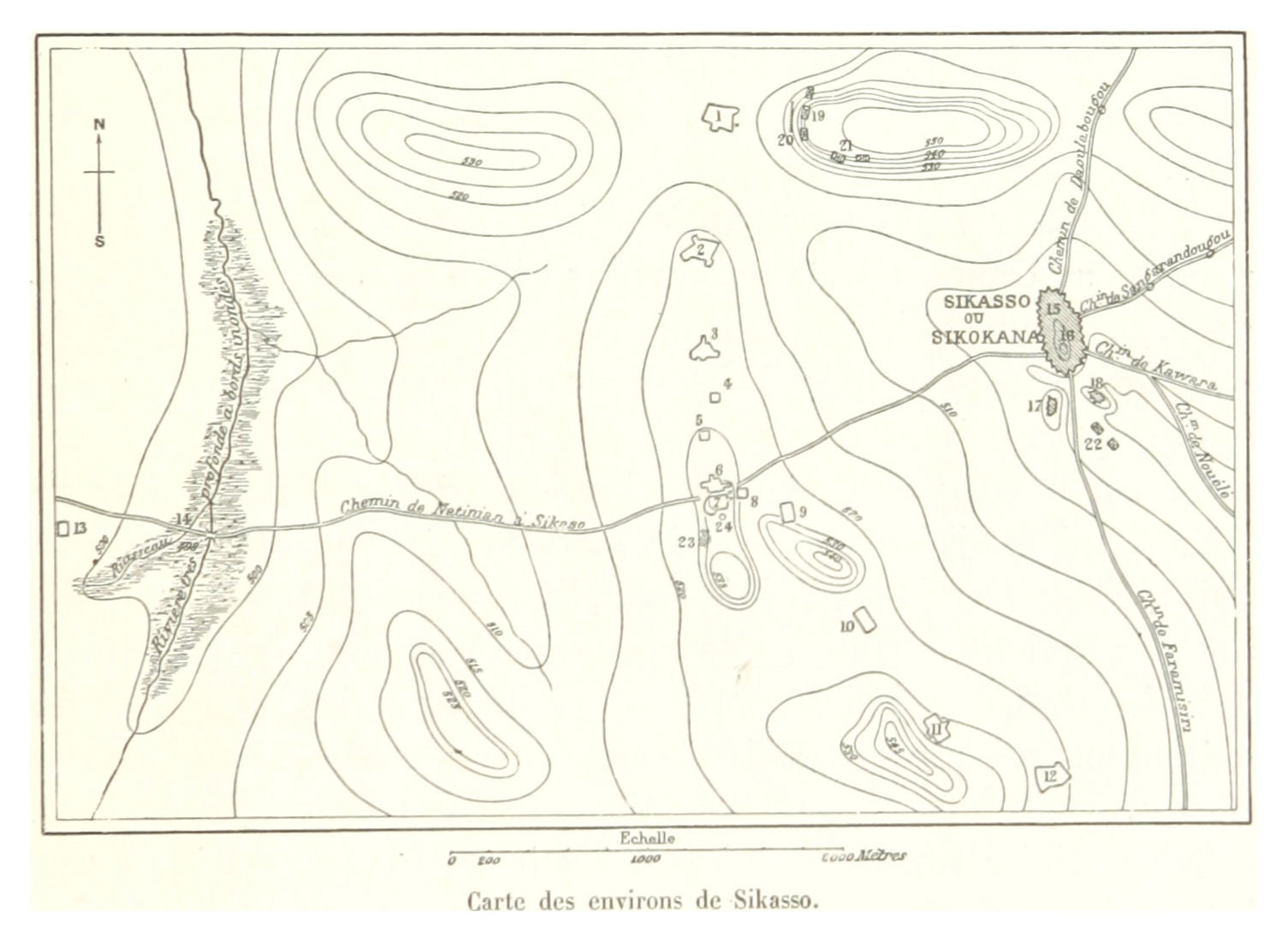
Map of Sikasso and surroundings, 1892

== Geography ==
Located 375 kilometres (233 mi) southeast of Bamako, 100 kilometres (62 mi) north of Côte d'Ivoire, and 45 kilometres (28 mi) west of Burkina Faso, Sikasso acts as a crossroads between the coastal countries (Togo, Bénin, Ghana, Côte d'Ivoire) and the landlocked Mali and Burkina Faso. Sikasso's ethnic groups include the Senufo Bamana,(mainly the Supyire), the Bobo (or Bobo Fing, lit. 'black Bobo'), and the Minianka (Mamara Senufo).

Sikasso has abundant agriculture. Sikasso's fruit and vegetable production guarantees the city's self-sufficiency, sparing it from reliance on international food aid.

== Climate ==
Sikasso features a tropical wet and dry climate under the Köppen climate classification. The city receives just under 1,200 millimetres (47 in) of rain each year, most of which falls between May and October. August is the wettest month, with an average rainfall of 308.8 millimetres (12.16 in). The highest temperatures are reached at the end of the dry season in March and April when the average daily maximum temperatures are just above 37 °C (98.6 °F).

Climate data for Sikasso (1991-2020, extremes 1940-present)
| Month | Jan | Feb | Mar | Apr | May | Jun | Jul | Aug | Sep | Oct | Nov | Dec | Year |
|---|---|---|---|---|---|---|---|---|---|---|---|---|---|
| Record high °C (°F) | 40.5 (104.9) | 41.2 (106.2) | 42.2 (108.0) | 42.0 (107.6) | 44.0 (111.2) | 39.2 (102.6) | 42.2 (108.0) | 36.7 (98.1) | 38.9 (102.0) | 38.9 (102.0) | 40.0 (104.0) | 39.2 (102.6) | 44.0 (111.2) |
| Mean daily maximum °C (°F) | 32.8 (91.0) | 35.7 (96.3) | 37.6 (99.7) | 37.4 (99.3) | 35.6 (96.1) | 33.0 (91.4) | 30.6 (87.1) | 29.8 (85.6) | 31.0 (87.8) | 33.3 (91.9) | 34.6 (94.3) | 33.2 (91.8) | 33.7 (92.7) |
| Daily mean °C (°F) | 25.2 (77.4) | 28.2 (82.8) | 31.0 (87.8) | 31.6 (88.9) | 30.2 (86.4) | 28.1 (82.6) | 26.4 (79.5) | 25.9 (78.6) | 26.4 (79.5) | 27.8 (82.0) | 27.3 (81.1) | 25.3 (77.5) | 27.8 (82.0) |
| Mean daily minimum °C (°F) | 17.5 (63.5) | 20.8 (69.4) | 24.3 (75.7) | 25.7 (78.3) | 24.7 (76.5) | 23.1 (73.6) | 22.1 (71.8) | 21.8 (71.2) | 21.7 (71.1) | 22.3 (72.1) | 20.1 (68.2) | 17.4 (63.3) | 21.8 (71.2) |
| Record low °C (°F) | 8.2 (46.8) | 10.0 (50.0) | 13.0 (55.4) | 16.8 (62.2) | 17.1 (62.8) | 17.7 (63.9) | 17.2 (63.0) | 17.0 (62.6) | 18.0 (64.4) | 14.0 (57.2) | 10.0 (50.0) | 8.0 (46.4) | 8.0 (46.4) |
| Average precipitation mm (inches) | 3.2 (0.13) | 3.8 (0.15) | 10.5 (0.41) | 49.7 (1.96) | 98.8 (3.89) | 158.5 (6.24) | 237.8 (9.36) | 313.9 (12.36) | 231.2 (9.10) | 91.3 (3.59) | 8.5 (0.33) | 0.0 (0.0) | 1,207.2 (47.52) |
| Average precipitation days (≥ 1.0 mm) | 0.4 | 0.5 | 1.8 | 6.3 | 10.2 | 13.5 | 17.7 | 20.2 | 18.7 | 10.2 | 1.1 | 0.0 | 100.6 |
| Average relative humidity (%) | 31 | 27 | 33 | 48 | 61 | 72 | 79 | 82 | 80 | 71 | 52 | 38 | 56 |
| Mean monthly sunshine hours | 263.1 | 242.3 | 237.6 | 217.5 | 242.0 | 220.8 | 203.2 | 176.6 | 190.7 | 243.0 | 257.6 | 261.6 | 2,756 |
Source 1: World Meteorological Organization
Source 2: NOAA (sun 1961–1990), Deutscher Wetterdienst (extremes and humidity)

== Places of worship ==
Among the places of worship, they are predominantly Muslim mosques. There are also Christian churches and temples : Roman Catholic Diocese of Sikasso (Catholic Church), Église Chrétienne Évangélique du Mali (Alliance World Fellowship), Assemblies of God.

== Sister Cities ==
Sikasso's sister city is Brive-la-Gaillarde, in France.

== See also ==
- List of cities in Mali
