= Sikasso Region =

Region of Mali

- Region
- Location within Mali
- Coordinates: 11°11′59″N 7°5′49″W
- Country: Mali
- Capital: Sikasso

Government
  - Governor: Kanté Marie Claire Dembélé

Area
  - Total: 20,800 km^{2} (8,000 sq mi)

Population (2023)
  - Total: 1,512,247
  - Density: 72.7/km^{2} (188/sq mi)
- Time zone: UTC±0 (UTC)
- HDI (2017): 0.410 low · 3rd

Sikasso Region (Bambara: ߛߌߞߊߛߏ ߘߌߣߋߖߊ tr. Sikaso Dineja; Supyire: Sukwoo Síŋi) is the southernmost region of Mali. The region's capital city, Sikasso, is the country's second-largest city. Major ethnic groups include the Senoufo, known for masks and reverence for animals, the Samogo, known for being Mali's best farmers, and the main ethnic group in Mali, the Bambara people.

== Administrative divisions ==
Sikasso Region is divided into seven cercles:

Cercle name	Area (km^{2})	Population Census 1998	Population Census 2009
Bougouni	20,028	307,633	459,509
Kadiolo	5,375	130,730	239,713
Kolondiéba	9,200	141,861	202,618
Koutiala	8,740	382,350	575,253
Sikasso	15,375	514,764	725,494
Yanfolila	9,240	163,798	211,824
Yorosso	5,500	141,021	211,508

The city of Sikasso has an outdoor market which features fabrics, numerous vegetables and fruits such as mangoes. Sikasso is an ethnic and linguistic melting pot consisting of people from outlying villages, immigrants from Côte d'Ivoire and Burkina Faso and refugees.

The southwest corner of the Sikasso region is traditionally known as Wassoulou. This area is known for its unique music and strong tradition of hunting. The main city of Wassoulou is Yanfolila.

Besides the regional capital, the other urban communes and major cities in Sikasso Region where Bougouni, a junction town en route to Bamako and Koutiala in the northern part of Sikasso Region, which is a hub of Mali's cotton industry, one of the country's few exports. In 2023 Bougouni and Koutiala became independent regions of Mali.

=== Communities ===
- Mandela

== Demographics ==
Ethnicity in Sikasso (2022)
1. Senufo (45.7%)
2. Bambara (27.5%)
3. Fula (11.2%)
4. Samogo (6.65%)
5. Dogon (1.89%)
6. Malinké (1.77%)
7. Soninke (1.10%)
8. Bobo / Bwa (0.99%)
9. Other (3.27%)

In 2023, the Sikasso Region had a population of 1,512,247. It is the third most populated region in Mali, with around 1,533,123 inhabitants as of 2022. The settlement pattern is predominantly rural, with 28.8% of the population urbanized.

Mother tongues in Sikasso region (2022 census)
1. Bambara (46.85%)
2. Senufo (33.58%)
3. Fula (5.94%)
4. Samogo (5.73%)
5. Minianka (1.95%)
6. Dogon (1.60%)
7. Malinke (1.26%)
8. Other Malian (2.87%)
9. Other African (0.05%)
10. Other foreign (0.17%)

With a total fertility rate of 6.3 births per woman, Sikasso has a slightly higher TFR than the Malian national average TFR of 6.1 births per woman.

Year	Population
1998	645,494
2009	978,395
2023	1,512,247

=== Ethnicity ===
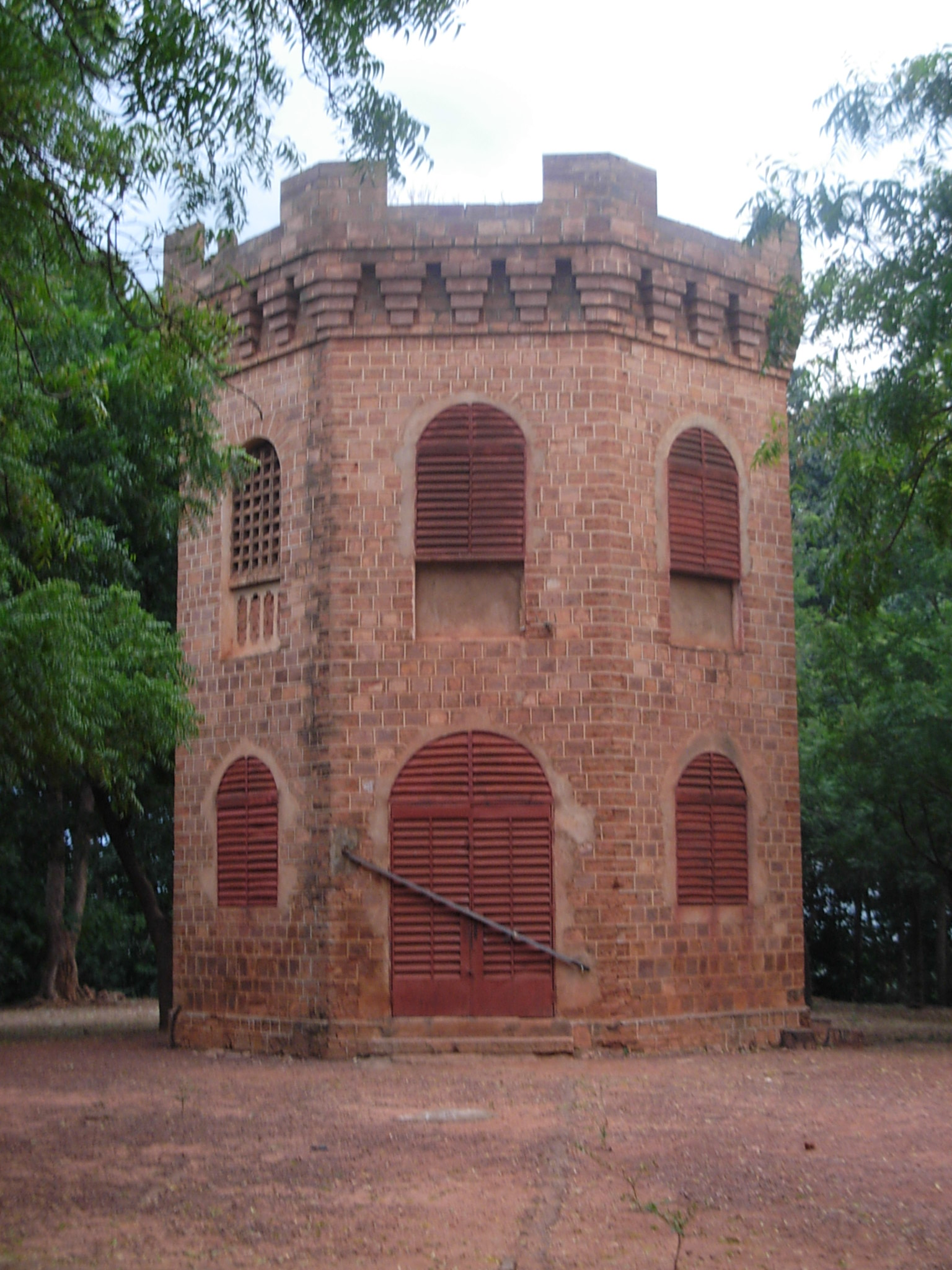
Mamelon of Sikasso constructed by the king of Kénédougou

Sikasso is ethnically and linguistically diverse. The Senufo–primarily belonging to the Supyire subgroup–accounted for 45.71% of the regional population in 2022. Sikasso is one of only two Malian regions, the other being Koutiala, where the Senufo constitute the largest ethnic group. Other significant ethnic groups in the region include the Bambara, Fula, Samogo, Dogon, Malinké, Soninke, and Bobo/Bwa. Sikasso also has the highest concentration of Samogo people in the entirety of Mali.

=== Religion ===
The 2022 census found that 96.30% of the population in Sikasso was Muslim, 1.50% was Christian, 0.93% identified with traditional faiths, 1.04% had no religion, and 0.23% practiced other religions. Although Islam is the dominant religion among all the ethnic groups in the region (except the Bobo/Bwa), a significant minority of Senufo identify with traditional faiths.

== See also ==
- Regions of Mali
- Cercles of Mali
