= Boundiali =

- Town, sub-prefecture, and commune
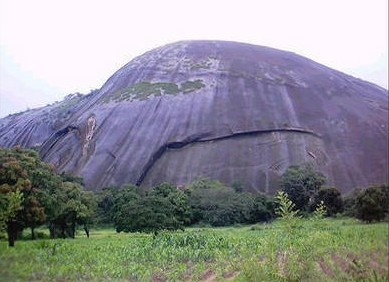
- A mountain near Boundiali

- Location in Ivory Coast
- Coordinates: 9°31′N 6°29′W
- Country: Ivory Coast
- District: Savanes
- Region: Bagoué
- Department: Boundiali

Area
  - Total: 1,480 km^{2} (570 sq mi)

Population (2021 census)
  - Total: 92,792
  - Density: 62.7/km^{2} (162/sq mi)
  - Town: 39,962
- (2014 census)
- Time zone: UTC+0 (GMT)

Boundiali is a town in northern Ivory Coast. It is a sub-prefecture of and the seat of Boundiali Department. It is also the seat of Bagoué Region in Savanes District and a commune.

Its population, the Boundialikas, is composed mainly of ethnic groups shared across the borders of Mali, Guinea, and Burkina Faso, as well as some Fulas. Boundiali is a centre for Senoufo people and is known for crafts. The inhabitants are chiefly farmers and stockbreeders as well as tradesmen or civil servants.

== Economy ==
The economy of the town of Boundiali is largely based on the cotton industry, introduced by the French during the colonial period, and primarily intended for export. Corn, groundnut, millet, manioc, banana, mangoes, yam, and rice are also cultivated, mainly for local consumption.

The town has a hospital, a modern college and two factories for cotton processing, its principal industry, to the point of being called "white gold".

== Politics ==
Boundiali's mayor is Mariatou Koné who succeeded Zémogo Fofana, former member of the RDR, and a former government minister. He has created his own party with Jean-Jacques Bechio, another former minister and Director of the RDR.

== Geography ==
The town is surrounded by two "mountains" that are part of the Guinean mountain range that culminates at Mount Nimba.

The area is savanna region, with tropical to subtropical vegetation. The climate is very hot and dry (Sudanese climate). In December and January, Harmattan, a powerful wind, blows in from the Sahara, lowering the temperature considerably.

== Culture ==
The neighbouring villages, are home to artisans who manufacture statues of human or animal figures as well as wood-carved doors and sénoufo chairs.

The ceremonies of the area are celebrated with the popular use of Djembe, Kora and Balaphon.

Onchocerciasis devastated the riverside villages of the area, but was effectively eradicated in 1980, thanks chiefly to Canadian co-operation.

== Places of interest ==
- Hippopotamuses in the River Bagoué.
- The neighbouring forests are home to panthers which are sometimes killed by villagers, although hunting is prohibited in the territory.
- Niofoin, the typical Sénoufo village, is located towards Korhogo. It is here that Jean-Jacques Annaud made his first film, La Victoire, 1975 (with Jean Carmet).
- North of the city, towards Tingréla, the villages of Kouto, Gbon and Kolia are located, which are populated by weavers and blacksmiths.
- The village of Tiémé, in direction of Odienné, sheltered René Caillié at the time of his voyage from Conakry to Timbuktoo, where he was cured of scurvy by the attentive care of the villagers.
- Fula camps in the savanna outside the city.

== People linked to the town ==
- Muriel Diallo, author of children's stories was born here in 1967.
- Writer Ahmadou Kourouma was born in Boundiali.

== Neighbouring cities ==
- Korhogo to the east.
- Odienné to the west.
- Tingréla to the north.
- Séguéla to the south.

In 2021, the population of the sub-prefecture of Boundiali was 92,792.

== Villages ==
The 18 villages of the sub-prefecture of Boundiali and their population in 2014 are:

1. Boundiali (39 962)
2. Gnagnon (356)
3. Nondara (1 850)
4. Samorosso (281)
5. Tombougou (652)
6. Diogo (2 089)
7. Farandougou (963)
8. Gbando (323)
9. Gbemou (1 190)
10. Guinguereni (1 349)
11. Kaniene (958)
12. Kebi (2 787)
13. M'bia (462)
14. N'dara (951)
15. Niguedougou (503)
16. Ouazomon (1 956)
17. Seleho (973)
18. Sokourani (1 981)
