= Mali fuel blockade =

2025 Jihadist fuel blockade

- Part of Mali War of the Sahel War
| Date | September 3, 2025 – present |
| Location | Kayes Region, Koulikoro Region, Segou Region, Mopti Region, Sikasso Region, and elsewhere in Mali |
| Status | At least 300 tankers destroyed |

Belligerents
| Mali; Russia | Jama'at Nusrat al-Islam wal Muslimin |

Commanders and leaders
| Assimi Goïta; Famouké Camara | Unknown |

Casualties and losses
| Unknown | 2+ soldiers killed |
- Unknown

An ongoing fuel blockade is being administered by Jama'at Nusrat al-Islam wal-Muslimin (JNIM) against cities in southern Mali. The blockade began on September 3, 2025, when JNIM spokesman Abou Houzeifa al-Bambari announced it in a video. Since the start of the blockade, over 300 fuel tankers have been destroyed en route from Senegal, Ivory Coast, and Guinea. Some fuel was able to enter the towns of Bamako, Ségou, Kayes, San, and Mopti in November and December 2025.

Analysts have referred to the blockade as a siege on Mali, and purported that the blockade was an attempt to put pressure on the Malian junta and eventually take over Bamako and other cities. The blockade eased in early 2026, due to negotiations with the government and increased military activity, though JNIM's preparations for the 25 April offensive also may have been a reason. JNIM announced a full blockade on Bamako on 28 April.

== Background ==
Jama'at Nusrat al-Islam wal-Muslimin is an al-Qaeda-affiliated coalition of jihadist groups formed in 2017 that is currently waging an insurgency against the governments of Mali, Burkina Faso, and Niger, with a presence in Benin and Togo. In areas under its influence, the group has taxed vehicles transporting people or commodities across Mali and between Mali, Burkia Faso, and Niger. These activities have largely occurred in and around Mopti Region, Tombouctou Region, and Gao Region, where the group holds the most influence. Despite Malian government efforts through the deployment of the Russian Wagner Group and Turkish drones, JNIM has expanded further south into Koulikoro Region and Sikasso Region in 2024 and 2025. In July 2025, JNIM launched a failed simultaneous attack on Malian military outposts in Kayes, Ségou, Bamako, and other sites in western and southern Mali.

Mali, being a landlocked country, is entirely dependent on its coastal West African neighbors for imports like fuel. These fuel tankers are transported on roads coming from Senegal, Guinea, Ivory Coast, and sometimes Mauritania. 95% of Malian fuel imports come from Senegalese and Ivorian trading routes. The main road between Senegal and Mali, National Road 1 (NR1), goes through the city of Kayes. JNIM militants, preachers, and sympathizers had been spotted by locals in western Mali prior to the blockade. Their strategy was to play on tensions between village chiefs and residents, preach that Shari'a law was less corrupt and more fair than Malian government law, and gain a following large enough to become a JNIM cell.

== Blockade ==
=== 2025 ===
==== September attacks ====
The blockade was announced on September 3, 2025, by JNIM spokesman Abou Houzeifa al-Bambari in a video released by JNIM's Az-Zallaqa Foundation. The blockade was initially announced to pressue the Malian government to lift taxes on fuel imports in rural areas of the country, but later expanded to a method of pressuring the Malian government to acquiesce to the group's demands of imposing Sharia law in Mali. Residents of western Mali had said that since the announcement of the blockade, road traffic from Senegal had decreased. JNIM had also installed checkpoints demanding "taxes" from drivers. The blockade has brought entire villages to an economic standstill. Malian army spokesman Souleymane Dembele said that the blockade was fictitious and "information warfare orchestrated by foreign media", with "no systematic interruption of transport [has been] observed."

On September 4, the group kidnapped two Senegalese truck drivers and four apprentices in Mali. This was confirmed by the Union of Road Haulage Operators of Senegal. The six drivers were freed and returned safely to Senegal on September 8.

The first attack on fuel tankers occurred between the towns of Kaniara and Lakamane in Kayes region. Videos recorded by JNIM fighters and onlookers showed a fuel tanker exploding, and other fuel tankers shot up on the road. One Malian military vehicle was also shown, with one visible death. The initial convoy consisted of 80 tankers, with Malian and Russian military escort. That same day, al-Bambari congratulated the fighters who carried out the attack in a video statement. The Malian Armed Forces confirmed the attack, and said that they "responded vigorously". Satellite imagery showed over 50 tankers at the site, 30 of which were blackened from burns.

The second videographed attack was on September 19, between the villages of Neguela and Soribougou in Koulikoro Region. Nine burnt-out tankers can be seen on the road in satellite imagery from November.

Other attacks on fuel tankers were reported between September 3 and September 16 between Sikasso and Zégoua and Niono and Ségou.

==== October attacks ====
JNIM reported another ambush on fuel tankers between the towns of Kolondieba and Kadiana on October 17. Fighters on October 21 recorded the aftermath of this attack, with over 50 tankers being burnt. Another attack occurred near Sikasso on October 21, with over 40 tankers destroyed and one body holding a weapon visible at the scene. A third attack was claimed by JNIM on October 28 between Neguela and Soribougou, just north of the site of the September attack.

Bamako received fuel on October 30, after nearly two months of the blockade. Imagery of fuel tankers entering the city was disseminated by Malian and Russian media, and showed large convoys of fuel tankers protected by military and mercenary vehicles. This footage was recorded just outside Bougouni, an area where Malian forces deployed more forces to combat the blockade.

==== November attacks ====
On November 1, JNIM released a statement saying that the blockade would be expanded to include fuel trucks entering Mali from Niger. JNIM claimed an attack on fuel tankers between Zegoua and Sikasso on November 6, with the attack being geolocated to the town of Fachoribougou. Since October 27, at least 1,200 tankers have been able to make it to Bamako under Malian military protection from Côte d'Ivoire and Bougouni.

=== 2026 ===
==== January ====
JNIM insurgents ambush a fuel tanker convoy in western Mali near the Senegalese border, killing at least 15 people, and destroying the tankers.

==== April–May ====
JNIM imposed a blockade again on 28 April, framing it as retaliation for Bamako residents helping the Malian army kill or capture JNIM militants during the 25 April offensive. Radio France Internationale reported roadblocks to the west of Bamako in Soribougou, to the southwest in Naréna, and to the south in Ouélessébougou.

== Effects ==
The fuel blockade has paralyzed Malian civil services. After the start of the blockade, citizens have been forced to wait in hours-long lines for fuel, and the little fuel that is able to make it into large cities is directed to Malian military and government facilities. Satellite imagery from May and October shows Bamako with less lighting as a result of the fuel blockade. The town of Mopti, among others, has been without fuel for over a month. Russia also announced that they planned on transporting 200,000 tons of petroleum to alleviate the crisis. The United Nations was also forced to withdraw from its emergency fuel stockpile in the country.

Foreign embassies urged their citizens to flee the country in November 2025, partially due to the blockade but also due to a rise in kidnappings by JNIM in cities with a large military presence like Bamako. The United States embassy urged Americans to "depart immediately using commercial aviation" from Mali on October 28, followed by similar warnings by the United Kingdom. The US and UK both pulled diplomatic embassy staff as well.

Malian schools shut down between October 26 and November 9 due to the blockade, according to a statement from Education Minister Amadou Sy Savane. Many businesses remained closed from late October to mid November, and the government prioritized available fuel for Energie du Mali, the state-owned electricity provider. Many major towns experienced rolling blackouts or were left without power for weeks.

=== Transportation ===
In the JNIM's initial statement on September 2, al-Bambari said that fuel tankers part of the Diarra Transport Company would be targeted by the group. al-Bambari accused the company of transporting Malian soldiers and military equipment. The ban was lifted on October 17, after the CEO of the company agreed to JNIM's terms of segregating men and women, mandating women wear burqas, and compensation in case of an accident. In response to this, the Malian government suspended activities of Diarra Transport Company on October 23.

JNIM fighters have been reported checking if buses adhered to these new stipulations in at least six instances.

=== Offensive ===
The blockade also facilitated a JNIM offensive into southern Mali since September, where they took control of the town of Loulouni in Sikasso region.
