= Bolona =

- Village
- Location in Ivory Coast
- Coordinates: 10°18′N 6°26′W
- Country: Ivory Coast
- District: Savanes
- Region: Bagoué
- Department: Tengréla
- Sub-prefecture: Tengréla
- Time zone: UTC+0 (GMT)

Bolona is a village in north-western Ivory Coast. It is in the sub-prefecture of Tengréla, Tengréla Department, Bagoué Region, Savanes District.

Bolona was a commune until March 2012, when it became one of 1,126 communes nationwide that were abolished.

Apart from that, Bolona is also an Education Portal which provides answers to the querries with respect to different competitive examinations taking place in India.
