= Landiougou =

- Village
- Location in Ivory Coast
- Coordinates: 9°47′N 6°18′W
- Country: Ivory Coast
- District: Savanes
- Region: Bagoué
- Department: Boundiali
- Sub-prefecture: Kasséré
- Time zone: UTC+0 (GMT)

Landiougou is a village in northern Ivory Coast. It is in the sub-prefecture of Kasséré, Boundiali Department, Bagoué Region, Savanes District.

Landiougou was a commune until March 2012, when it became one of 1,126 communes nationwide that were abolished.
