= Ponondougou =

- Village
- Location in Ivory Coast
- Coordinates: 9°31′N 6°19′W
- Country: Ivory Coast
- District: Savanes
- Region: Bagoué
- Department: Boundiali
- Sub-prefecture: Siempurgo
- Time zone: UTC+0 (GMT)

Ponondougou is a village in northern Ivory Coast. It is in the sub-prefecture of Siempurgo, Boundiali Department, Bagoué Region, Savanes District. The population is mainly Senufos.

Ponondougou was a commune until March 2012, when it became one of 1,126 communes nationwide that were abolished.

The parents of singer Ismaël Isaac are from Ponondougou.
