= Zaguinasso =

- Village
- Location in Ivory Coast
- Coordinates: 10°3′N 6°22′W
- Country: Ivory Coast
- District: Savanes
- Region: Bagoué
- Department: Kouto
- Sub-prefecture: Kouto
- Time zone: UTC+0 (GMT)

Zaguinasso is a village in northern Ivory Coast. It is in the sub-prefecture of Kouto, Kouto Department, Bagoué Region, Savanes District.

Zaguinasso was a commune until March 2012, when it became one of 1,126 communes nationwide that were abolished.
