= N'Déou =

- Village
- Location in Ivory Coast
- Coordinates: 9°58′N 6°37′W
- Country: Ivory Coast
- District: Savanes
- Region: Bagoué
- Department: Kouto
- Sub-prefecture: Sianhala
- Time zone: UTC+0 (GMT)

N'Déou is a village in northern Ivory Coast. It is in the sub-prefecture of Sianhala, Kouto Department, Bagoué Region, Savanes District.

N'Déou was a commune until March 2012, when it became one of 1,126 communes nationwide that were abolished.
