= Battle of the Sama Forest =

- Part of Mali War
Date	July 16, 2015
Location	Sama Forest, Sikasso Region, Mali
Result	Malian victory

Belligerents
Mali; Mali Armed Forces	Khalid ibn Walid katiba

Units involved
Malian Army; 33rd Parachute Commando Regiment	Unknown

Casualties and losses
2 injured	5 killed 21 arrested

On July 16, 2015, the Malian army raided a jihadist base in the Sama Forest, in southern Mali's Sikasso Region. The raid is one of the few confrontations between jihadists and the Malian army in southern Mali, and marked the end of the Khalid ibn Walid katiba and jihadist expansion in southern Mali.

== Background ==
In 2015, Ansar Dine, a Malian jihadist group usually based in the north of the country, attempted to expand southwards and create a new front in southern Mali's Sikasso Region. On June 10, 2015, the Ansar Dine-affiliated katiba Khalid ibn Walid katiba attacked a Malian gendarmerie post in Misséni on the Ivorian border, killing one gendarme, torching vehicles, and raising their black flag over the camp. The second ever attack in Sikasso region occurred on June 28, when Ansar Dine-affiliated men captured the town of Fakola with no resistance, and retreated after a few hours.

In July, more jihadists were captured headed southwards. An emissary of Ansar Dine commander Iyad Ag Ghaly was captured on July 9 near Bamako, and on July 13, twenty suspected jihadist recruits were arrested on a bus headed from Côte d'Ivoire into Mali. The suspects included thirteen Mauritanians, two Malians, two French, and two Franco-Malian dual nationals. Most were members of the Dawa sect of Islam.

== Battle ==
After the attacks in June, the Malian Army began combing operations in Sikasso, especially in the Sama Forest close to the Ivorian border. On July 16, intelligence from locals led Malian forces to a jihadist base in the forest. Two offensives were carried out by the 33rd Parachute Commando Regiment, considered an elite unit of the Malian army, and they captured weapons and equipment from the camp. Many of the jihadists ere killed or fled.

The jihadists reportedly were from Ansar Dine and Katiba Macina and the "barefoot" sect. Souleymane Keita, the founder of the Khalid ibn Walid katiba, fled to Guinea.

== Aftermath ==
While the Malian government did not release a statement about the battle, French news agencies reported the injuries of two Malian soldiers. Ten jihadists were killed and ten were captured, according to the BBC, and Studio Tamani claimed the deaths of thirty fighters and fifteen taken prisoner. Jeune Afrique later reported that the katiba had thirty fighters, according to a Malian military official. Five of those were killed, fourteen were captured by Malian forces, and seven were arrested by Ivorian forces.
