= Wora, Ivory Coast =

Wora
- Village
- Location in Ivory Coast
- Coordinates: 10°4′N 6°19′W
- Country: Ivory Coast
- District: Savanes
- Region: Bagoué
- Department: Kouto
- Sub-prefecture: Kouto
- Time zone: UTC+0 (GMT)

Wora is a village in northern Ivory Coast. It is in the sub-prefecture of Kouto, Kouto Department, Bagoué Region, Savanes District. Wora is located 26 kilometres northeast of Kouto.
