= Diamankani =

- Village
- Location in Ivory Coast
- Coordinates: 10°34′N 6°32′W
- Country: Ivory Coast
- District: Savanes
- Region: Bagoué
- Department: Tengréla
- Sub-prefecture: Tengréla
- Time zone: UTC+0 (GMT)

Diamankani is a village in the far north of Ivory Coast. It is in the sub-prefecture of Tengréla, Tengréla Department, Bagoué Region, Savanes District. Three kilometres northeast of the village is a border crossing with Mali.

Diamankani was a commune until March 2012, when it became one of 1,126 communes nationwide that were abolished.
