= Souleymane Keïta (jihadist) =

Senegalese militant (died 2020)

Personal details
- Born: 1959 or 1968 Kaolack, Senegal or Kangaba, Mali
- Died: 2020

Military service
- Allegiance: Ansar Dine (2012–2020); Khalid ibn al-Walid Battalion (2015–2020)
- Rank: Emir
- Commands: Khalid ibn al-Walid Battalion
- Battles/wars: Mali War: Battle of Konna; Battle of the Sama Forest

Souleymane Keïta was a Senegalese jihadist and the founder of the short-lived Khalid ibn al-Walid Battalion of Katiba Macina.

== Biography ==
Keïta was born in 1959 or 1968 near Kaolack, Senegal, although other sources state he was born in Kangaba, Mali, near the Guinean border. He was born to a large Malinke family from Guinea. Keïta attended a madrasa during his childhood and traveled to Egypt for religious studies, along with receiving military training there. During his time in Egypt, he also made several trips to Saudi Arabia. In the mid-2000's, Keïta met Iyad Ag Ghaly at the Markaze mosque in Bamako, run by the Tablighi Jamaat.

Keïta joined Ghaly's Ansar Dine in 2012, fighting in the early stages of the Mali War. Malian security sources stated that Keïta would have served as a "recruiting sergeant" during this time. Keïta also fought against French and Malian forces at the Battle of Konna. After Operation Serval, Keïta returned to southern Mali and founded the Khalid ibn al-Walid Battalion, also known as Ansar Dine Sud. His battalion had fighters from southern Mali, along with jihadists from Ivory Coast and Burkina Faso. Keïta commanded around 200 fighters, and was heavily involved with Amadou Koufa's Katiba Macina.

At the start of 2015, Keïta established a base in Samarco, on the Malian-Ivorian border. This base was ultimately destroyed by the Malian army, and the battalion's weapons were seized. He then established another base in the Sama Forest of Sikasso Region, on the Malian-Ivorian border. On June 10, 2016, the Khalid ibn al-Walid battalion briefly occupied the town of Misséni and then the town of Fakola on June 28. The Malian army attacked the battalion's base in the Sama Forest on July 16, destroying it.

Following the battle of the Sama Forest, Keïta fled to Guinea, and then moved between Guinea, Sierra Leone, and The Gambia. Keïta's son-in-law and the second-in-command of the battalion, Amadou Niangadou or Djogormé, was arrested in Ivory Coast and transferred to Mali on August 19 along with six of his men. At the start of 2016, Keïta returned to Mali and hid in the Wagadou Forest along the Mauritanian border with the help of Katiba Macina. On March 29, 2016, while attempting to flee to Adrar des Ifoghas to meet up with Ghaly, Keïta was apprehended by the Malian army near Sokolo and transferred to Bamako.

After a four-hour trial, Keïta was sentenced to death by a Malian court on November 13, 2020. He stated that "I regret nothing because our fight is against the secularism of the Malian state. If I had the chance, I would do it again."
