= Mahalé =

- Village
- Location in Ivory Coast
- Coordinates: 10°8′N 6°35′W
- Country: Ivory Coast
- District: Savanes
- Region: Bagoué
- Department: Kouto
- Sub-prefecture: Gbon
- Time zone: UTC+0 (GMT)

Mahalé is a village in north-western Ivory Coast. It is in the sub-prefecture of Gbon, Kouto Department, Bagoué Region, Savanes District.

Mahalé was a commune until March 2012, when it became one of 1,126 communes nationwide that were abolished.
