= Dioumaténé =

- Commune and village
- Location in Mali
- Coordinates: 10°31′54″N 5°54′20″W
- Country: Mali
- Region: Sikasso Region
- Cercle: Kadiolo Cercle

Area
  - Total: 225 km^{2} (87 sq mi)

Population (2009 census)
  - Total: 4,274
  - Density: 19.0/km^{2} (49.2/sq mi)
- Time zone: UTC+0 (GMT)

Dioumaténé is a village and rural commune in the Cercle of Kadiolo in the Sikasso Region of southern Mali. The commune covers an area of 225 square kilometers and includes 5 villages. In the 2009 census it had a population of 4,274. The village of Dioumaténé, the administrative center (chef-lieu) of the commune, is 16 km west of Kadiolo.
