= Papara (disambiguation) =

Papara is a commune on the island of Tahiti, French Polynesia. Papara may also refer to:

- Papara, Ivory Coast
- Papara, a dish also known as popara
