= Baya, Ivory Coast =

Baya
- Town and sub-prefecture
- Location in Ivory Coast
- Coordinates: 9°55′N 6°15′W
- Country: Ivory Coast
- District: Savanes
- Region: Bagoué
- Department: Boundiali

Population (2014)
  - Total: 8,591
- Time zone: UTC+0 (GMT)

Baya is a town in northern Ivory Coast. It is a sub-prefecture of Boundiali Department in Bagoué Region, Savanes District.

Baya was a commune until March 2012, when it became one of 1,126 communes nationwide that were abolished.

In 2014, the population of the sub-prefecture of Baya was 8,591.

== Villages ==
The 6 villages of the sub-prefecture of Baya and their population in 2014 are:

1. Baya (3,367)
2. Kofre (995)
3. Koundin ou Kounde (1,155)
4. Nongana (1,096)
5. Toungboli (240)
6. Yele (1,738)
