= Bakayoko =

Bakayoko is a surname of Ivorian origin, and may refer to:

- Amadou Bakayoko (born 1996), Sierra Leonean professional footballer
- Hamed Bakayoko (1965–2021), Ivorian politician
- Ibrahima Bakayoko (born 1976), Ivorian footballer
- Johan Bakayoko (born 2003), Belgian footballer
- Ramata Ly-Bakayoko (born 1955), Ivorian academic and government official
- Siaka Bakayoko (born 2005), French footballer
- Tiémoué Bakayoko (born 1994), French footballer
- Youssouf Bakayoko (born 1943), Minister for Foreign Affairs of Côte d'Ivoire
