= Mahale =

Mahale may refer to:

- Mahalé, an island in Ivory Coast
- Mahale Chiniha, Iran
- Mahale Mountains, Tanzania
- Mahale Mountains National Park, Tanzania
- Haribahu Shankar Mahale (1930–2005), Indian politician
- Shankar Mahale, Indian Revolutionary and Freedom fighter
- Shweta Mahale, Indian Politician
- Mahalle

== See also ==
- Bicyclus mahale, a butterfly in Tanzania
- Mahal (disambiguation)
