= Ivory Coast–Mali border =

International border

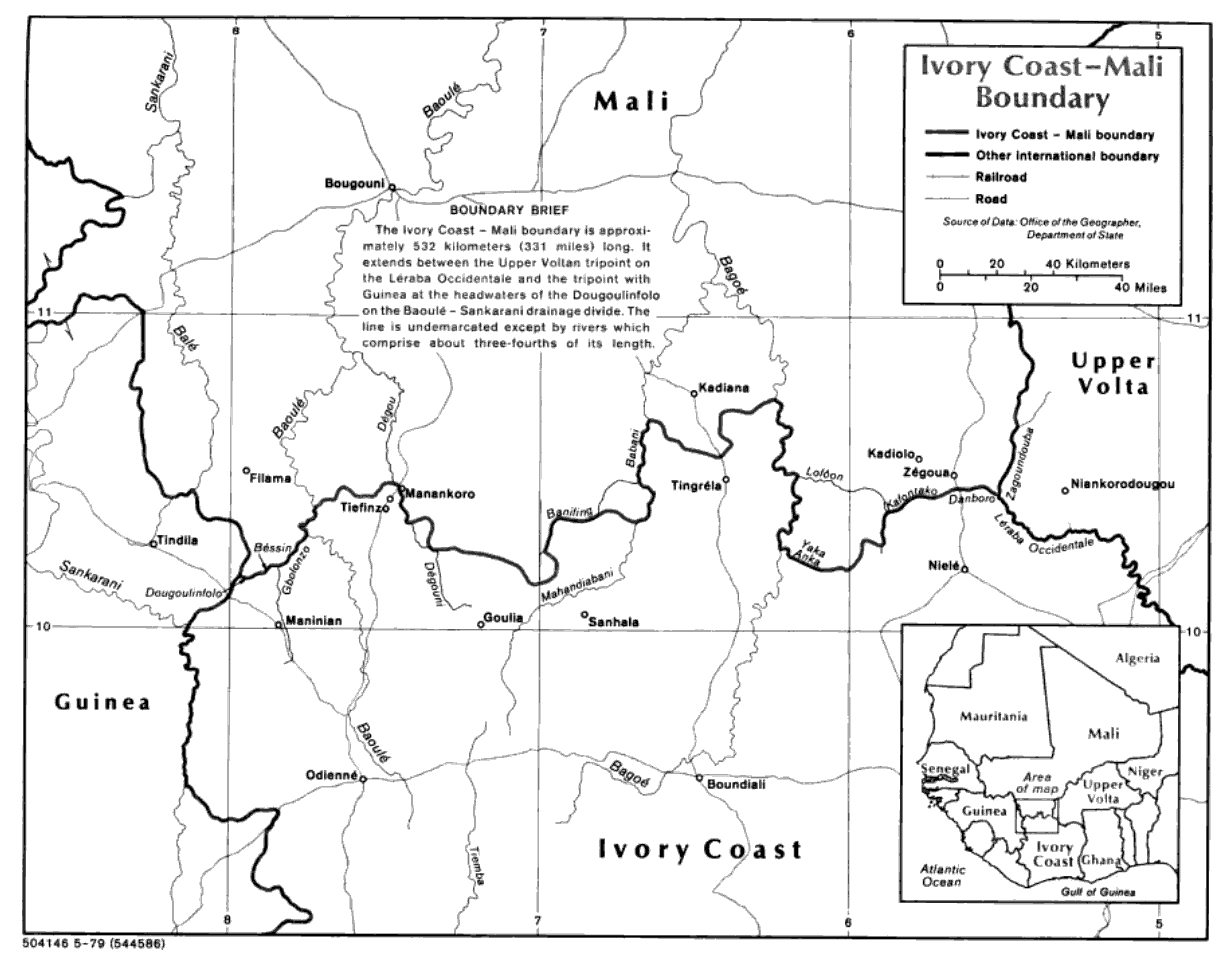
Ivory Coast-Mali border map

The Ivory Coast–Mali border is 599 km (372 mi) in length and runs from the tripoint with Guinea in the west to the tripoint with Burkina Faso in the east.

== Description ==
The border starts in the west at the tripoint with Guinea; it then proceeds, indirectly, eastwards via a series of overland and riverine sections (rivers utilised include the Baoule, Gbolonzon, Bessin, Dougoulinfolo, Degou, Banifing, Boronikono, Babani, Bagoé, Kobani, Yaka Anka, Lofoon, Kafonrako and Danboro), before reaching the tripoint with Burkina Faso on the Léraba River.

== History ==
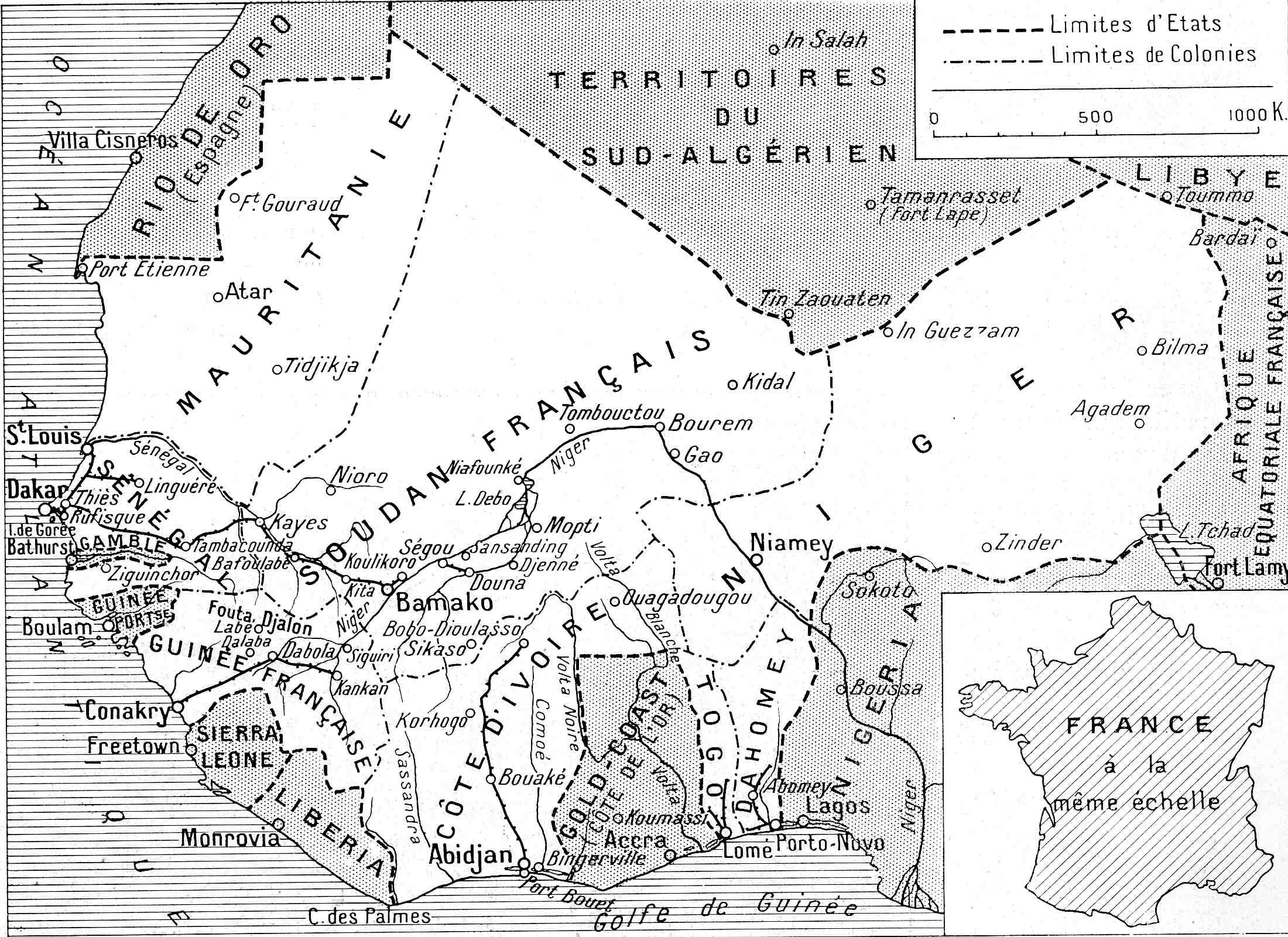
Map of French West Africa from 1936, showing the Ivory Coast-Mali border during the dissolution of Upper Volta

France had begun signing treaties with chiefs along the modern Ivorian coast in the 1840s, thereby establishing a protectorate which later became the colony of Ivory Coast in 1893. As a result of the Scramble for Africa in the 1880s France had gained control the upper valley of the Niger River (roughly equivalent to the areas of modern Mali and Niger). France occupied this area in 1900; Mali (then referred to as French Sudan) was originally included, along with modern Niger and Burkina Faso, within the Upper Senegal and Niger colony and (along with Ivory Coast) became a constituent of the federal colony of French West Africa (Afrique occidentale française, abbreviated AOF). A decree of 17 October 1899 transferred the towns of Odienné and Kong to Ivory Coast from French Sudan. The precise date the boundary was drawn appears to be uncertain - it is thought to have been drawn at the time of the formal institution of French West Africa and its constituent units in the 1890s.

The internal divisions of AOF underwent several changes during its existence; what are now Mali, Niger and Burkina Faso were initially united as Upper Senegal and Niger, with Niger constituting a military territory ruled from Zinder. The Niger military territory was split off in 1911, becoming a separate colony in 1922, and Mali and Upper Volta (Burkina Faso) were constituted as separate colonies in 1919. During the period 1932-47 Upper Volta was abolished and its territory split out between French Sudan, Niger and Ivory Coast.

As the movement for decolonisation grew in the post-Second World War era, France gradually granted more political rights and representation for their sub-Saharan African colonies, culminating in the granting of broad internal autonomy to French West Africa in 1958 within the framework of the French Community. Eventually, in 1960, both Mali and Ivory Coast gained independence, and their mutual frontier became an international one between two states.

Since the outbreak of conflict in northern Mali in 2012 Ivory Coast has begun strengthening security at the border in order to prevent any spill-over.

== Settlements near the border ==
=== Ivory Coast ===
- Sokourabo
- Tingrela
- Kanakoro

=== Mali ===
- Kadiana
- Tiongui
- Fourou
- Misséni
- Kadiolo
