= Farako =

Farako may refer to:

- Farako, Ségou
- Farako, Sikasso
