= Toutiala =

- Town
- Location in Mali
- Coordinates: 10°58′N 7°6′W
- Country: Mali
- Region: Sikasso Region
- Cercle: Kolondieba Cercle
- Commune: N'Golodiana
- Time zone: UTC+0 (GMT)

Toutiala is a town and seat of the commune of N'Golodiana in the Cercle of Kolondieba in the Sikasso Region of southern Mali.
