= Kolosso =

Kolosso may refer to:

- Kolosso (comics)
- Kolosso, Mali
