= Kaï, Mali =

Kaï
- Commune and village
- Location in Mali
- Coordinates: 10°58′10″N 5°41′40″W
- Country: Mali
- Region: Sikasso Region
- Cercle: Kadiolo Cercle

Area
  - Total: 183 km^{2} (71 sq mi)

Population (2009 census)
  - Total: 8,827
  - Density: 48.2/km^{2} (125/sq mi)
- Time zone: UTC+0 (GMT)

Kaï is a village and rural commune in the Cercle of Kadiolo in the Sikasso Region of southern Mali. The commune covers an area of 183 square kilometers and includes 8 villages. In the 2009 census it had a population of 8,827. The village of Kaï, the administrative center (chef-lieu) of the commune, is 47 km north of Kadiolo.
