= Diou, Mali =

Diou
- Commune and village
- Location in Mali
- Coordinates: 10°35′23″N 5°58′20″W
- Country: Mali
- Region: Sikasso Region
- Cercle: Kadiolo Cercle

Area
  - Total: 137 km^{2} (53 sq mi)

Population (2009 census)
  - Total: 6,003
  - Density: 43.8/km^{2} (113/sq mi)
- Time zone: UTC+0 (GMT)

Diou is a village and rural commune in the Cercle of Kadiolo in the Sikasso Region of southern Mali. The commune covers an area of 137 square kilometers and includes 3 villages. In the 2009 census it had a population of 6,003. The village of Diou, the administrative center (chef-lieu) of the commune, is 24 km west of Kadiolo.
