= Fourou =

- Commune and town
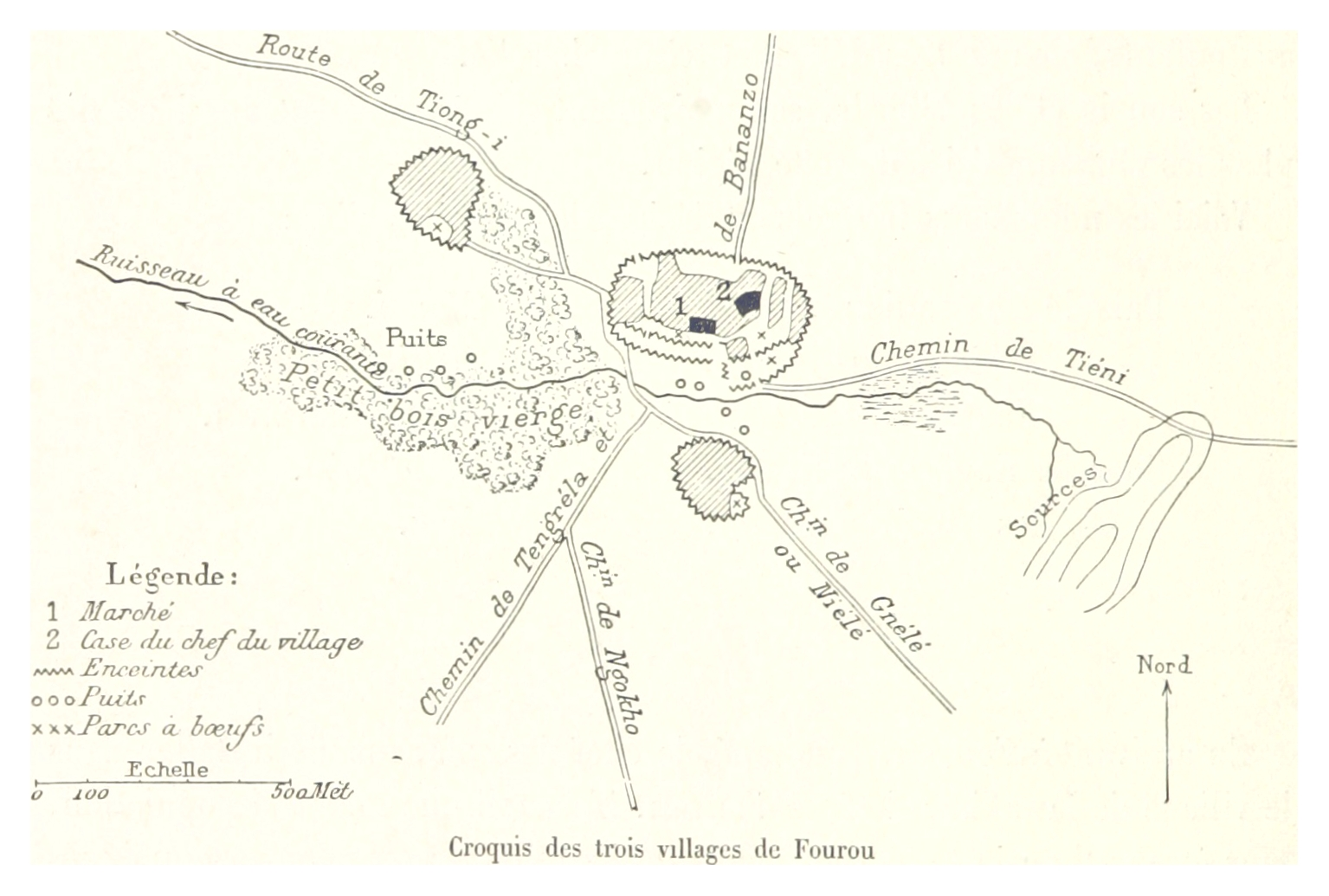
- Map of Fourou, 1892

- Location in Mali
- Coordinates: 10°44′50″N 6°8′25″W
- Country: Mali
- Region: Sikasso Region
- Cercle: Kadiolo Cercle

Area
  - Total: 1,334 km^{2} (515 sq mi)

Population (2009 census)
  - Total: 40,826
  - Density: 30.60/km^{2} (79.26/sq mi)
- Time zone: UTC+0 (GMT)

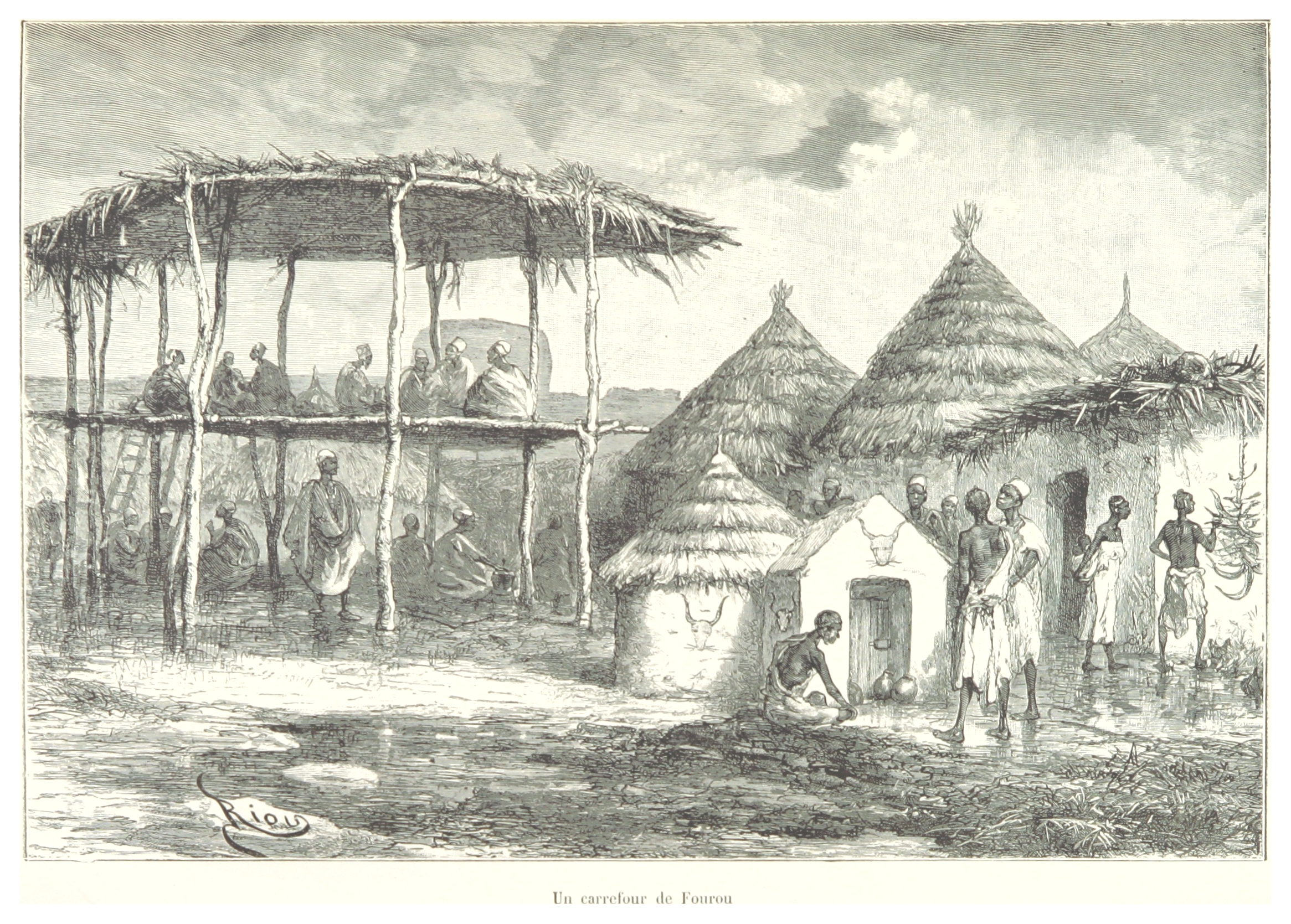
Fourou in 1892

Fourou is a town and rural commune in the Cercle of Kadiolo in the Sikasso Region of southern Mali near the border with Ivory Coast. The commune covers an area of 1,334 square kilometers and includes the town and 22 villages. In the 2009 census it had a population of 40,826. The town of Fourou, the administrative center (chef-lieu) of the commune, is 47 km northwest of Kadiolo.
