= Débété =

Débété Dabélé
- Town and sub-prefecture
- Location in Ivory Coast
- Coordinates: 10°37′N 6°39′W
- Country: Ivory Coast
- District: Savanes
- Region: Bagoué
- Department: Tengréla

Population (2014)
  - Total: 5,751
- Time zone: UTC+0 (GMT)

Débété (also spelled Dabélé) is a town in the far north of Ivory Coast. It is a sub-prefecture of Tengréla Department in Bagoué Region, Savanes District. Less than two kilometres northwest of town is a border crossing with Mali.

Débété was a commune until March 2012, when it became one of 1,126 communes nationwide that were abolished.

In 2014, the population of the sub-prefecture of Débété was 5,751.

== Villages ==
The five villages of the sub-prefecture of Débété and their population in 2014 are:

1. Beniasso (1,171)
2. Debete (3,211)
3. Kouroukoro (366)
4. Nianrangba (714)
5. Sirakoro (289)
