= Mahal =

Mahal may refer to:

== Places ==
- Mahal, India, a small town in Chittoor district of Andhra Pradesh, India
- Mahal, Punjab, a village in Jalandhar district of Punjab State, India
- Mahal, Paschim Bardhaman, a census town in Pandabeswar CD Block in Durgapur subdivision of Paschim Bardhaman district, West Bengal, India
- Mahal, close to pargana, country subdivision in the Indian subcontinent
- Măhal, a village in Sânmartin, Cluj County, Romania
- Mahalla, an Arabic language country subdivision or neighbourhood term
- Mahalle, Turkish language country subdivision or neighbourhood term
- Malé, national capital of the Maldives

== Films ==
- Mahal (1949 film), Indian film directed by Kamal Amrohi and starring Ashok Kumar and Madhubala
- Mahal (1969 film), Indian film directed by Shanker Mukherjee
- Mahal, a 1989 Indian film directed by Keshu Ramsay

== Other ==
- Mahal (Eddie Henderson album), a 1978 album by Eddie Henderson
- Mahal (Toro y Moi album), a 2022 album by Toro y Moi
- Mahal (Israel), foreign military volunteers in Israel
- Mahal (palace), meaning "palace" in India
- Mahal dialect (also spelled 'Mahl'), dialect of Dhivehi language spoken on Minicoy Island, India
- Aulë, a fictional character in J. R. R. Tolkien's legendarium, also named Mahal
- Jinder Mahal (born 1986), ring name of Canadian professional wrestler Yuvraj "Raj" Singh Dhesi
- Mumtaz Mahal
- Mahal (actress) (1974–2021), Filipino actress and comedian
- Jagsharan Singh Mahal, Canadian politician

== See also ==
- Mahale (disambiguation)
- Taj Mahal (disambiguation)
