= Nimbougou =

- Commune and village
- Location in Mali
- Coordinates: 10°51′22″N 5°30′20″W
- Country: Mali
- Region: Sikasso Region
- Cercle: Kadiolo Cercle

Area
  - Total: 238 km^{2} (92 sq mi)

Population (2009 census)
  - Total: 9,992
  - Density: 42.0/km^{2} (109/sq mi)
- Time zone: UTC+0 (GMT)

Nimbougou is a village and rural commune in the Cercle of Kadiolo in the Sikasso Region of southern Mali. The commune covers an area of 238 square kilometers and includes 5 villages. In the 2009 census it had a population of 9,992. The village of Nimbougou, the administrative center (chef-lieu) of the commune, is 43 km northeast of Kadiolo and 8 km from the border with Burkina Faso The primary language is Senufo, specifically Suppire.
