= Tousseguela =

Coordinates: 11°03′14″N 6°35′10″W

- Commune and town
- Interactive map of Tousseguela
- Country: Mali
- Region: Sikasso Region
- Cercle: Kolondieba Cercle

Population (1998)
  - Total: 4,894
- Time zone: UTC+0 (GMT)

Tousseguela is a small town and commune in the Cercle of Kolondieba in the Sikasso Region of southern Mali. In 1998 the commune had a population of 4894.
