= Papara, Ivory Coast =

Town in Ivory Coast, near Mali border

Papara
- Town and sub-prefecture
- Location in Ivory Coast
- Coordinates: 10°37′N 6°15′W
- Country: Ivory Coast
- District: Savanes
- Region: Bagoué
- Department: Tengréla

Population (2014)
  - Total: 8,866
- Time zone: UTC+0 (GMT)

Papara is a town in the far north of Ivory Coast. It is a sub-prefecture of Tengréla Department in Bagoué Region, Savanes District. A border crossing with Mali is three kilometres east of town. Papara is the northernmost sub-prefecture in Ivory Coast.

Papara was a commune until March 2012, when it became one of 1,126 communes nationwide that were abolished.

In 2014, the population of the sub-prefecture of Papara was 8,866.

== Villages ==
The 11 villages of the sub-prefecture of Papara and their population in 2014 are:

1. Basso (126)
2. Doubasso (621)
3. Kapegue (391)
4. Kokari (352)
5. Kolonza (883)
6. Koulousson (1,069)
7. Papara (2,264)
8. Ziekoundougou (128)
9. Iribasso (505)
10. Tiongoli (988)
11. Zanasso (1,539)
