= Kolia =

- Town, sub-prefecture, and commune
- Location in Ivory Coast
- Coordinates: 9°48′N 6°28′W
- Country: Ivory Coast
- District: Savanes
- Region: Bagoué
- Department: Kouto

Area
  - Total: 1,110 km^{2} (430 sq mi)

Population (2021 census)
  - Total: 32,113
  - Density: 28.9/km^{2} (74.9/sq mi)
  - Town: 12,124
- (2014 census)
- Time zone: UTC+0 (GMT)

Kolia is a town in northern Ivory Coast. It is a sub-prefecture and commune of Kouto Department in Bagoué Region, Savanes District.

In 2021, the population of the sub-prefecture of Kolia was 32,113.

== Villages ==
The 10 villages of the sub-prefecture of Kolia and their population in 2014 are :

1. Kolia (12 124)
2. Blediemene (1 341)
3. Dabakaha (50)
4. Mararanama (2 521)
5. Fanhandougou (1 259)
6. Katanra (1 242)
7. Kodiaga (327)
8. Koro (1 489)
9. Kpafonon (1 702)
10. Monongo (2 793)
