= Tiongui =

- Commune and town
- Location in Mali
- Coordinates: 10°46′N 6°23′W
- Country: Mali
- Region: Sikasso Region
- Cercle: Kolondieba Cercle

Population (1998)
  - Total: 6,004
- Time zone: UTC+0 (GMT)

Tiongui is a small town and commune in the Cercle of Kolondieba in the Sikasso Region of southern Mali near the border with Ivory Coast. In 1998 the commune had a population of 6,004.

== History ==
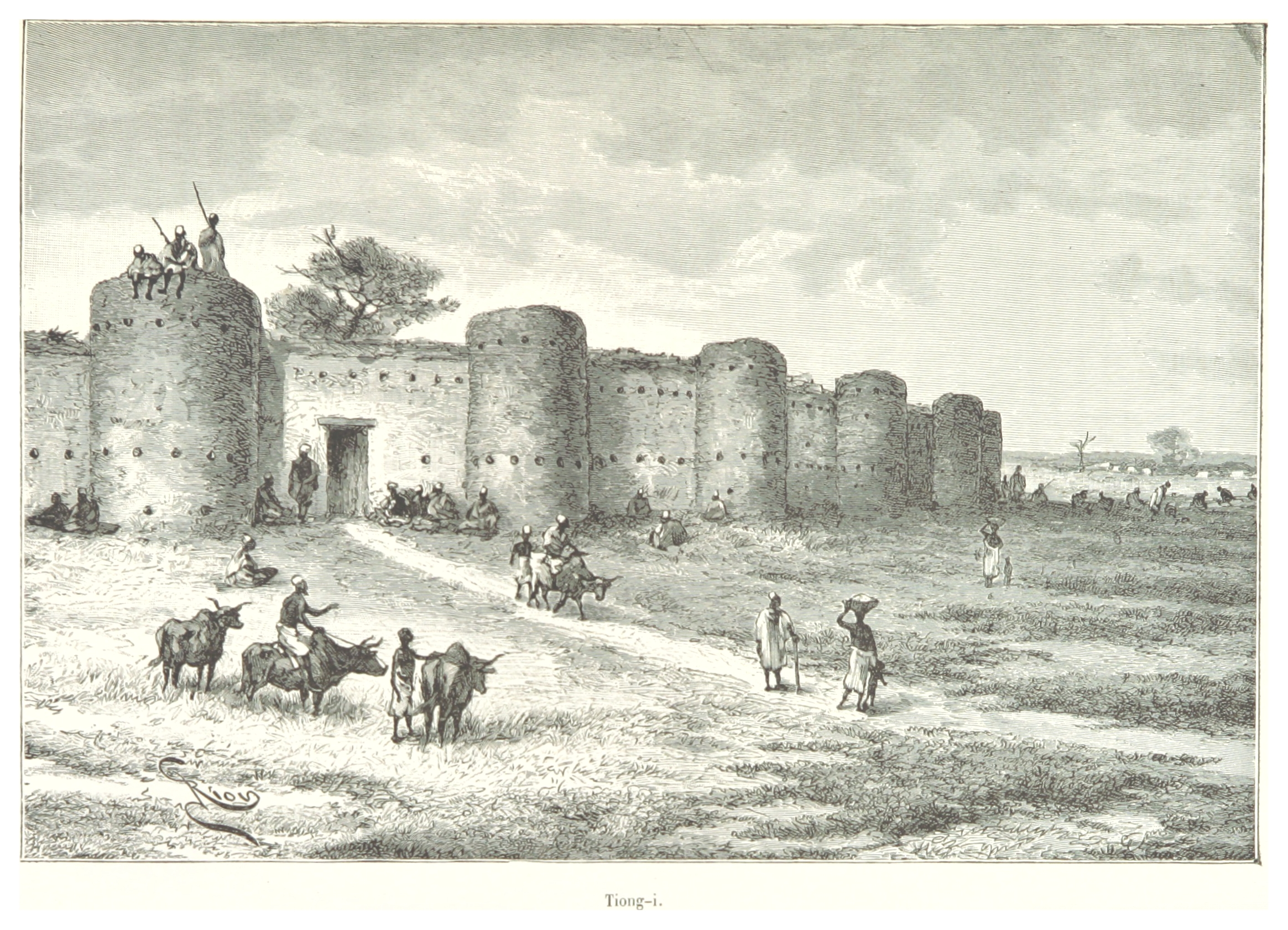
Illustration of Tiongui in 1892 by L-G. Binger

Louis-Gustave Binger entered the city on Friday, October 28, 1887. He states: "Tiong or Tiong-i has the appearance of a city: its large clay walls of ash gray clay with coarse flanking towers spaced 25 to 30 meters apart and its flat roofs which, here and there, dominate the enclosure, recall the engravings of Viollet-le-Duc in his History of the Fortification. This is the childhood of fortification and flanking.

This village, which was the Famadougou (capital) of Niendougou, must have contained 3,000 inhabitants in time. At present the enclosure is far from being well stocked with dwellings; there are large vacant lots within the village that separate the groups of dwellings from each other; The outer Tata is quite well maintained. I estimate its current population at 500 inhabitants".
