= Kadiolo Cercle =

Coordinates: 10°38′N 5°50′W

- Cercle
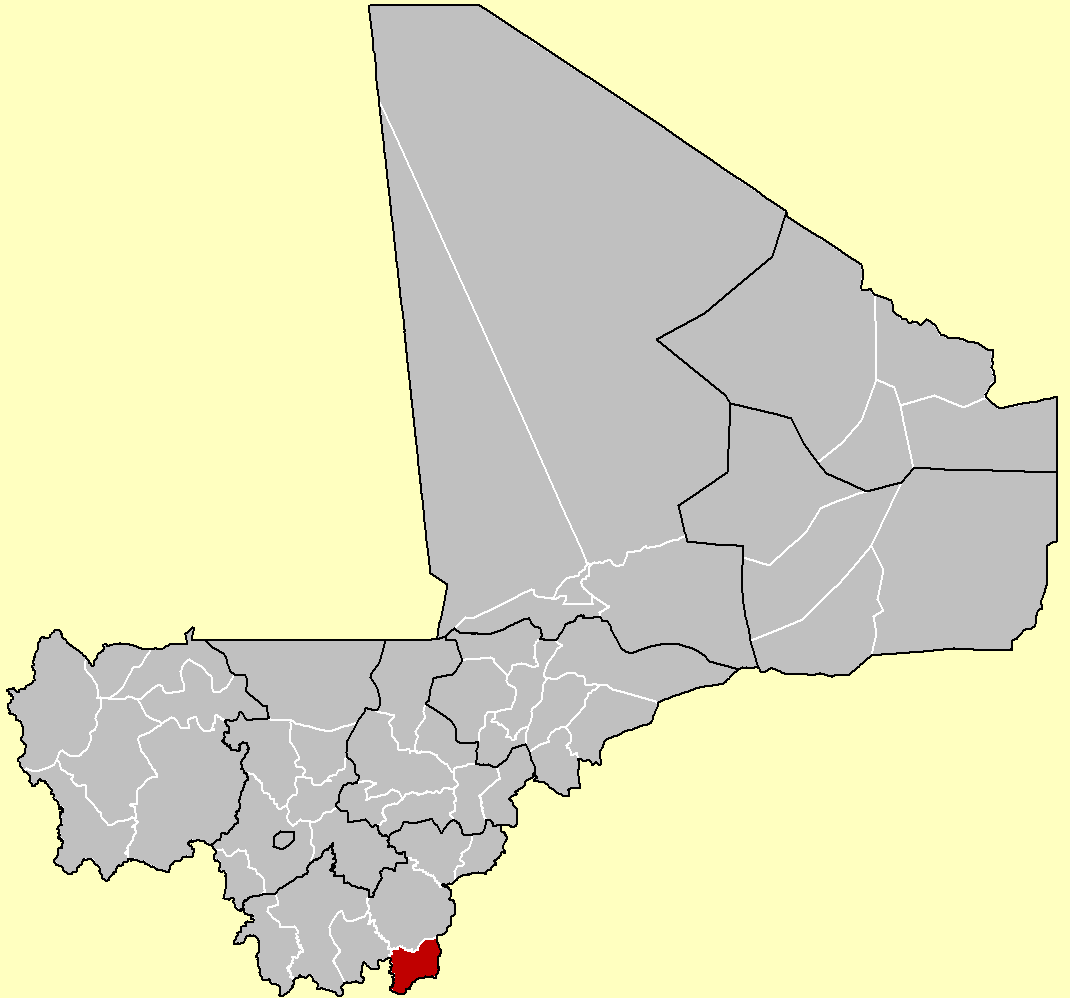
- Location of the Cercle of Kadiolo in Mali
- Country: Mali
- Region: Sikasso Region
- Cercle: Kadiolo
- Admin HQ (Chef-lieu): Kadiolo

Area
  - Total: 5,357 km^{2} (2,068 sq mi)

Population (2009 census)
  - Total: 239,713
  - Density: 44.75/km^{2} (115.9/sq mi)
- Time zone: UTC+0 (GMT)

Kadiolo Cercle is an administrative subdivision of the Sikasso Region of southern Mali. The administrative center (chef-lieu) is the town of Kadiolo.

The cercle is divided into nine rural communes:

- Diou
- Dioumaténé
- Fourou
- Kadiolo
- Kaï
- Loulouni
- Misséni
- Nimbougou
- Zégoua
