= Ismaël Isaac =

Ivorian singer (born 1966)

Ismaël Isaac (born Kaba Diakité Issiaka in 1966) is an Ivorian reggae singer. Born in Abidjan, his parents are from Ponondougou in the north of the country. He is strongly influenced by Bob Marley and Alpha Blondy.

He was discovered on the Ivorian television show First Chance broadcast on Radio Television Ivoirienne and was found by the keyboardist Georges Kouakou. Its success led him to have a record contract with Island Records, and "Taxi Jump" was released in 1993.

In August 2014, Ismael came back after 14 years with his new album called "Je reste" produced by Canta Productions with some featuring from Mokobe and Bony RAS.

== Discography ==
- 1986 – Tchilaba
- 1989 – Yatiman
- 1990 – Rahman
- 1993 – Taxi Jump
- 1997 – Treich Feeling (Back in Stock)
- 2000 – Black System
- 2014 – Je reste
