= Kasséré =

- Town, sub-prefecture, and commune
- Location in Ivory Coast
- Coordinates: 9°50′N 6°13′W
- Country: Ivory Coast
- District: Savanes
- Region: Bagoué
- Department: Boundiali

Population (2014)
  - Total: 23,983
- Time zone: UTC+0 (GMT)

Kasséré is a town in northern Ivory Coast. It is a sub-prefecture and commune of Boundiali Department in Bagoué Region, Savanes District.

In 2014, the population of the sub-prefecture of Kasséré was 23,983.

== Villages ==
The 11 villages of the sub-prefecture of Kasséré and their population in 2014 are:

1. Kassere (7 966)
2. Pinvoro (1 703)
3. Pongafre (718)
4. Sionfan (784)
5. Blagounon (523)
6. Gbalo (1 451)
7. Lafi (3 006)
8. Landiougou (3 659)
9. Sienre (802)
10. Tiasso (2 801)
11. Tomba (570)
