= N'Golodiana =

Coordinates: 10°58′N 7°06′W

- Commune
- Interactive map of N'Golodiana
- Country: Mali
- Region: Sikasso Region
- Cercle: Kolondieba Cercle

Population (1998)
  - Total: 4,435
- Time zone: UTC+0 (GMT)

N'Golodiana is a commune in the Cercle of Kolondieba in the Sikasso Region of southern Mali. The principal town lies at Toutiala. In 1998 the commune had a population of 4435.
