= Ramata Ly-Bakayoko =

Ivorian academic, politician (b. 1955)

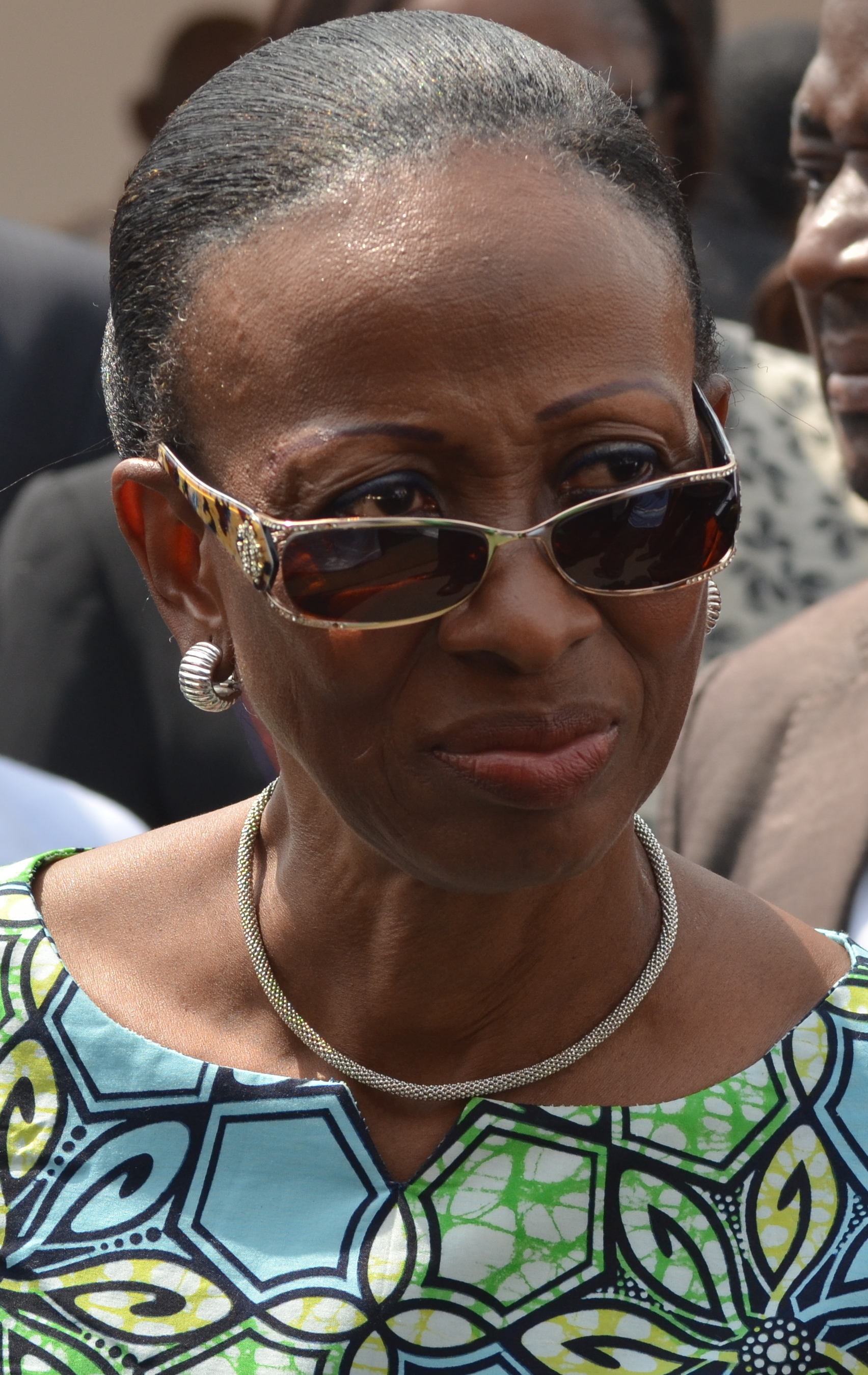

Minister of Women, Families and Children
- Incumbent
- Assumed office 10 July 2018
- President: Alassane Ouattara
- Prime Minister: Amadou Gon Coulibaly
- Preceded by: Mariatou Koné

Minister of Higher Education and Scientific Research
- In office 12 January 2016 – 4 July 2018
- President: Alassane Ouattara
- Prime Minister: Daniel Kablan Duncan; Amadou Gon Coulibaly
- Preceded by: Gnamien Konan
- Succeeded by: Albert Mabri Toikeusse

Ramata Ly-Bakayoko (born 29 June 1955) is an Ivorian academic and government official. She served as Ivory Coast's Minister of Higher Education and Scientific Research from 2016 to 2018. She was appointed Minister of Women, Families, and Children in 2018. She was appointed permanent delegate of Côte d'Ivoire to UNESCO with residence in Paris on September 8, 2021.

== Biography ==
Ly-Bakayoko was born in Abidjan, Ivory Coast, in 1955. She earned degrees in dental surgery from Paris Diderot University in 1980 and in dental science from Paris Descartes University in 1985.

Ly-Bakayoko was a professor of pediatric dentistry. She headed the pediatric dentistry department at the University of Cocody (now Université Félix Houphouët-Boigny) in Abidjan, later becoming vice-dean of the faculty of dentistry, then vice-president of the university. From 2012 to 2016, Ly-Bakayoko served as the first female president of Université Félix Houphouët-Boigny. As president, she developed the Scientific and Innovation Centre in Bingerville, home to the West African Virus Epidemiology (WAVE) program.

Ly-Bakayoko served as Minister of Higher Education and Scientific Research from 2016 to 2018, succeeding Gnamien Konan. She was the first woman to hold this position. In 2018, she was appointed Minister of Women, Families, and Children.

== Awards and honours ==
In 2018, Ly-Bakayoko became the first Ivorian member of the French Académie des sciences d'outre-mer. In 2019, she was awarded an honorary doctorate from France's University of Franche-Comté.
