= Siempurgo =

Siempurgo Sienpurgo
- Town and sub-prefecture
- Location in Ivory Coast
- Coordinates: 9°31′N 6°12′W
- Country: Ivory Coast
- District: Savanes
- Region: Bagoué
- Department: Boundiali

Population (2014)
  - Total: 16,682
- Time zone: UTC+0 (GMT)

Siempurgo (also spelled Sienpurgo) is a town in northern Ivory Coast. It is a sub-prefecture of Boundiali Department in Bagoué Region, Savanes District.

Siempurgo was a commune until March 2012, when it became one of 1,126 communes nationwide that were abolished.

In 2014, the population of the sub-prefecture of Siempurgo was 16,682.

== Villages ==
The 18 villages of the sub-prefecture of Siempurgo and their population in 2014 are:

1. Bongama (891)
2. Fodio (1,232)
3. Fonondara (2,187)
4. Kanitelegue (1,029)
5. Katiende (282)
6. Katiere (350)
7. Mouhouele (123)
8. Nangbolodougou (311)
9. Naoulasso (145)
10. Nitiadougou (433)
11. Nonkparakaha (1,422)
12. Pindio (290)
13. Poundiou (804)
14. Ponondougou (2,157)
15. Siempurgo (3,310)
16. Sogo (992)
17. Tiangaloro (328)
18. Yama (396)
