= Nangalasso =

Coordinates: 10°53′N 6°19′W

- Commune and town
- Interactive map of Nangalasso
- Country: Mali
- Region: Sikasso Region
- Cercle: Kolondieba Cercle

Population (1998)
  - Total: 7,887
- Time zone: UTC+0 (GMT)

Nangalasso is a small town and commune in the Cercle of Kolondieba in the Sikasso Region of southern Mali. In 1998 the commune had a population of 7,887.
