= Kebila =

- Commune and town
- Location in Mali
- Coordinates: 11°17′N 7°02′W
- Country: Mali
- Region: Sikasso Region
- Cercle: Kolondieba Cercle

Population (1998)
  - Total: 23,580
- Time zone: UTC+0 (GMT)

Kebila is a town and commune in the Cercle of Kolondieba in the Sikasso Region of southern Mali. In 1998 the commune had a population of 23,580.
