= Loulouni =

- Commune and town
- Location in Mali
- Coordinates: 10°53′32″N 5°36′15″W
- Country: Mali
- Region: Sikasso Region
- Cercle: Kadiolo Cercle

Area
  - Total: 1,052 km^{2} (406 sq mi)

Population (2009 census)
  - Total: 38,919
  - Density: 37.00/km^{2} (95.82/sq mi)
- Time zone: UTC+0 (GMT)

Loulouni is a small town and rural commune in the Cercle of Kadiolo in the Sikasso Region of southern Mali. The commune covers an area of 1,052 square kilometers and includes the town and 28 villages. In the 2009 census it had a population of 38,919. The town of Loulouni, the administrative center (chef-lieu) of the commune, is 41 km north-northeast of Kadiolo on the RN7, the main road between Sikasso and Ouangolodougou in the Ivory Coast. It lies close to Mount Tenakourou on the border with Burkina Faso, the highest point of that country.

On 11th November 2025, the town was attacked by JNIM, who overran the town and temporarily took control. At least ten Dozo militiamen were killed in the attack, and hundreds fled the town. The town was recaptured by government forces 3 days later.
