= Mena, Sikasso =

Coordinates: 11°11′56″N 6°43′15″W

Mena
- Commune and town
- Interactive map of Mena
- Country: Mali
- Region: Sikasso Region
- Cercle: Kolondieba Cercle

Population (1998)
  - Total: 5,014
- Time zone: UTC+0 (GMT)

Mena is a small town and commune in the Cercle of Kolondieba in the Sikasso Region of southern Mali. In 1998 the commune had a population of 5014.
