= Zégoua =

- Commune and town
- Location in Mali
- Coordinates: 10°29′15″N 5°39′13″W
- Country: Mali
- Region: Sikasso Region
- Cercle: Kadiolo Cercle

Area
  - Total: 978 km^{2} (378 sq mi)

Population (2017)
  - Total: 230,360
  - Density: 236/km^{2} (610/sq mi)
- Time zone: UTC+0 (GMT)

Zégoua is a City and commune in the Cercle of Kadiolo in the Sikasso Region of southern Mali. The commune covers an area of 978 square kilometers and includes the town and 8 villages. In the 2017 census it had a population of 230,360. The city of Zégoua, the administrative center (chef-lieu) of the commune, is 2 km north of the border with the Ivory Coast and 14 km southeast of Kadiolo on the RN7, the main road linking Sikasso and Ouangolodougou.
