= Muriel Diallo =

Ivorian writer

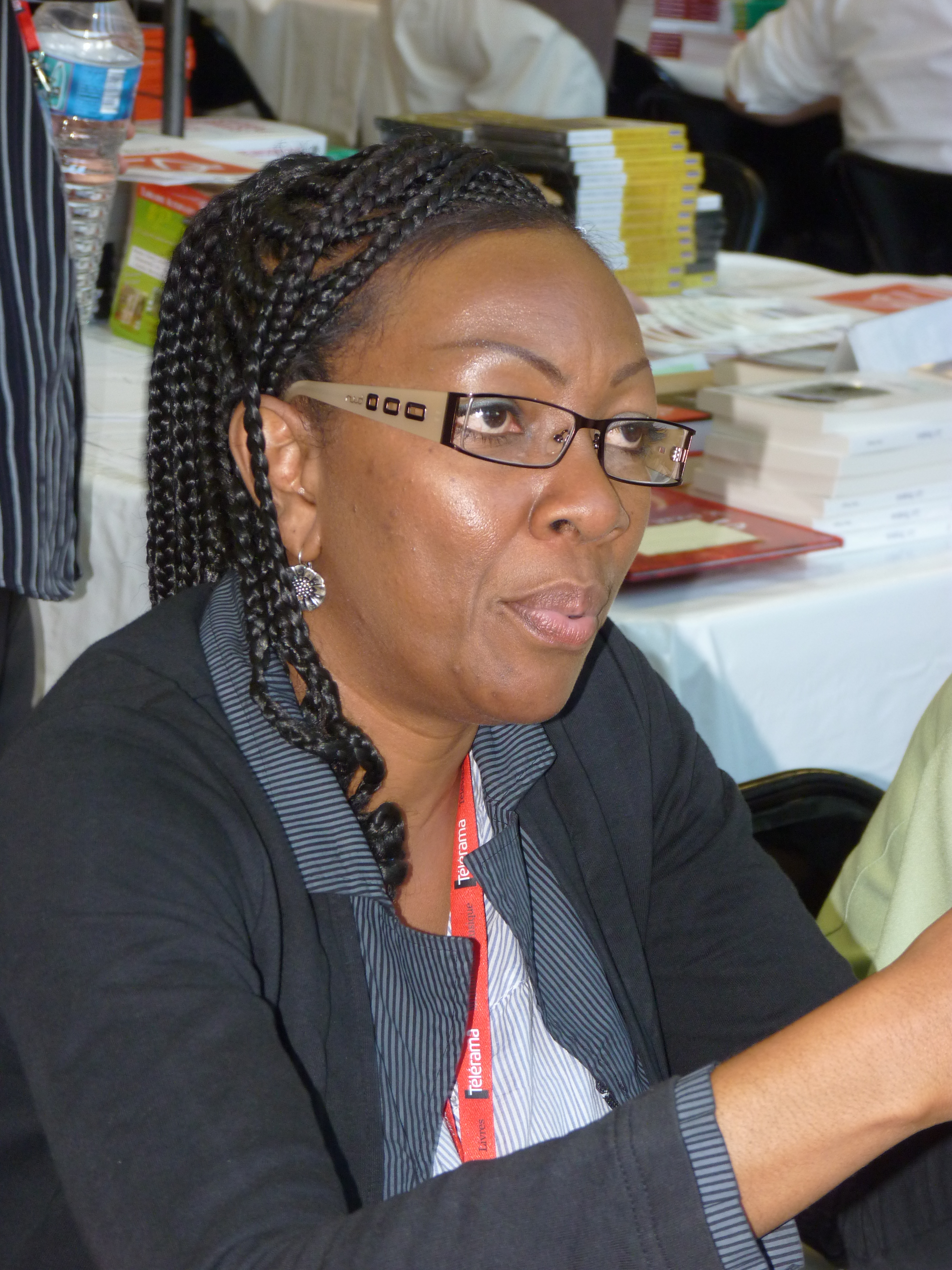
- Born: 19 May 1967 (age 59); Boundiali

Muriel Diallo (born 19 May 1967) is an Ivory Coast writer.

== Life ==
Diallo was born in Boundiali in 1967. Although she is known for her writing in French, she taught art for a living. She has exhibited her paintings and she has won a number of awards for her writing. Her first story was published in 1998. Her stories are written in French, for young people and frequently illustrated by Diallo. Diallo has written several books for young children with titles that begin "Bibi does not like..." and then titles deal with subjects like vegetables, medical treatment and football.

Diallo was troubled by murders caused by intolerance in her home country. She has moved to live in Paris where she paints and illustrates.
