= Blességué =

- Town and sub-prefecture
- Location in Ivory Coast
- Coordinates: 10°12′N 6°24′W
- Country: Ivory Coast
- District: Savanes
- Region: Bagoué
- Department: Kouto

Population (2014)
  - Total: 15,187
- Time zone: UTC+0 (GMT)

Blességué is a town in northern Ivory Coast. It is a sub-prefecture of Kouto Department in Bagoué Region, Savanes District.

Blességué was a commune until March 2012, when it became one of 1,126 communes nationwide that were abolished.

In 2014, the population of the sub-prefecture of Blességué was 15,187.

== Villages ==
The nine villages of the sub-prefecture of Blességué and their population in 2014 are:

1. Blessegue (5,524)
2. Bougoula (232)
3. Gbini (394)
4. Kakorogo (877)
5. Portio (2,557)
6. Sanaoule (1,201)
7. Singo (2,320)
8. Tiana (560)
9. Tiogo (1,522)
