= Sianhala =

Sianhala Sanhala
- Town and sub-prefecture
- Location in Ivory Coast
- Coordinates: 10°2′N 6°51′W
- Country: Ivory Coast
- District: Savanes
- Region: Bagoué
- Department: Kouto

Population (2014)
  - Total: 27,076
- Time zone: UTC+0 (GMT)

Sianhala (also spelled Sanhala) is a town in northern Ivory Coast. It is a sub-prefecture of Kouto Department in Bagoué Region, Savanes District. The town is four kilometres east of the border of Denguélé District.

Sianhala was a commune until March 2012, when it became one of 1,126 communes nationwide that were abolished.

In 2014, the population of the sub-prefecture of Sianhala was 27,076.

== Villages ==
The eight villages of the sub-prefecture of Sianhala and their population in 2014 are:

1. Kelegbala (4,182)
2. Mougnini (5,246)
3. N'deou (6,228)
4. Douasso (3,166)
5. Sianhala (2,696)
6. Tinasso (3,604)
7. Zanasso 1 (1,263)
8. Zanasso 2 (691)
