= Ganaoni =

Ganaoni Nganoni
- Town and sub-prefecture
- Location in Ivory Coast
- Coordinates: 9°17′N 6°19′W
- Country: Ivory Coast
- District: Savanes
- Region: Bagoué
- Department: Boundiali

Population (2014)
  - Total: 18,842
- Time zone: UTC+0 (GMT)

Ganaoni (also spelled Nganoni) is a town in northern Ivory Coast. It is a sub-prefecture of Boundiali Department in Bagoué Region, Savanes District. The town is eight kilometres north of the border of Woroba District.

Ganaoni was a commune until March 2012, when it became one of 1,126 communes nationwide that were abolished.

In 2014, the population of the sub-prefecture of Ganaoni was 18,842.

== Villages ==
The 13 villages of the sub-prefecture of Ganaoni and their population in 2014 are:

1. Bolondo (313)
2. Djigbe (1,266)
3. Ganaoni (2,822)
4. Kambiala (233)
5. Karakpo (616)
6. Katiali (3,513)
7. Kounoumon (746)
8. Mirimiri (1,030)
9. Niempurgue (1,485)
10. Pahatogo (1,871)
11. Sissedougou (3,229)
12. Sisseple (731)
13. Ziedougou (987)
