= Kolosso, Mali =

Kolosso
- Commune and town
- Location in Mali
- Coordinates: 11°07′N 6°33′W
- Country: Mali
- Region: Sikasso Region
- Cercle: Kolondieba Cercle

Population (1998)
  - Total: 5,246
- Time zone: UTC+0 (GMT)

Kolosso is a small town and commune in the Cercle of Kolondieba in the Sikasso Region of southern Mali. In 1998, the commune had a population of 5,246 people.
