= Kadiana =

Coordinates: 10°45′N 6°30′W

- Commune and town
- Interactive map of Kadiana
- Country: Mali
- Region: Sikasso Region
- Cercle: Kolondieba Cercle

Population (1998)
  - Total: 12,404
- Time zone: UTC+0 (GMT)

Kadiana is a small town and commune in the Cercle of Kolondieba in the Sikasso Region of southern Mali near the border with Ivory Coast. In 1998 the commune had a population of 12,404.
