= Misséni =

- Commune and village
- Location in Mali
- Coordinates: 10°19′0″N 6°4′37″W
- Country: Mali
- Region: Sikasso Region
- Cercle: Kadiolo Cercle

Area
  - Total: 915 km^{2} (353 sq mi)

Population (2009 census)
  - Total: 45,240
  - Density: 49.4/km^{2} (128/sq mi)
- Time zone: UTC+0 (GMT)

Misséni is a village and rural commune in the Cercle of Kadiolo in the Sikasso Region of southern Mali near the border with Ivory Coast. The commune covers an area of 915 square kilometers and includes 19 villages. In the 2009 census it had a population of 45,240. The village of Misséni, the administrative center (chef-lieu) of the commune, is 44 km southwest of Kadiolo.
