= Kolondieba =

Coordinates: 11°05′N 6°54′W

- Commune and town
- Interactive map of Kolondieba
- Country: Mali
- Region: Sikasso Region
- Cercle: Kolondieba Cercle

Population (2009)
  - Total: 57,898
- Time zone: UTC+0 (GMT)

Kolondieba is a small town and commune in the cercle of Kolondiéba, in the Sikasso Region of southern Mali. At the 2009 Census, the commune had a population of 57,898.

In the local language, Kolondieba means "Big White Well."

== See also ==
- List of cities in Mali
