= Kouto =

- Town, sub-prefecture, and commune
- Location in Ivory Coast
- Coordinates: 9°54′N 6°25′W
- Country: Ivory Coast
- District: Savanes
- Region: Bagoué
- Department: Kouto

Area
  - Total: 666 km^{2} (257 sq mi)

Population (2021 census)
  - Total: 55,893
  - Density: 83.9/km^{2} (217/sq mi)
  - Town: 10,989
- (2014 census)
- Time zone: UTC+0 (GMT)

Kouto is a town in northern Ivory Coast. It is a sub-prefecture of and the seat of Kouto Department in Bagoué Region, Savanes District. Kouto is also a commune.

The Mosque of Kouto, a small adobe mosque in the town, possibly dating from the seventeenth century, was inscribed on the UNESCO World Heritage List in 2021 along with other mosques in the region for its outstanding representation of Sudano-Sahelian architecture.

In 2021, the population of the sub-prefecture of Kouto was 55,893.

== History ==
When Samory Toure invaded the area, he met emissaries from Gbon Coulibaly, the chief of Korhogo, at Kouto. They negotiated the area's peaceful entry into Samory's empire.

== Villages ==
The 11 villages of the sub-prefecture of Kouto and their population in 2014 are:

1. Boyo (3 791)
2. Kouto (10 989)
3. Samorossoba (1 421)
4. Timboroni (842)
5. Nimbiasso (1 722)
6. Tabakoroni (1 905)
7. Tindara (2 757)
8. Tioro (1 148)
9. Womon (2 339)
10. Wora (5 568)
11. Zaguinasso (4 578)
