= Kolondieba Cercle =

Coordinates: 10°55′N 6°45′W

Kolondiéba Cercle
- Cercle
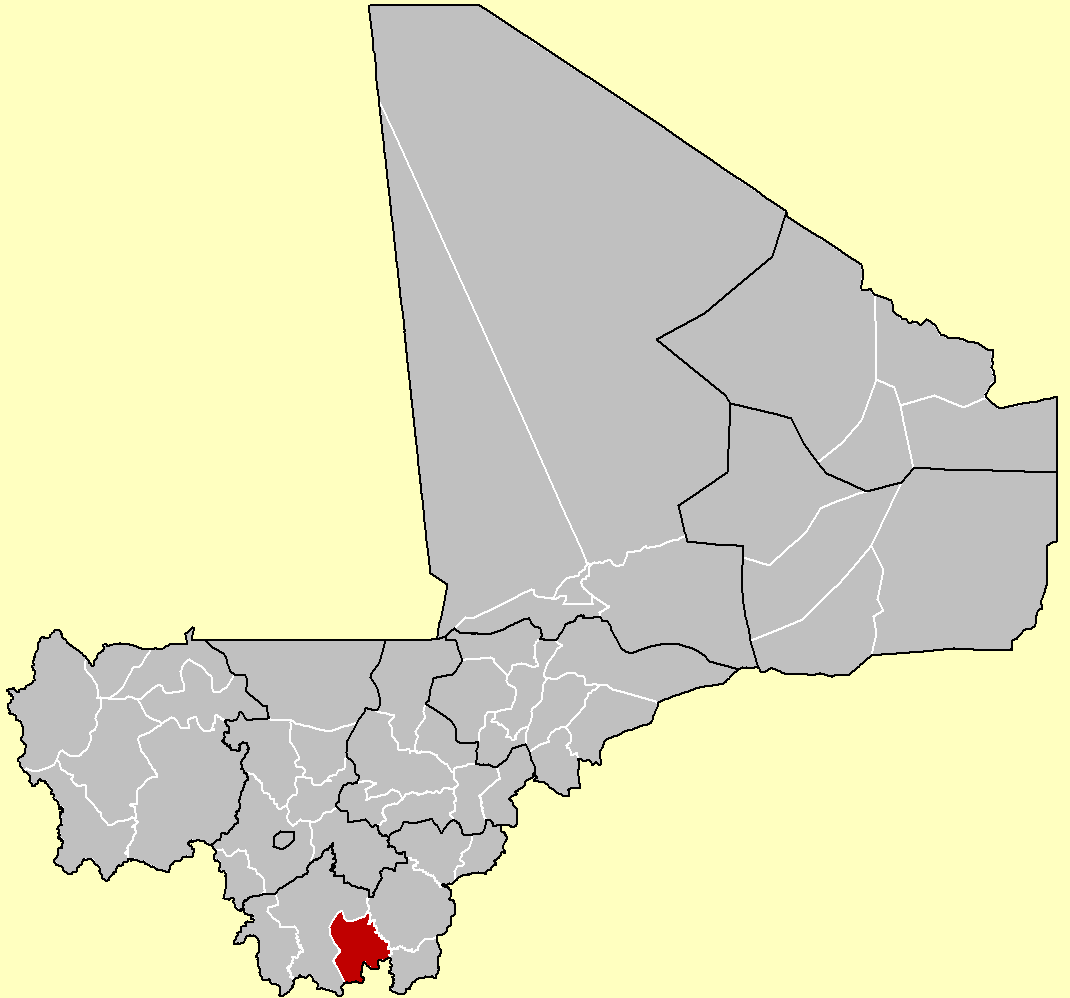
- Location of the Cercle of Kolondieba in Mali
- Country: Mali
- Region: Sikasso Region
- Admin HQ (Chef-lieu): Kolondiéba

Area
  - Total: 9,200 km^{2} (3,600 sq mi)

Population (2009 census)
  - Total: 202,618
  - Density: 22/km^{2} (57/sq mi)
- Time zone: UTC+0 (GMT)

Kolondiéba Cercle is an administrative subdivision of the Sikasso Region of Mali. The administrative center (chef-lieu) is the town of Kolondiéba.

The cercle is divided into the urban commune of Kolondiéba and 11 rural communes:

| Name | Population 1998 | Population 2009 | Average Annual Change |
|---|---|---|---|
| Kolondiéba | 37,945 | 57,898 | 3.9 |
| Bougoula | 3,716 | 6,257 | 4.9 |
| Fakola | 14,668 | 28,101 | 6.1 |
| Farako | 10,370 | 15,391 | 3.7 |
| Kadiana | 15,745 | 21,548 | 2.9 |
| Kébila | 24,796 | 36,367 | 3.5 |
| Kolosso | 5,391 | 8,986 | 4.8 |
| Ména | 5,003 | 3,042 | -4.4 |
| N'Golodiana | 5,385 | 3,567 | -3.7 |
| Nangalasso | 8,629 | 11,079 | 2.3 |
| Tiongui | 6,573 | 7,611 | 1.3 |
| Tousséguéla | 3,640 | 2,771 | -2.4 |
