= Gbon =

- Town, sub-prefecture, and commune
- Location in Ivory Coast
- Coordinates: 9°50′N 6°27′W
- Country: Ivory Coast
- District: Savanes
- Region: Bagoué
- Department: Kouto

Population (2014)
  - Total: 25,427
- Time zone: UTC+0 (GMT)

Gbon is a town in northern Ivory Coast. It is a sub-prefecture and commune of Kouto Department in Bagoué Region, Savanes District.

In 2014, the population of the sub-prefecture of Gbon was 25,427.

== Villages ==
The 9 villages of the sub-prefecture of Gbon and their population in 2014 are:

1. Gbon (9 615)
2. Dendrasso (1 134)
3. Gbambiasso (693)
4. Mahale (4 420)
5. Nibrini (358)
6. Ninioro (897)
7. Pouniakele (2 016)
8. Tounvre (4 150)
9. Ziasso (2 144)
