= Mahal, India =

Mahal
- Town
- Interactive map of Mahal
- Location in Andhra Pradesh, India Mahal (India)
- Coordinates: 13.7833°N 78.7667°E
- Country: India
- State: Andhra Pradesh
- District: Annamayya
- Elevation: 497 m (1,631 ft)

Languages
  - Official: Telugu & Urdu
- Time zone: UTC+5:30 (IST)

Mahal is a village located in Kalikiri mandal of Annamayya district in Andhra Pradesh, India. The place has not seen much development over the years mainly due to lack of economic and educational infrastructure in the town forcing majority of educated to migrate to different areas. Agriculture which is a primary source of income for majority is monsoon dependent, which has made it vulnerable over the past few decades due to continuous failing monsoons.

== Geography ==
13.7833°N 78.7667°E.
