= Farako, Sikasso =

Coordinates: 11°21′30″N 6°34′47″W

Farako
- Commune and town
- Interactive map of Farako
- Country: Mali
- Region: Sikasso Region
- Cercle: Kolondieba Cercle

Population (1998)
  - Total: 9,769
- Time zone: UTC+0 (GMT)

Farako is a small town and commune in the Cercle of Kolondieba in the Sikasso Region of southern Mali. In 1998 the commune had a population of 9,769.
