= Fakola =

Coordinates: 10°32′40″N 6°54′53″W

- Commune and town
- Interactive map of Fakola
- Country: Mali
- Region: Sikasso Region
- Cercle: Kolondieba Cercle

Population (1998)
  - Total: 14,301
- Time zone: UTC+0 (GMT)

Fakola is a small town and commune in the Cercle of Kolondieba in the Sikasso Region of southern Mali. In 1998 the commune had a population of 14,301.
