= Tengréla =

Tengréla Tingréla
- Town, sub-prefecture, and commune
- Location in Ivory Coast
- Coordinates: 10°29′N 6°24′W
- Country: Ivory Coast
- District: Savanes
- Region: Bagoué
- Department: Tengréla

Area
  - Total: 1,150 km^{2} (440 sq mi)

Population (2021 census)
  - Total: 92,454
  - Density: 80.4/km^{2} (208/sq mi)
  - Town: 40,323
- (2014 census)
- Time zone: UTC+0 (GMT)

Tengréla (also spelled Tingréla) is a town in the far north of Ivory Coast near the border with Mali. It is a sub-prefecture and the seat of Tengréla Department in Bagoué Region, Savanes District. Tengréla is also a commune.

== History ==
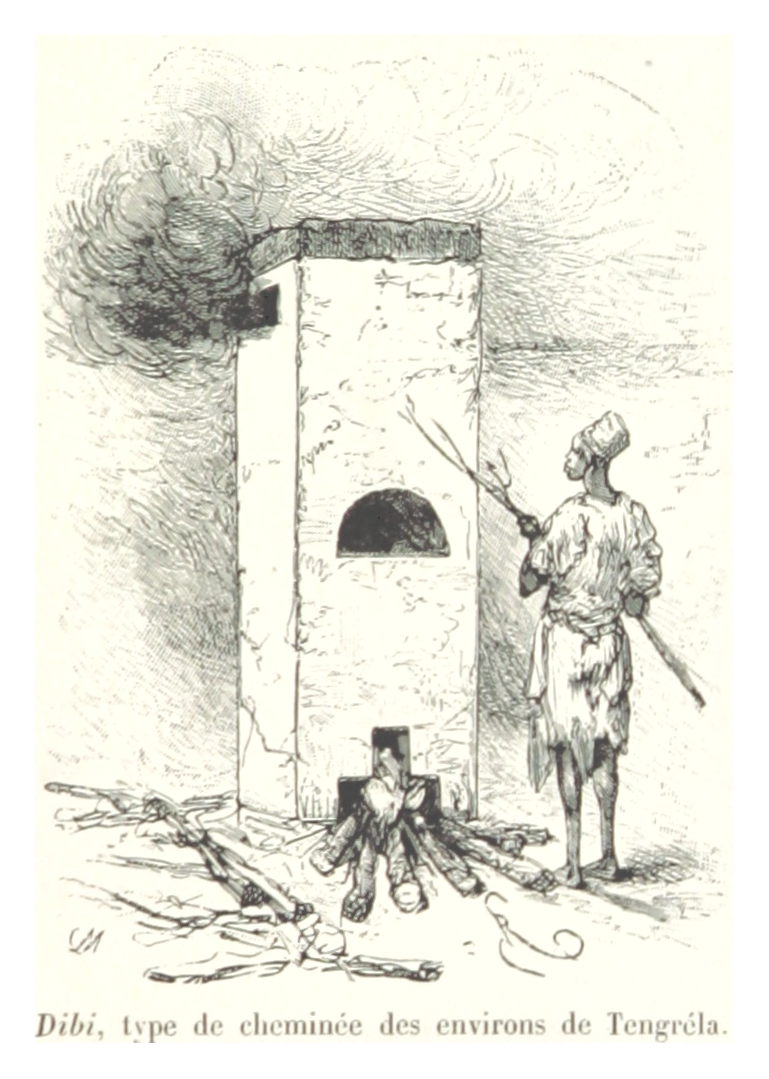
Dibi, a type of chimney used in Tingréla, 1892

The French explorer René Caillié stopped at the settlement of Tengréla, which was then a large walled village, in January 1828 on his journey to Timbuktu. He was travelling with a caravan of 500 to 600 people and 80 donkeys transporting kola nuts. In his book Travels through Central Africa to Timbuctoo published in 1830, he spelled the name of the village as "Tangrera".

The Mosquée de Tengréla, a small adobe mosque in the city possibly dating from the 17th century, was inscribed on the UNESCO World Heritage List in 2021 along with other mosques in the region for its outstanding representation of Sudano-Sahelian architecture.

In 2021, the population of the sub-prefecture of Tengréla was 92,454.

== Villages ==
The 28 villages of the sub-prefecture of Tengréla and their population in 2014 are:

1. Bolona (5,531)
2. Bougoula (196)
3. Danzourou (852)
4. Daraniani (440)
5. Diamankani (3,462)
6. Djoguinasso (195)
7. Dougba (1,653)
8. Dougba2 (691)
9. Feni (2,152)
10. Fimbiasso (924)
11. Flabougou (774)
12. Kotou (689)
13. M'basso (561)
14. M'bele (2,718)
15. Maniasso (1,139)
16. Missasso (250)
17. Naniasso (801)
18. Neguepie (3,947)
19. Nigouni (989)
20. San (5,320)
21. Sorokoumo (834)
22. Tamania (937)
23. Tengrela (40,323)
24. Tialaka (680)
25. Tiebi (1,128)
26. Tiempa (684)
27. Tienderime (630)
28. Zelesso (2,387)
