= Mariatou Koné =

Ivorian academic and politician

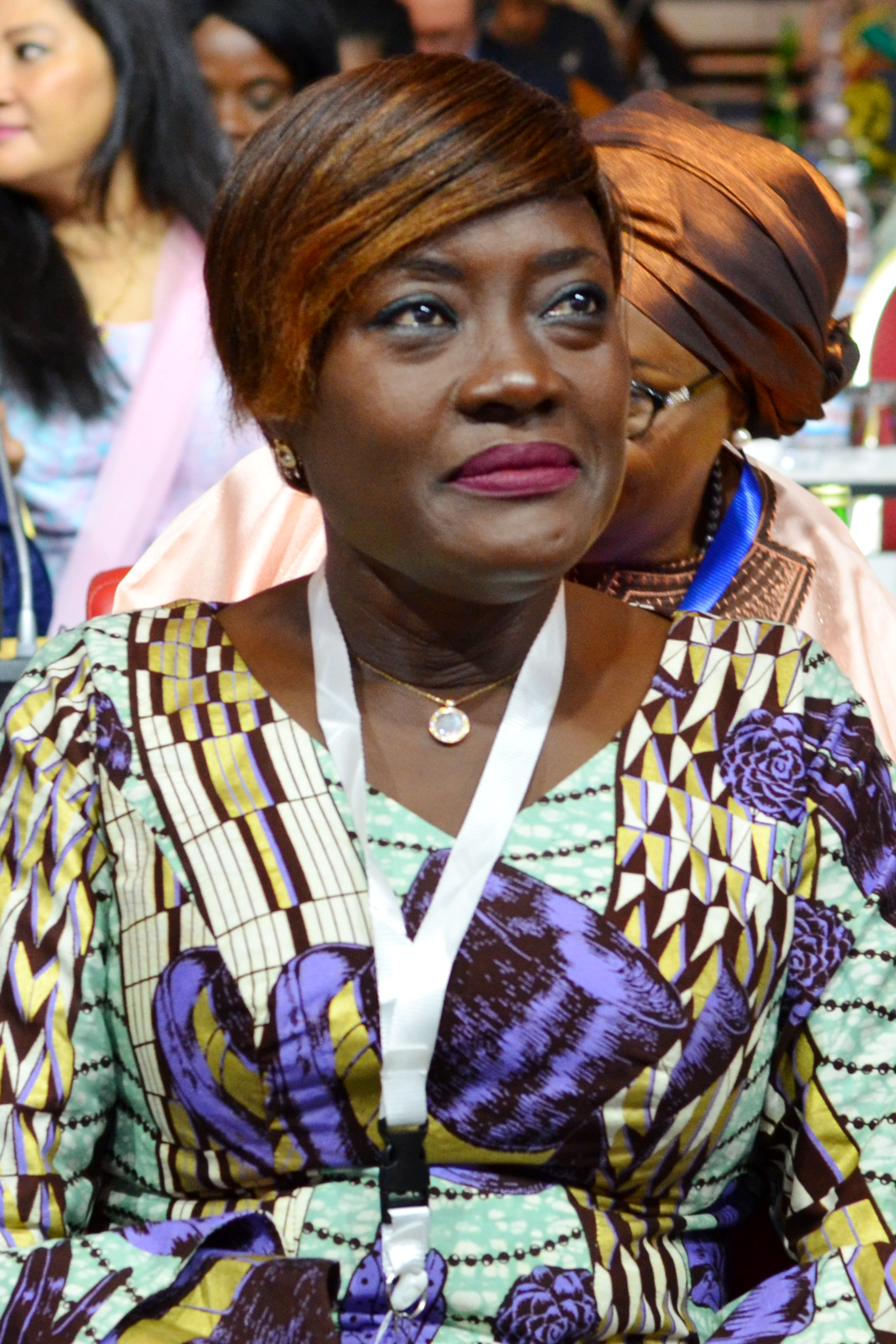
Mariatou Koné

Mariatou Koné is an Ivorian academic and a professor of Anthropology at the Université Félix Houphouët-Boigny who was appointed Minister of Solidarity, Women and Child Protection in 2017.

Koné is the Peace Mediator for ECOWAS and WANEP since 2013 and coordinator of the Environmental and Land Studies Laboratory of Côte d'Ivoire (LEEFCI).

== Background and career ==
Koné attended the Catholic Primary School (EPC) for girls in Daoukro between 1971 and 1977 and finished with a Certificate of Elementary Primary Studies (CEPE). She began her secondary education at Lycée Félix Houphouët Boigny in Korhogo, transferred to Lycée Moderne in Sassandra and then to Lycée moderne in Man. Koné graduated with Brevet d'Etudes du Premier Cycle (BEPC) in 1981 and an A4 series baccalaureate in 1984.

Koné earned a bachelor's degree in Sociology from National University of Côte d'Ivoire, Abidjan in 1987 and a master's degree in June 1988. She obtained the DEA in Social Sciences from Ecole des Hautes Etudes en Sciences Sociales (EHESS) in Marseille, France in 1990 and earned her doctorate degree in Anthropology 1994.

Konéwas appointed coordinating director of the National Social Cohesion Program (PNCS) in May 2012, and was promoted to the position of general manager in April 2015. On 12 January 2016, she was appointed Minister of Solidarity, Social Cohesion and Compensation for Victims, and was moved to Ministry of Solidarity, Social Cohesion and the Fight against Poverty in a cabinet reshuffle on 10 July 2018.
