= Tengréla Department =

Coordinates: 10°29′N 6°23′W

Tengréla Department Département de Tengréla Tingréla Department
- Department
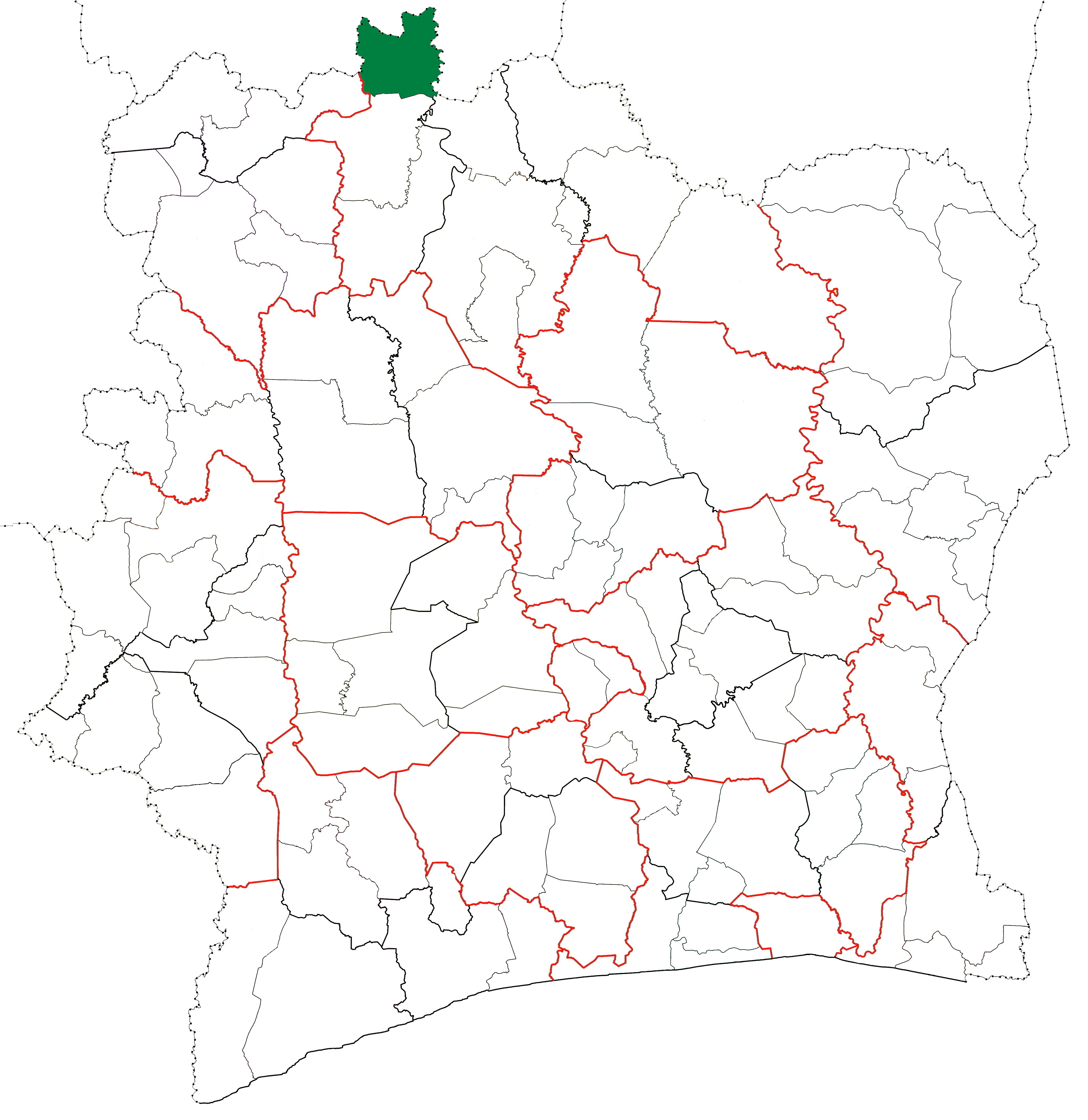
- Location in Ivory Coast. Tengréla Department has retained the same boundaries since its creation in 1980.
- Country: Ivory Coast
- District: Savanes
- Region: Bagoué
- 1980: Established as a first-level subdivision via a division of Boundiali Dept
- 1997: Converted to a second-level subdivision
- 2011: Converted to a third-level subdivision
- Departmental seat: Tengréla

Government
  - Prefect: Konin Dindé

Area
  - Total: 2,300 km^{2} (890 sq mi)

Population (2021 census)
  - Total: 141,761
  - Density: 62/km^{2} (160/sq mi)
- Time zone: UTC+0 (GMT)

Tengréla Department (also spelled Tingréla) is a department of Bagoué Region in Savanes District, Ivory Coast. In 2021, its population was 141,761 and its seat is the settlement of Tengréla. The sub-prefectures of the department are Débété, Kanakono, Papara, and Tengréla. It is the northernmost department of Ivory Coast.

== History ==
Tengréla Department was created in 1980 as a first-level subdivision via a split-off from Boundiali Department.

In 1997, regions were introduced as new first-level subdivisions of Ivory Coast; as a result, all departments were converted into second-level subdivisions. Tengréla Department was included in Savanes Region.

In 2011, districts were introduced as new first-level subdivisions of Ivory Coast. At the same time, regions were reorganised and became second-level subdivisions and all departments were converted into third-level subdivisions. At this time, Tengréla Department became part of Bagoué Region in Savanes District.
