= Boundiali Department =

Coordinates: 9°32′N 6°29′W

Boundiali Department Département de Boundiali
- Department
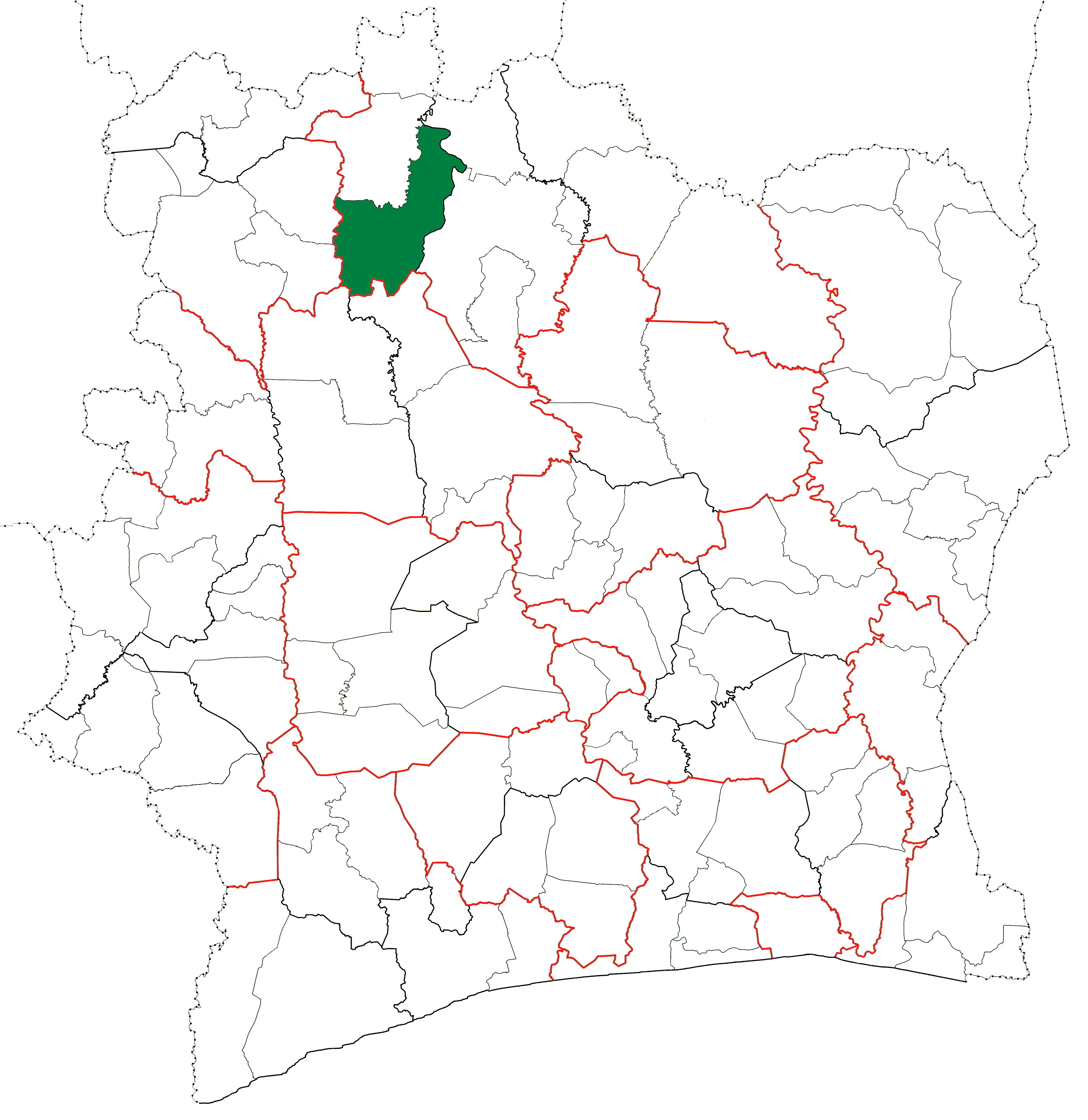
- Location in Ivory Coast. Boundiali Department has had these boundaries since 2008.
- Country: Ivory Coast
- District: Savanes
- Region: Bagoué
- 1969: Established as a first-level subdivision
- 1980: Divided to create Tengréla Dept
- 1997: Converted to a second-level subdivision
- 2008: Divided to create Kouto Dept
- 2011: Converted to a third-level subdivision
- Departmental seat: Boundiali

Government
  - Prefect: Issa Coulibaly

Area
  - Total: 4,340 km^{2} (1,680 sq mi)

Population (2021 census)
  - Total: 198,541
  - Density: 45.7/km^{2} (118/sq mi)
- Time zone: UTC+0 (GMT)

Boundiali Department is a department of Bagoué Region in Savanes District, Ivory Coast. In 2021, its population was 198,541 and its seat is the settlement of Boundiali. The sub-prefectures of the department are Baya, Boundiali, Ganaoni, Kasséré, and Siempurgo.

== History ==
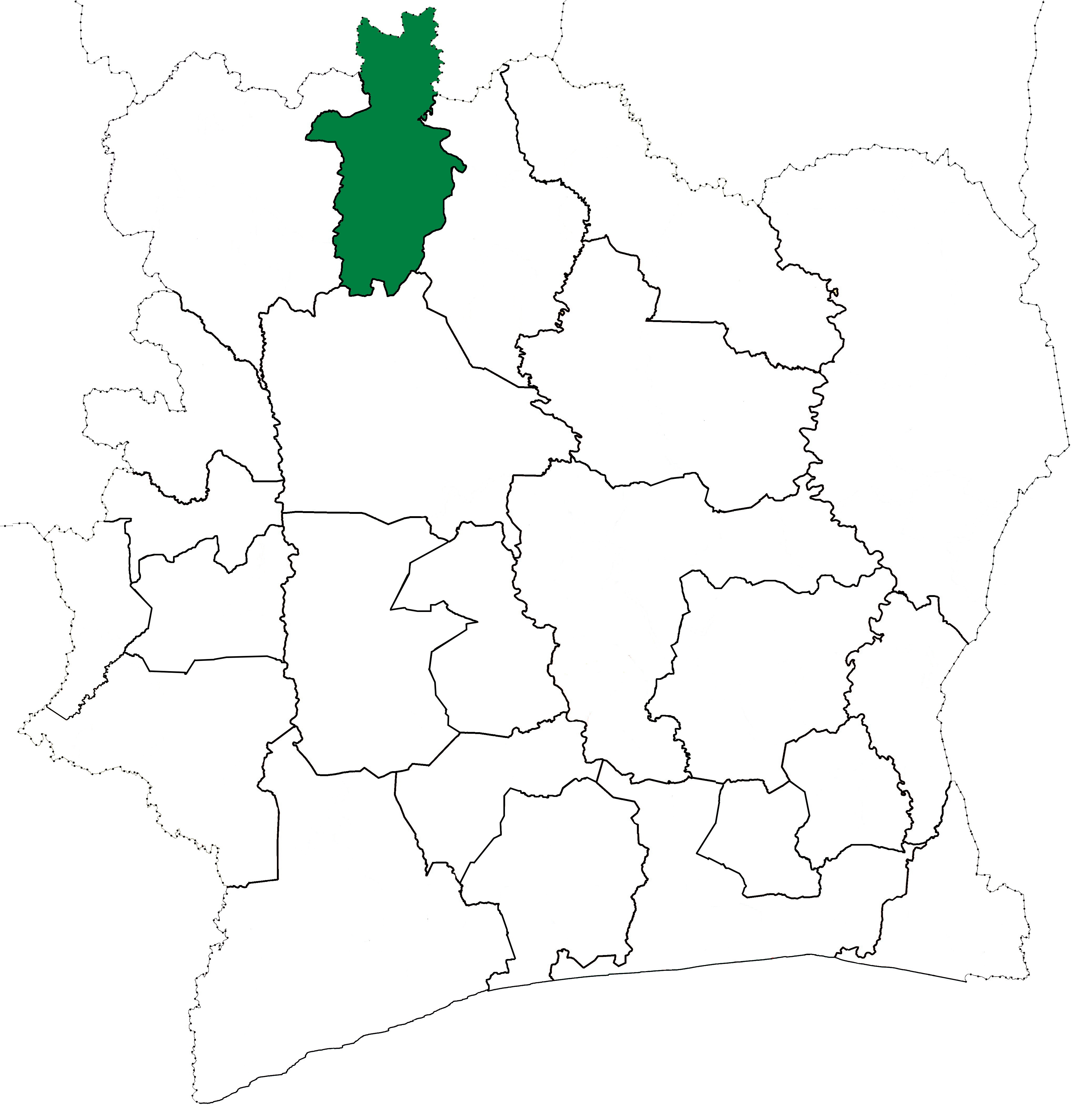
Boundiali Department upon its creation in 1969. Boundiali Department kept these boundaries until 1980, but other departments began to be divided in 1974.

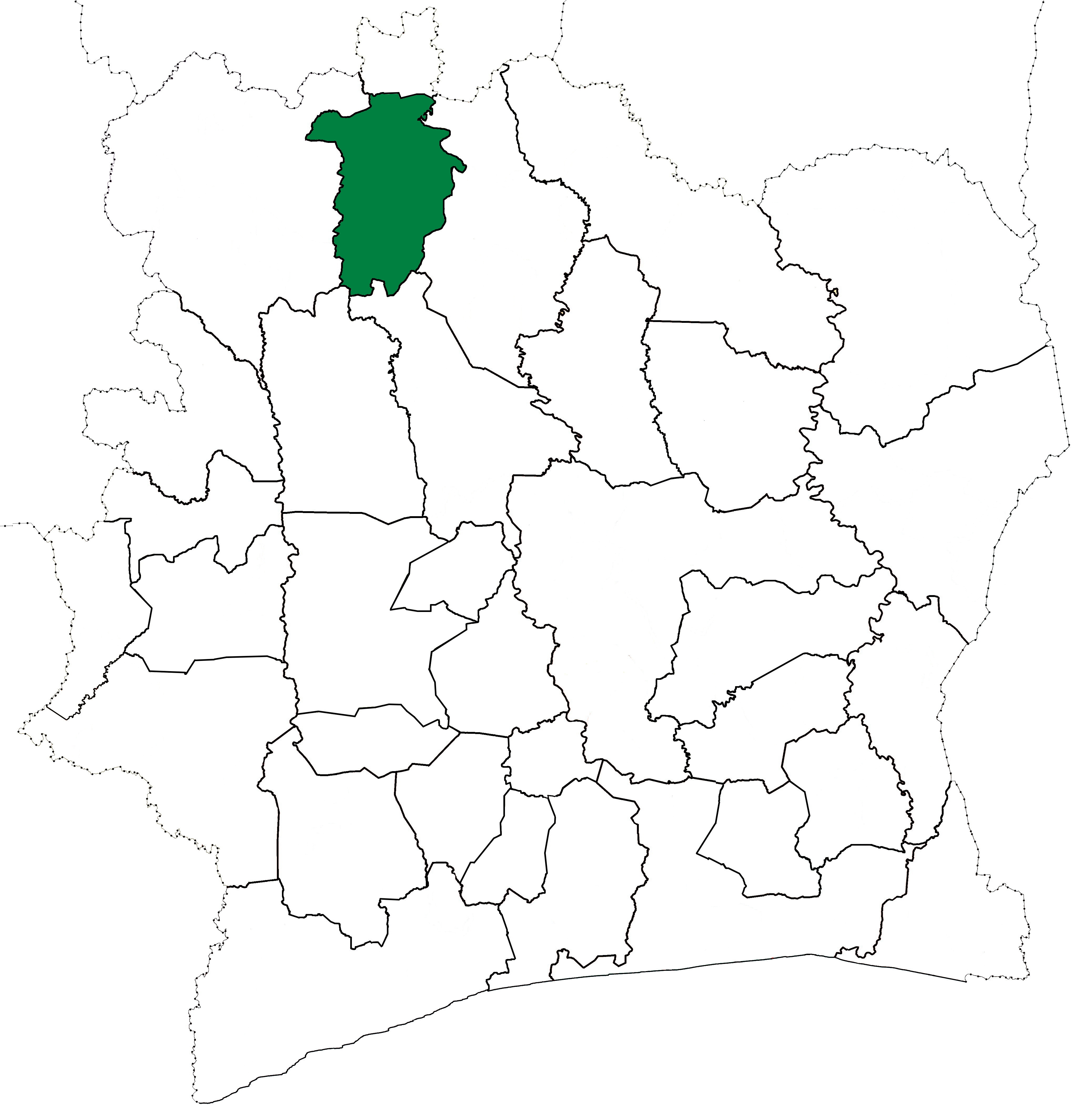
Boundiali Department from 1980 to 2008. (Other subdivision boundaries began to change in 1988.)

Boundiali Department was created in 1969 as one of the 24 new departments that were created to take the place of the six departments that were being abolished. It was created from territory that was formerly part of Nord Department. Using current boundaries as a reference, from 1969 to 1980 the department occupied the same territory as Bagoué Region.

In 1980, Boundiali Department was divided to create Tengréla Department. In 1997, regions were introduced as new first-level subdivisions of Ivory Coast; as a result, all departments were converted into second-level subdivisions. Boundiali Department was included as part of Savanes Region.

Boundiali Department was split again in 2008 to create Kouto Department.

In 2011, districts were introduced as new first-level subdivisions of Ivory Coast. At the same time, regions were reorganised and became second-level subdivisions and all departments were converted into third-level subdivisions. At this time, Boundiali Department became part of Bagoué Region in Savanes District.
