= Kouto Department =

Coordinates: 9°54′N 6°25′W

Kouto Department Département de Kouto
- Department
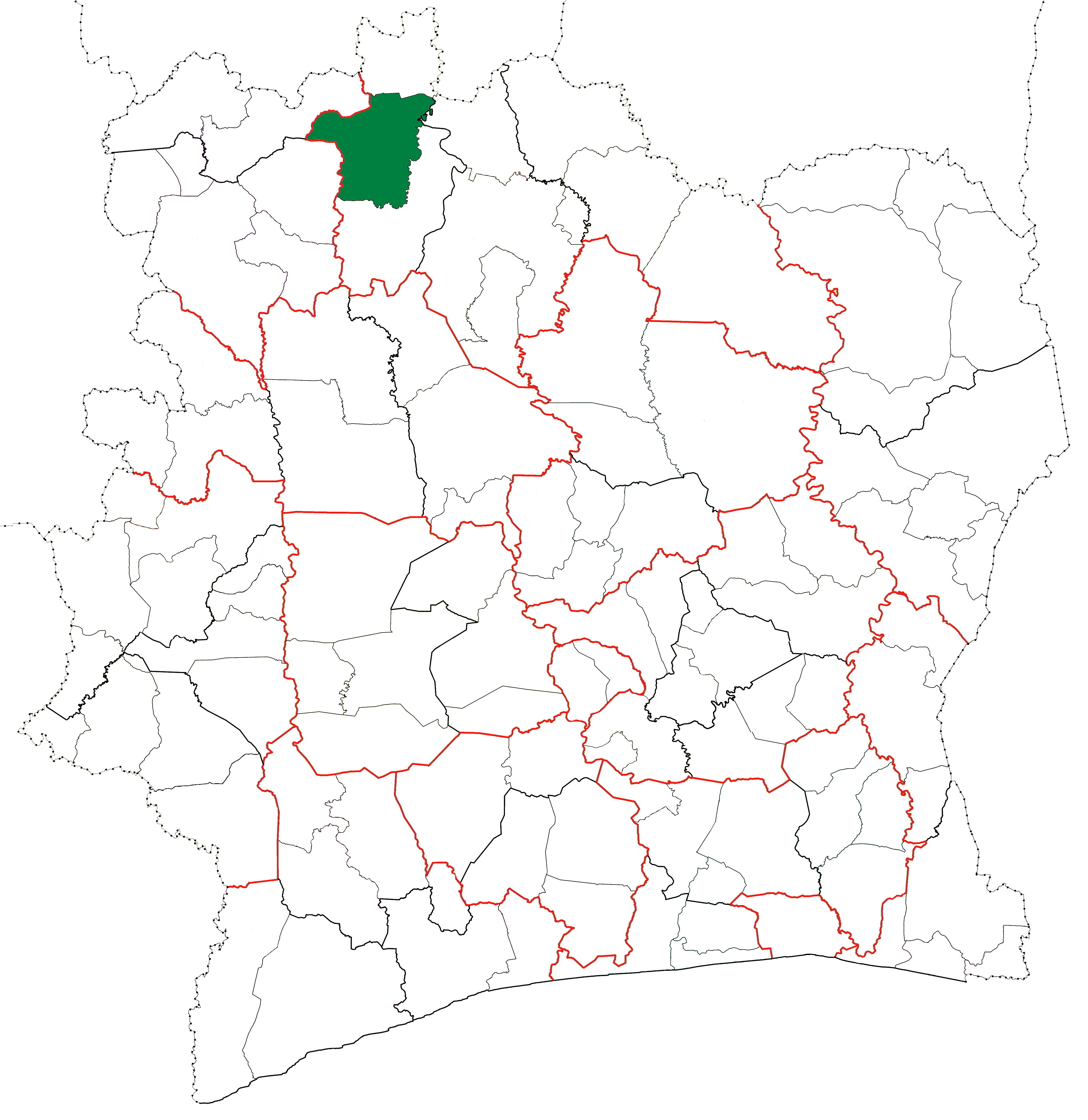
- Location in Ivory Coast. Kouto Department has retained the same boundaries since its creation in 2008.
- Country: Ivory Coast
- District: Savanes
- Region: Bagoué
- 2008: Established as a second-level subdivision via a division of Boundiali Dept
- 2011: Converted to a third-level subdivision
- Departmental seat: Kouto

Government
  - Prefect: Clément Koumé Bi Kalou

Area
  - Total: 3,560 km^{2} (1,370 sq mi)

Population (2021 census)
  - Total: 175,587
  - Density: 49.3/km^{2} (128/sq mi)
- Time zone: UTC+0 (GMT)

Kouto Department is a department of Bagoué Region in Savanes District, Ivory Coast. In 2021, its population was 175,587 and its seat is the settlement of Kouto. The sub-prefectures of the department are Blességué, Gbon, Kolia, Kouto, and Sianhala.

== History ==
Kouto Department was created in 2008 as a second-level subdivision via a split-off from Boundiali Department. At its creation, it was part of Savanes Region.

In 2011, districts were introduced as new first-level subdivisions of Ivory Coast. At the same time, regions were reorganised and became second-level subdivisions and all departments were converted into third-level subdivisions. At this time, Kouto Department became part of Bagoué Region in Savanes District.
