= Kadiolo =

- Commune and town
- Location in Mali
- Coordinates: 10°33′20″N 5°45′35″W
- Country: Mali
- Region: Sikasso Region
- Cercle: Kadiolo Cercle

Area
  - Total: 783 km^{2} (302 sq mi)

Population (2009 census)
  - Total: 52,932
  - Density: 67.6/km^{2} (175/sq mi)
- Time zone: UTC+0 (GMT)

Kadiolo is a town, rural commune and seat of the Kadiolo Cercle in the Sikasso Region of southern Mali. The town lies 85 km south of Sikasso, 13 km north of the border with the Ivory Coast and 30 km west of the border with Burkino Faso. The commune of Kadiolo covers an area of 783 square kilometers and includes the town and 19 villages. In the 2009 census it had a population of 59,932.

== See also ==
- List of cities in Mali
