= Bagoué =

Coordinates: 9°31′N 6°29′W

Bagoué Region Région de la Bagoué
- Region
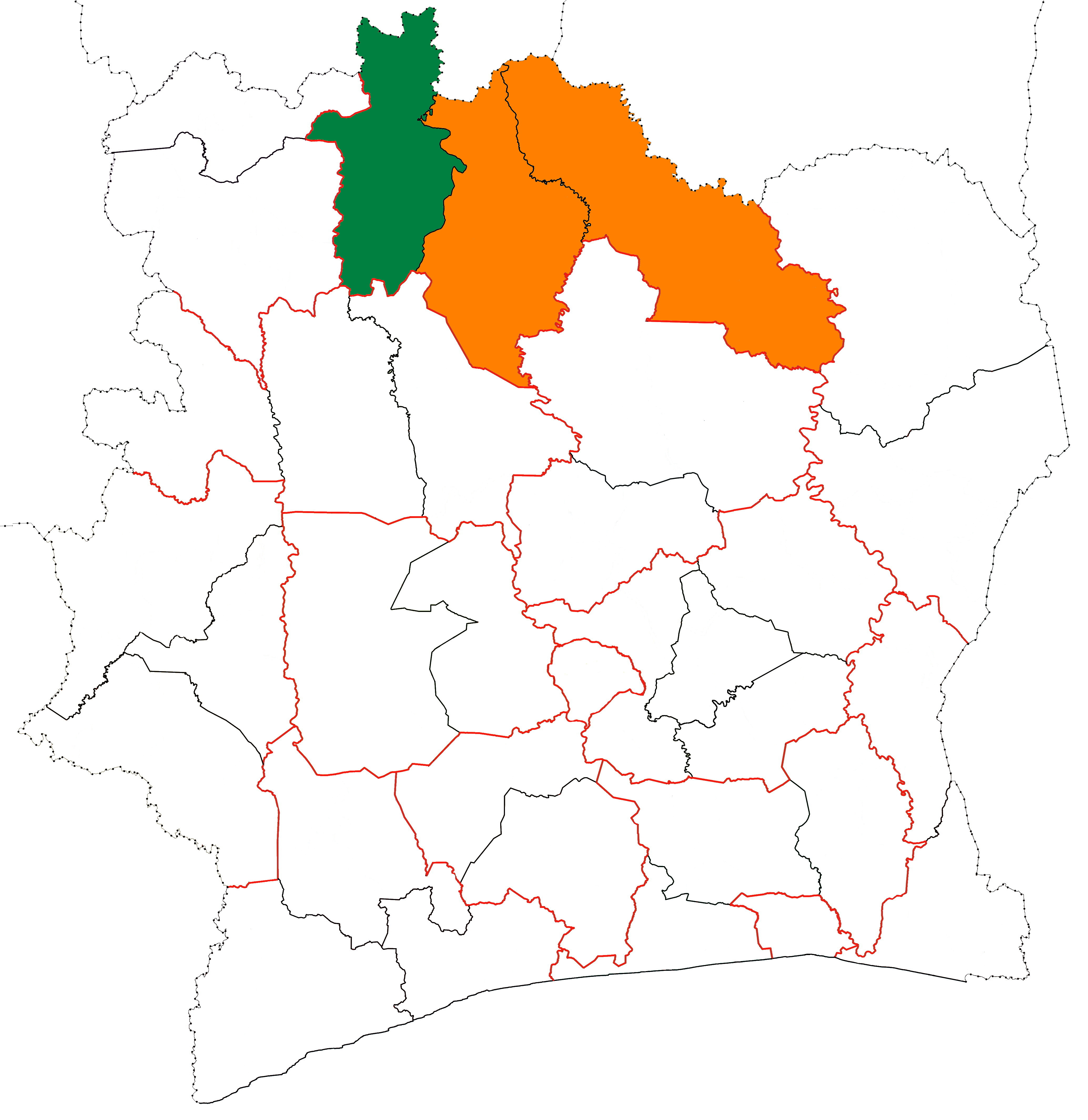
- Location of Bagoué Region (green) in Ivory Coast and in Savanes District
- Country: Ivory Coast
- District: Savanes
- Established: 2011
- Regional seat: Boundiali

Government
  - Prefect: Issa Coulibaly
  - Council President: Siama Bamba

Area
  - Total: 10,200 km^{2} (3,900 sq mi)

Population (2021 census)
  - Total: 515,890
  - Density: 50.6/km^{2} (131/sq mi)
- Time zone: UTC+0 (GMT)

Bagoué Region is one of the 31 regions of Ivory Coast. Since its establishment in 2011, it has been one of three regions in Savanes District. The seat of the region is Boundiali and the region's population in the 2021 census was 515,890.

Bagoué is divided into three departments: Boundiali, Kouto, and Tengréla.
