= Koutiala Region =

Koutiala
- Region
- Coordinates: 12.389482°N 5.463920°W
- Country: Mali
- Capital: Koutiala

Area
  - Total: 14,600 km^{2} (5,600 sq mi)

Population (2023)
  - Total: 1,153,961
  - Density: 79.0/km^{2} (205/sq mi)

Koutiala Region is an administrative region in southern Mali. It was created from the division of the former Sikasso Region and has its capital in the city of Koutiala. The region belongs to the agriculturally important south of the country and is considered one of Mali’s most important cotton-growing areas.

== Etymology ==
The name of the Koutiala Region comes from its capital of the same name. Koutiala city was initially founded between the 16th and 17th centuries as a small village. Following the settlement of woodworking Koulé from Ouolosso, the village gained the appellation Koulé Diakan, which literally translates to "the village of the sons of Koulé" in the local Minianka language. Gradually, this term would become corrupted to Koutiala, the current name of the city and region.

== Geography ==
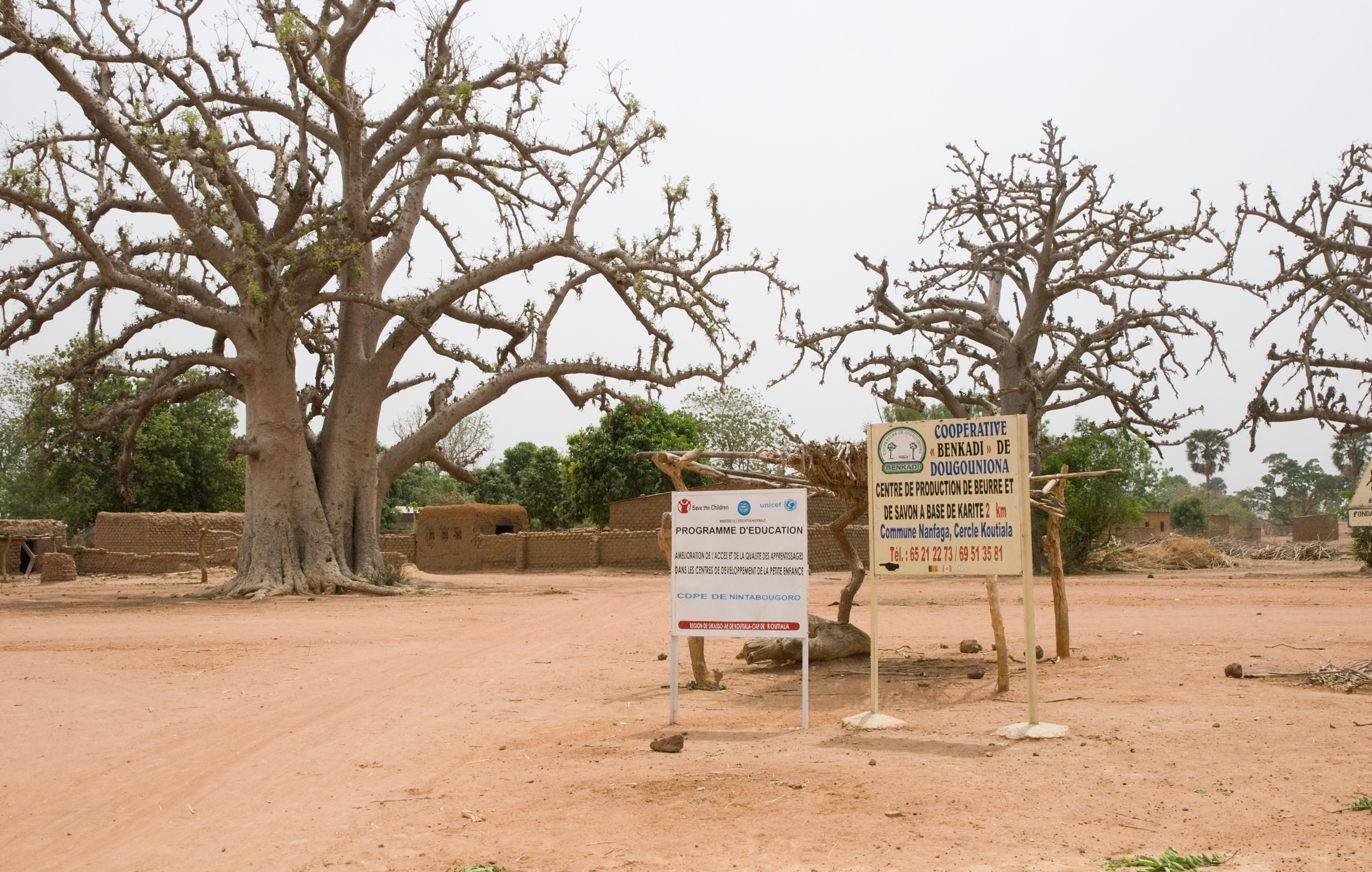
Baobab trees in Nintabougoro village

Koutiala Region is located in the south-eastern interior of Mali and borders Burkina Faso to the east and south-east. It covers an area of 14,600 km², corresponding to about 1.17% of the national territory. The region shares internal borders with four other Malian regions; Ségou and San to the north; Sikasso to the south; and Dioïla to the west. The landscape is dominated by savannas, farmland, smaller watercourses and seasonal bodies of water. The region lies within the drainage basin of the Niger River. The area around Koutiala is wetter and more intensively used for agriculture than many of Mali’s more northerly regions.

== History ==
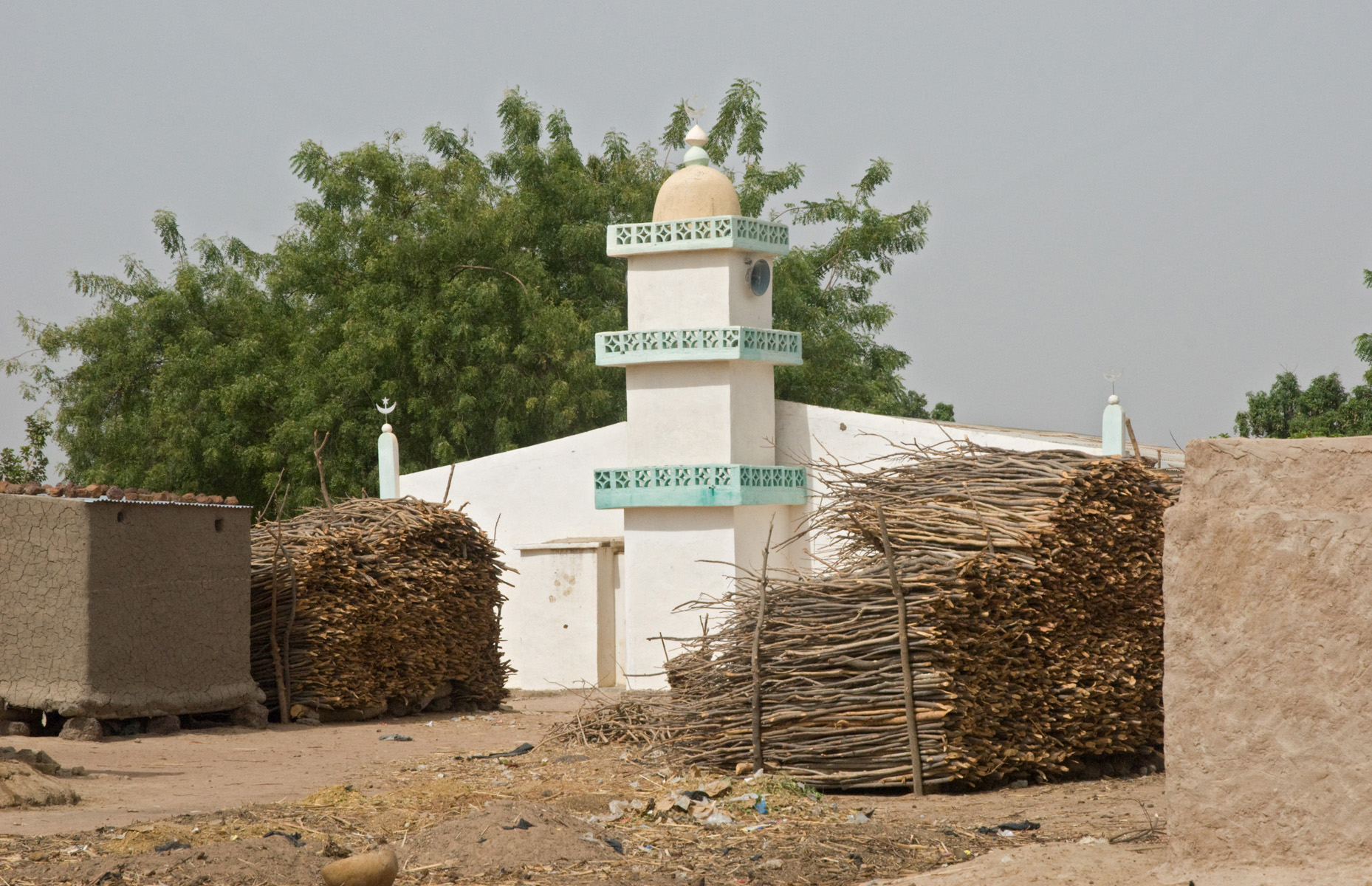
Mosque in N'tiesso village

The area of present-day Koutiala Region long belonged to Sikasso Region after Mali’s independence. The creation of a separate Koutiala Region had already been envisaged by the administrative reform of 2012. Law No. 2023-006 of 13 March 2023 on the creation of administrative districts in the Republic of Mali confirmed the new territorial division and established Koutiala as a separate region. The new region was formed mainly from the former cercles of Koutiala and Yorosso.

== Administrative divisions ==
The region is divided into eight cercles. According to OCHA, it comprises 22 arrondissements, 46 communes and 386 villages.

Cercle code	Cercle	Communes
1601	Koutiala	12
1602	Yorosso	7
1603	M'Péssoba	8
1604	Molobala	5
1605	Koury	2
1606	Konséguéla	3
1607	Kouniana	6
1608	Zangasso	3

== Demographics ==
In 2023, the Koutiala Region had a population of 1,153,961. It is the sixth most populated region in Mali, with around 1,169,882 inhabitants as of 2022. The settlement pattern is predominantly rural, with only 18.6% of the population urbanized. Koutiala, as the largest town, serves as the region’s administrative, market, transport and industrial centre.

Ethnicity in Koutiala (2022)
1. Senufo (58.7%)
2. Bambara (20.9%)
3. Fula (6.00%)
4. Bobo / Bwa (4.71%)
5. Malinké (2.64%)
6. Dogon (2.04%)
7. Soninke (1.33%)
8. Other (3.67%)

Koutiala has the highest total fertility rate in Mali at 7.4 births per woman. In comparison, the Malian national average TFR stands at 6.1 births per woman.

Year	Population
1998	538,606
2009	812,112
2023	1,153,961

=== Ethnicity ===
Koutiala is ethnically and linguistically diverse. The Senufo, primarily belonging to the Minianka subgroup, accounted for 58.69% of the regional population in 2022. Koutiala is one of only two Malian regions, the other being Sikasso, where the Senufo constitute the largest ethnic group. Significant minority populations in the region include the Bambara, Fula, Bobo/Bwa, Malinké, Soninke, and Dogon.

Mother tongues in Koutiala region (2022 census)
1. Minianka (51.31%)
2. Bambara (31.70%)
3. Bobo (4.46%)
4. Fula (3.74%)
5. Malinke (3.43%)
6. Dogon (1.64%)
7. Senufo (0.90%)
8. Other Malian (2.67%)
9. Other African (0.03%)
10. Other foreign (0.12%)

=== Religion ===
The 2022 census found that 91.57% of the population in Koutiala was Muslim, 4.32% was Christian, 3.14% identified with traditional faiths, 0.62% had no religion, and 0.35% practiced other religions. Although Islam is the dominant religion among all the ethnic groups in the region (except the Bobo/Bwa), a significant minority of Minianka and Senufo identify with traditional faiths.

== Economy ==
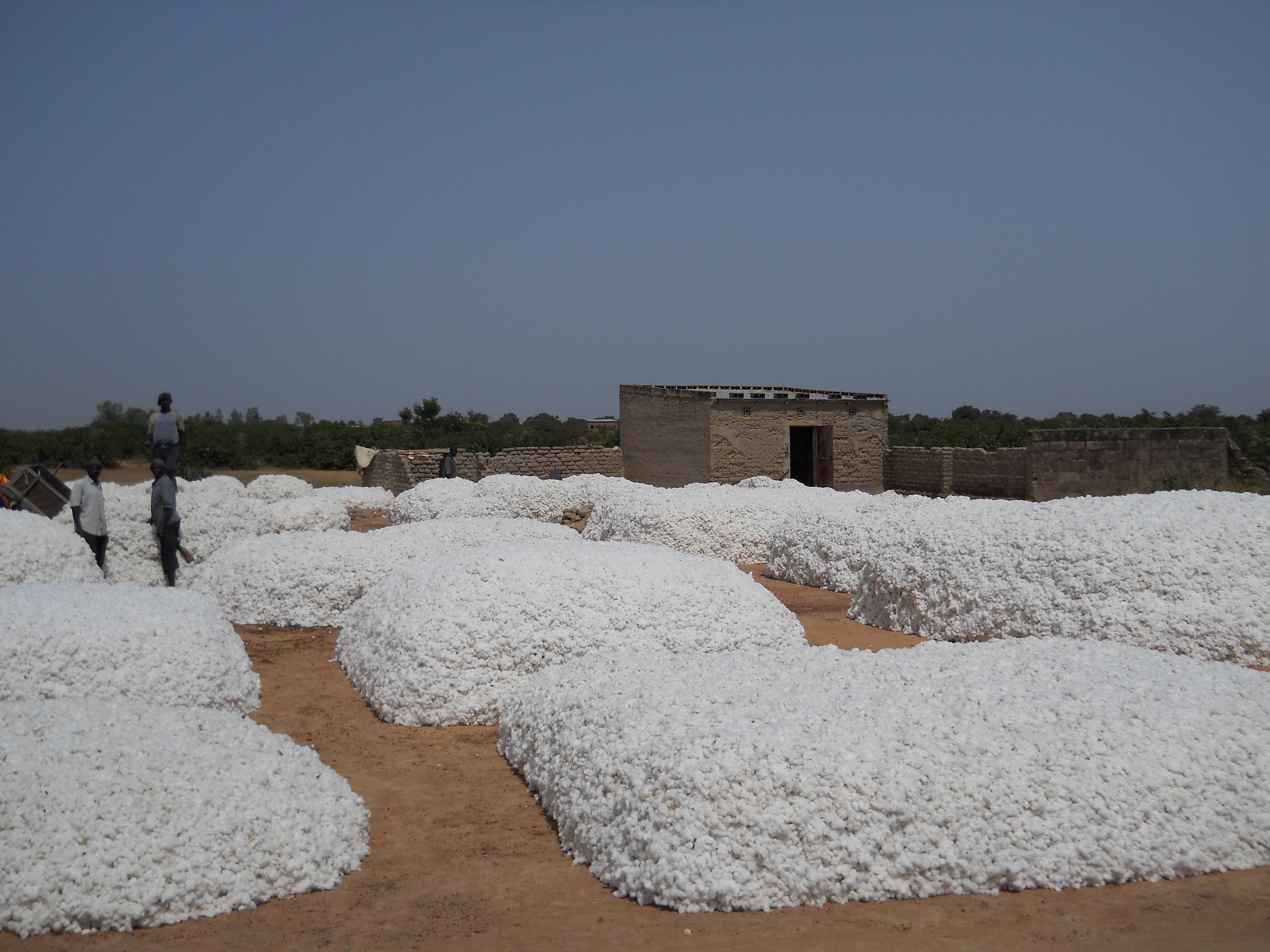
Cotton piles near Koutiala town

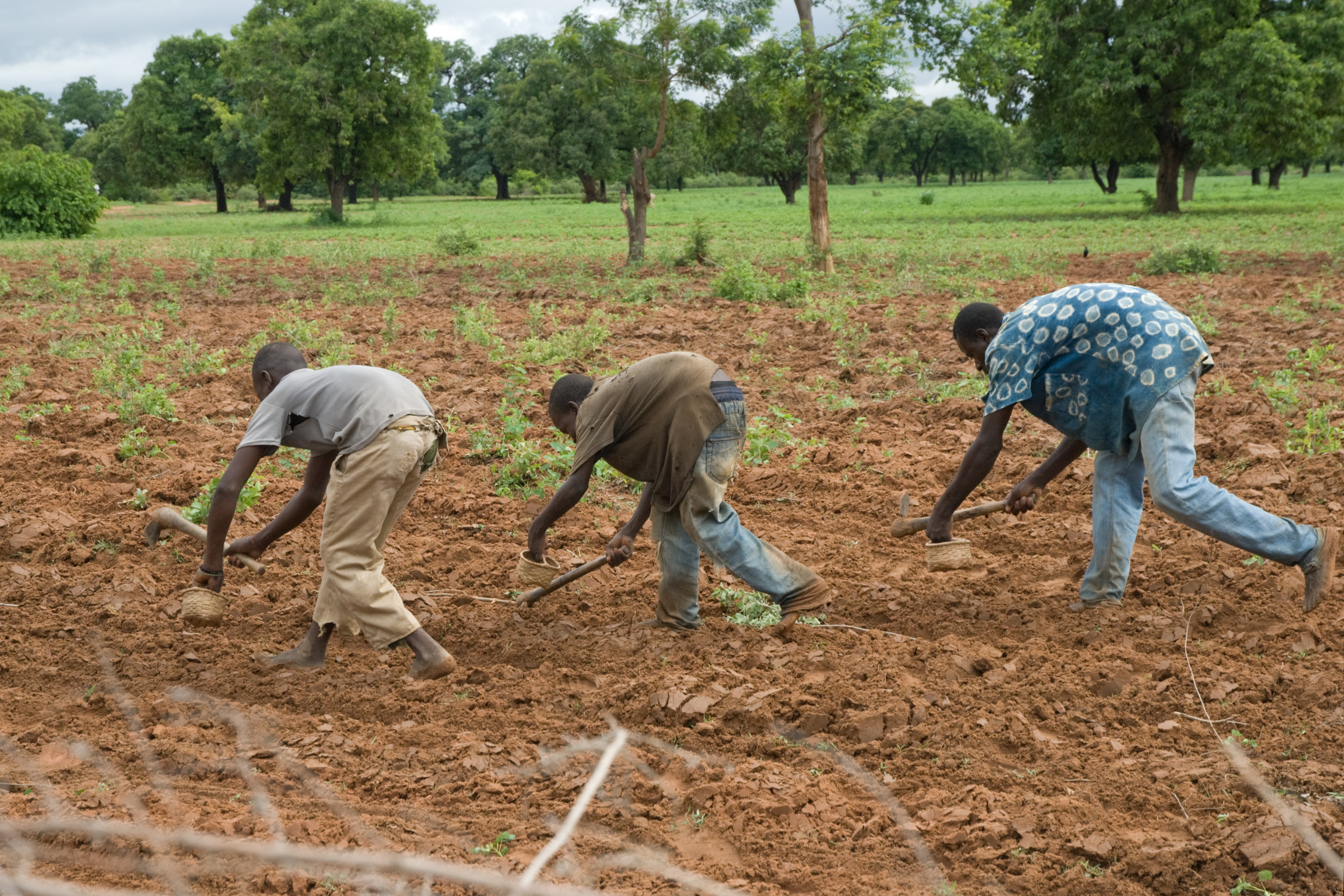
Farmers sowing sorghum in Nafanga

The economy of Koutiala Region is strongly agricultural. Koutiala is regarded as the country’s “heartland of cotton production”. In addition to cotton, the main crops include sorghum, millet, maize, peanuts and other field crops.

The city of Koutiala is an important agro-industrial centre. It is home to cotton ginning and agricultural-processing enterprises. Regional trade benefits from its location on important transport routes between Sikasso, Ségou, Mopti and Burkina Faso. In addition to agriculture and processing, livestock farming, transport services, crafts and markets for grain, livestock and cotton products play an important role.
