= Baba Berthé =

Minister of Agriculture
- In office December 15, 2012 – 2020
- Preceded by: Yaranga Coulibaly
- Succeeded by: Moulaye Ahmed Boubacar

Personal details
- Born: 1961 (age 64–65) Sougoumba, Sikasso Region, Mali
- Education: Toulouse Institute of Political Studies

Baba Berthé is a Malian politician who served as the Minister of Agriculture under Django Sissoko between December 2012 and May 5, 2019.

== Biography ==
Berthe was born in Sougoumba, near Koutiala, Sikasso Region, Mali around 1961. He went to high school in Sikasso then attended the National School of Administration in Bamako. Berthe joined the Malian civil service in 1987 and completed his national youth service, finishing with a position in the finance sector of the Malian Air Force.

In 1989, he was appointed as secretary general of the Tombouctou Region and served as the district chief in Gargando and Raz El Ma between 1989 and 1991, before becoming the district chief in Gossi between January and August 1991. Between 1992 and 1998, Berthe attended the Toulouse Institute for Political Studies, obtaining a degree in fundamental public law, and then a PhD in public law in 1998.

Berthe has lectured at the University of Bamako since 1998. Between 2000 and 2004, he was a visiting professor at the Toulouse Institute where he gave courses on the democratization of Africa from 1990 to 2000 and the issues of rural economies and security in West Africa. On May 16, 2011, Berthe was appointed as the secretary-general to the president of Mali, and then as Minister of Agriculture under Django Sissoko.

In his time as agriculture minister, Berthe helped secure a $250 million agreement with the Islamic Development Bank to rebuild Mali in the wake of the Mali War. Berthe was the first agriculture minister not to be a part of the mass unionization among cotton farmers in Mali in 1991 since it occurred. Berthe was sacked from his position on May 5, 2019.

In 2020, after he left the post of agriculture minister, Berthe helped secure a deal with Geocoton to finance a textile mill in Mali.
