= Sirakélé =

- Village
- Location in Mali
- Coordinates: 12°30′50″N 5°28′40″W
- Country: Mali
- Region: Sikasso Region
- Cercle: Koutiala Cercle
- Commune: Songoua
- Elevation: 335 m (1,099 ft)
- Time zone: UTC+0 (GMT)

Sirakélé is a village and seat of the commune of Songoua in the Cercle of Koutiala in the Sikasso Region of southern Mali. The village is 15 km north of Koutiala.

The town has both an elementary and middle school. The mayor's name is Yaya Traore.

In partnership with the women's and men's agricultural cooperatives in Sirakele, the World Vegetable Center (AVRDC) and ICRISAT lead trainings and do surveys on nutrition and seed (primarily millet and sorghum) research. To complete these projects, they often partner with the Koutiala office of Malian Association for Food Security and Sovereignty (AMASSA), a branch of the French NGO Afrique Verte.

== History ==
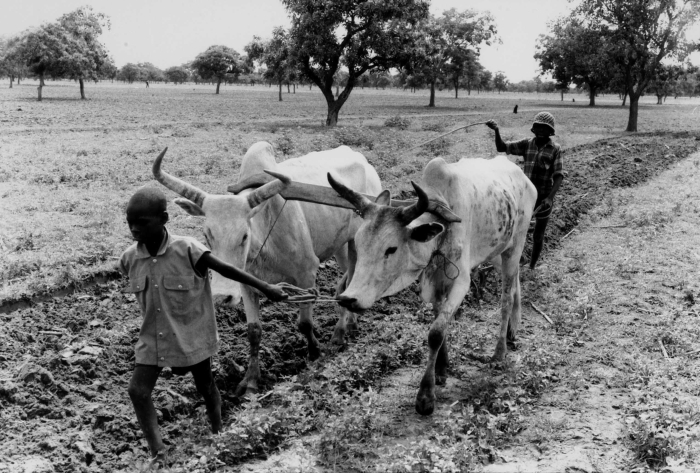
A farmer in Sirakélé, 1985

The French explorer René Caillié stopped at Sirakélé on 17 February 1828 on his journey to Timbuktu. He was travelling with a caravan transporting kola nuts to Djenné. In his book Travels through Central Africa to Timbuctoo published in 1830, he refers to the village as Saraclé. Caillié wrote:

At eleven o'clock we stopped at Saraclé, a little walled village, having a very well supplied market. At the entrance of the village I observed a well: the soil in which it was dug, consisted of greyish earth, mixed with sand and gravel. The well was from fifteen to eighteen feet in depth, and the water it contained clear and pleasant to the taste. It had no enclosure, and near to it was a great hole, into which the negresses throw the water in which they wash their clothes. Although this water was very dirty, both men and women washed their faces in it every morning; and many persons belonging to our company followed their example.

== Geography ==
Sirakélé is located at 12°30'50" N, 5°28'40"W.

== Sources ==
- Caillié, René (1830). Travels through Central Africa to Timbuctoo; and across the Great Desert, to Morocco, performed in the years 1824-1828 (Volume 1). London: Colburn & Bentley.
- Viguier, Pierre (2008). Sur les Traces de René Caillié: Le Mali de 1828 Revisité. Versailles, France: Quae. ISBN 978-2-7592-0271-3..
