= Ziena =

- Village
- Location in Mali
- Coordinates: 12°12′15″N 5°41′30″W
- Country: Mali
- Region: Sikasso Region
- Cercle: Koutiala Cercle
- Commune: Fagui
- Time zone: UTC+0 (GMT)

Ziena (or Ziéna) is a village and seat (chef-lieu) of the commune of Fagui in the Cercle of Koutiala in the Sikasso Region of southern Mali. The village is 45 km southwest of Koutiala.
