= Zansoni =

- Village
- Location in Mali
- Coordinates: 12°36′33″N 5°34′3″W
- Country: Mali
- Region: Sikasso Region
- Cercle: Koutiala Cercle
- Commune: Fakolo
- Time zone: UTC+0 (GMT)

Zansoni is a village and seat (chef-lieu) of the commune of Fakolo in the Cercle of Koutiala in the Sikasso Region of southern Mali. The village is 35 km northwest of Koutiala.
