= Bongosso =

- Village
- Location in Mali
- Coordinates: 12°40′18″N 5°11′35″W
- Country: Mali
- Region: Sikasso Region
- Cercle: Koutiala Cercle
- Commune: Koromo
- Elevation: 306 m (1,004 ft)
- Time zone: UTC+0 (GMT)

Bongosso (or Bougounso) is a village and seat (chef-lieu) of the commune of Koromo in the Cercle of Koutiala in the Sikasso Region of southern Mali. The village is 45 km (28 mi) northeast of Koutiala.

French explorer René Caillié stopped at Bongosso in February 1828 on his journey to Timbuktu. He was travelling with a caravan transporting kola nuts to Djenné. He described the village in his book Travels through Central Africa to Timbuctoo published in 1830. He wrote:

About eleven in the morning we arrived at Bancousso [Bongosso], a large village containing a population of five or six hundred, and situated in a well cultivated plain, shaded by baobabs. This village has a large market, well supplied with the productions of the country; I saw in it a great quantity of cloth and earthen pots which are made here.

== Sources ==
- Caillié, René (1830). Travels through Central Africa to Timbuctoo; and across the Great Desert, to Morocco, performed in the years 1824-1828 (Volume 1). London: Colburn & Bentley.
- Viguier, Pierre (2008). Sur les Traces de René Caillié: Le Mali de 1828 Revisité. Versailles, France: Quae. ISBN 978-2-7592-0271-3..
