= Jhajia =

- Village
- Interactive map of Jhajia
- Coordinates: 20.398309°N 85.314921°E
- Country: India
- State: Orissa
- District: Cuttack

Languages
  - Official: Oriya
- Time zone: UTC+5:30 (IST)
- Vehicle registration: OR-
- Coastline: 0 kilometres (0 mi)
- Nearest city: Cuttack

Jhajia is a village in Odisha, India, with a population of about 20,000. The village is about 97 kilometres (60 mi) from the state capital Bhubaneswar. The village lies about 1 kilometre (0.62 mi) away from the banks of the Mahanadi River on its southern side and 6 kilometres (3.7 mi) from a forest reserve on its northern side. The Mahanadi river lies to the south. The areas pin code is 754031.

== Education ==
The village has a UP School and a High School. The Jhajia High School is in the village. A rarity in this area. After school most of the students who are interested in pursuing further education leave for bigger towns like Cuttack, Banki, Athgarh and Bhubaneswar. Some also attend nearby colleges located at Baramba and Sankhameri.

== History ==
In February 2025 the rail tracks between Jhajha and Dadpur on the railway were sabotaged.
