= Songuela =

Songuela Songuéla
- Village
- Location in Mali
- Coordinates: 12°44′04″N 05°38′19″W
- Country: Mali
- Region: Sikasso Region
- Cercle: Koutiala Cercle
- Commune: Debela
- Time zone: UTC+0 (GMT)

Songuela is a village in the rural commune of Debela, in the Cercle of Koutiala, in the Sikasso Region of southern Mali.

== History ==
In 1889, the Faama Tieba Traoré (r. 1866–1893) besieged Songuela, and the villages of M'Pessoba, Quintieri, Faracala, Zangorola and Zandiela sent troops to rescue it. After conquering Songuela, Tieba headed to Fonfona.

In 1891, Songuela was among the villages that sent men to help protect Tieré, which was in revolt against Tieba. Later, the chief of Songuela declared submission but opposed the entry of troops into the village. Tieba asked him to hand over soldiers to participate in the attack against Sugumba, but he refused. Tieba and his brother Babemba prepared to attack Songuela, but chose not to invade the village for fear of reprisals from the population. With rifles and bows they fired on the village for 24 hours, forcing the inhabitants to flee at night.

In 1898, after suppressing the revolt in Tieré, Queletigui and Cafeleamadu marched towards Gorosso, from where they continued their journey towards Sanssoni, Tionsso, Songuela, Fonfona and Duguolo.

== Photo Gallery ==
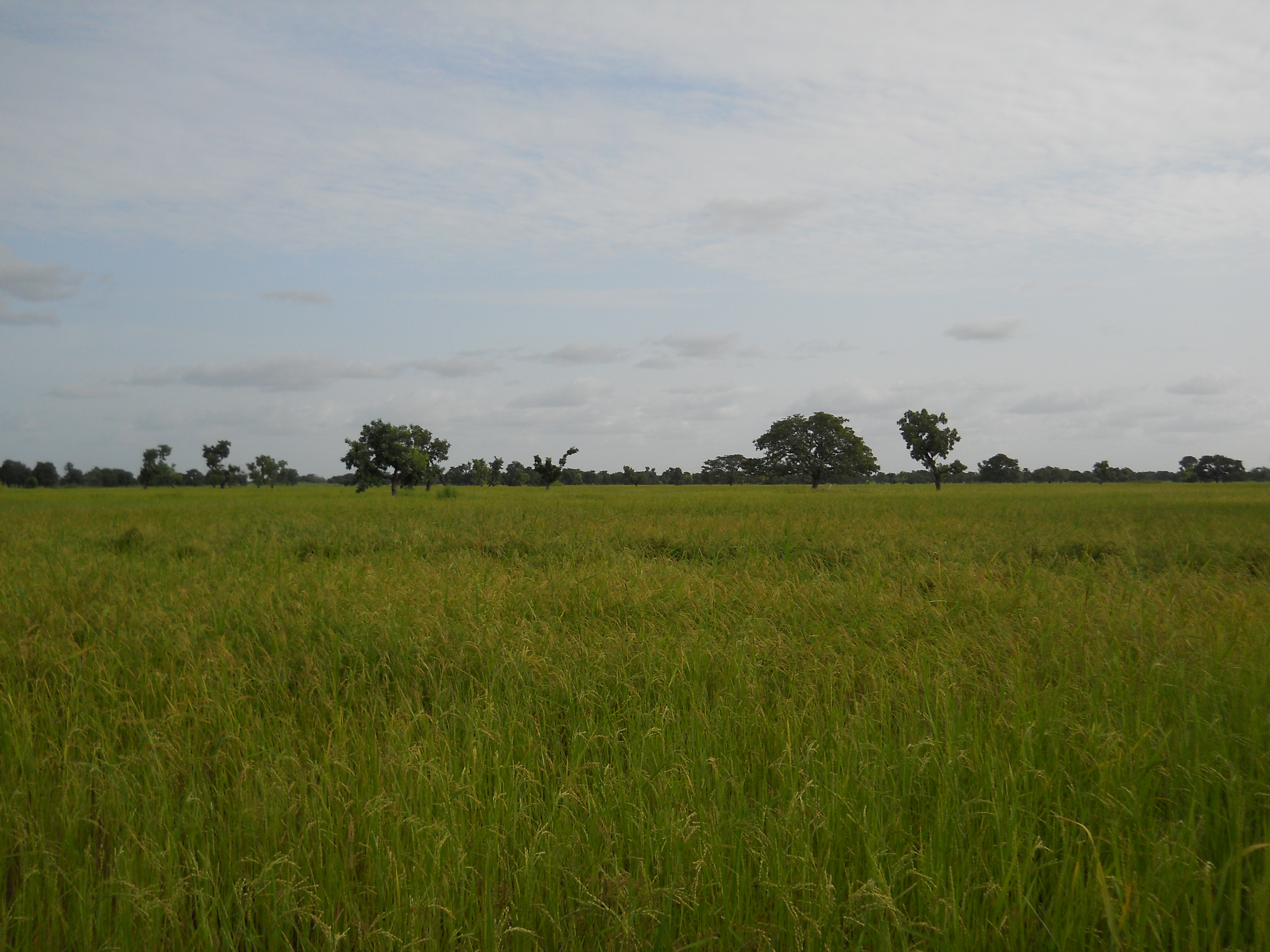
Rice fields in Songuela, Mali

== Bibliography ==
- Colheaux, Par A. (1924). "Contribution a L'Étude de L'Histoire de L'Ancien Royaum de Kénédougou (1825-1898)" [Contribution to the Study of the History of the Ancient Kingdom of Kénédougou (1825-1898)]. Bulletin of the Committee of Historical and Scientific Studies of French West Africa. 1–4. Comitê de Estudos históricos e científicos da África Ocidental Francesa.
- "Communes de la region de Sikasso" [Communes of the Sikasso Region] (PDF). Mali Statistics Center. 2009a.
