= Tiere =

- Village
- Location in Mali
- Coordinates: 11°54′0″N 5°24′21″W
- Country: Mali
- Region: Sikasso Region
- Cercle: Koutiala Cercle
- Commune: Diouradougou Kafo
- Time zone: UTC+0 (GMT)

Tiere (or Tièrè) is a village and seat of the commune of Diouradougou Kafo in the Cercle of Koutiala in the Sikasso Region of southern Mali. The village lies 80 km south of Koutiala.
