= Fonfona =

- Village
- Location in Mali
- Coordinates: 12°40′15″N 5°36′33″W
- Country: Mali
- Region: Sikasso Region
- Cercle: Koutiala Cercle
- Commune: Tao
- Elevation: 289 m (948 ft)
- Time zone: UTC+0 (GMT)

Fonfona is a village and the administrative centre (chef-lieu) of the commune of Tao in the Cercle of Koutiala in the Sikasso Region of southern Mali. The village is 45 km northwest of Koutiala.
