= Oula =

- Village
- Location in Mali
- Coordinates: 12°35′30″N 5°20′30″W
- Country: Mali
- Region: Sikasso Region
- Cercle: Koutiala Cercle
- Commune: Songo-Doubacoré
- Elevation: 324 m (1,063 ft)
- Time zone: UTC+0 (GMT)

Oula is a village and the administrative centre (chef-lieu) of the commune of Songo-Doubacoré in the Cercle of Koutiala in the Sikasso Region of southern Mali. The village is 26 km northeast of Koutiala.
