= Koloni =

- Village
- Location in Mali
- Coordinates: 12°46′5″N 5°19′40″W
- Country: Mali
- Region: Sikasso Region
- Cercle: Koutiala Cercle
- Commune: Niantaga
- Elevation: 312 m (1,024 ft)
- Time zone: UTC+0 (GMT)

Koloni is a village and administrative centre (chef-lieu) of the commune of Niantaga in the Cercle of Koutiala in the Sikasso Region of southern Mali. The village is 45 km north-northeast of Koutiala.

The French explorer René Caillié stopped at Koloni on 21 February 1828 on his journey to Timbuktu. He was travelling with a caravan transporting kola nuts to Djenné. In his book Travels through Central Africa to Timbuctoo published in 1830 he wrote:

At ten in the morning we arrived at Coloni, a little village situated in a beautiful, fertile and well cultivated plain, surrounded by a great number of large bombases. ... The village of Coloni, which is surrounded by two mud walls, contains a population of about four hundred, consisting of Foulahs, Bambaras, and Mandingoes: it is shaded by large mimosas and some bombaces.

== Sources ==
- Caillié, René (1830). Travels through Central Africa to Timbuctoo; and across the Great Desert, to Morocco, performed in the years 1824-1828 (Volume 1). London: Colburn & Bentley.
- Viguier, Pierre (2008). Sur les Traces de René Caillié: Le Mali de 1828 Revisité. Versailles, France: Quae. ISBN 978-2-7592-0271-3..
