= N'Togonasso =

- Small town
- Location in Mali
- Coordinates: 12°32′30″N 5°9′52″W
- Country: Mali
- Region: Sikasso Region
- Cercle: Koutiala Cercle
- Commune: Gouadji Kao
- Time zone: UTC+0 (GMT)

N'Togonasso is a small town and seat of the commune of Gouadji Kao in the Cercle of Koutiala in the Sikasso Region of southern Mali. The town is 42 km northeast of Koutiala.
