= Kouwo =

- Village
- Location in Mali
- Coordinates: 12°22′38″N 6°3′21″W
- Country: Mali
- Region: Sikasso Region
- Cercle: Koutiala Cercle
- Commune: Diédougou
- Time zone: UTC+0 (GMT)

Kouwo (also Kouô ) is a village and seat (chef-lieu) of the commune of Diédougou in the Cercle of Koutiala in the Sikasso Region of southern Mali. The village lies 67 km west of the town of Koutiala.
