= Sanguela =

- Village
- Location in Mali
- Coordinates: 12°0′10″N 5°17′10″W
- Country: Mali
- Region: Sikasso Region
- Cercle: Koutiala Cercle
- Commune: Goudie Sougouna
- Time zone: UTC+0 (GMT)

Sanguela is a village and seat (chef-lieu) of the commune of Goudie Sougouna in the Cercle of Koutiala in the Sikasso Region of southern Mali. The village is 57 km southeast of Koutiala.
