= Koloni, Koutiala =

Koloni
- Town
- Location in Mali
- Coordinates: 12°2′28″N 7°29′11″W
- Country: Mali
- Region: Sikasso Region
- Cercle: Koutiala Cercle
- Commune: Niantaga
- Time zone: UTC+0 (GMT)

Koloni is a small town and seat of the commune of Niantaga in the Cercle of Koutiala in the Sikasso Region of southern Mali.
