= Peguena =

- Village
- Location in Mali
- Coordinates: 12°40′25″N 5°54′55″W
- Country: Mali
- Region: Sikasso Region
- Cercle: Koutiala Cercle
- Commune: Kafo Faboli
- Time zone: UTC+0 (GMT)

Peguena is a village and seat (chef-lieu) of the commune of Kafo Faboli in the Cercle of Koutiala in the Sikasso Region of southern Mali.
