= Miena =

Miena may refer to:

- Miena, Tasmania
- Miena, Mali
