= Karangasso =

- Village
- Location in Mali
- Coordinates: 12°16′54″N 5°15′28″W
- Country: Mali
- Region: Sikasso Region
- Cercle: Koutiala Cercle
- Commune: Nafanga
- Time zone: UTC+0 (GMT)

Karangasso is a village and seat (chef-lieu) of the commune of Nafanga in the Cercle of Koutiala in the Sikasso Region of southern Mali.
