= Kapala (disambiguation) =

A kapala is a cup made from a human skull used as a ritual implement.

Kapala may also refer to:

- Kapala (wasp), a genus of parasitic wasps in the family Eucharitidae
- Kapala, Koutiala, a village in the Cercle of Koutiala of the Sikasso Region in Mali
- Kapala, Sikasso, a village in the Cercle of Sikasso of the Sikasso Region in Mali
- Frederick J. Kapala (born 1950), United States federal judge

== See also ==
- Kappal, 2014 Indian film
