= Bobola Zangasso =

- Village
- Location in Mali
- Coordinates: 12°32′15″N 4°59′33″W
- Country: Mali
- Region: Sikasso Region
- Cercle: Koutiala Cercle
- Commune: Zanfigué
- Elevation: 310 m (1,020 ft)
- Time zone: UTC+0 (GMT)

Bobola Zangasso is a village and the administrative centre (chef-lieu) of the commune of Zanfigué in the Cercle of Koutiala in the Sikasso Region of southern Mali.
