= Sinkolo =

- Commune and village
- Location in Mali
- Coordinates: 12°5′15″N 5°33′0″W
- Country: Mali
- Region: Sikasso Region
- Cercle: Koutiala Cercle

Area
  - Total: 296 km^{2} (114 sq mi)
- Elevation: 290 m (950 ft)

Population (2009)
  - Total: 11,470
- Time zone: UTC+0 (GMT)

Sinkolo is a village and rural commune in the Cercle of Koutiala in the Sikasso Region of southern Mali. The commune covers an area of 296 square kilometers and includes 9 villages. In the 2009 census it had a population of 11,470. The village of Sinkolo, the administrative centre (chef-lieu) of the commune, is 35 km south-southwest of Koutiala.
