= M'Pessoba =

- Commune and town
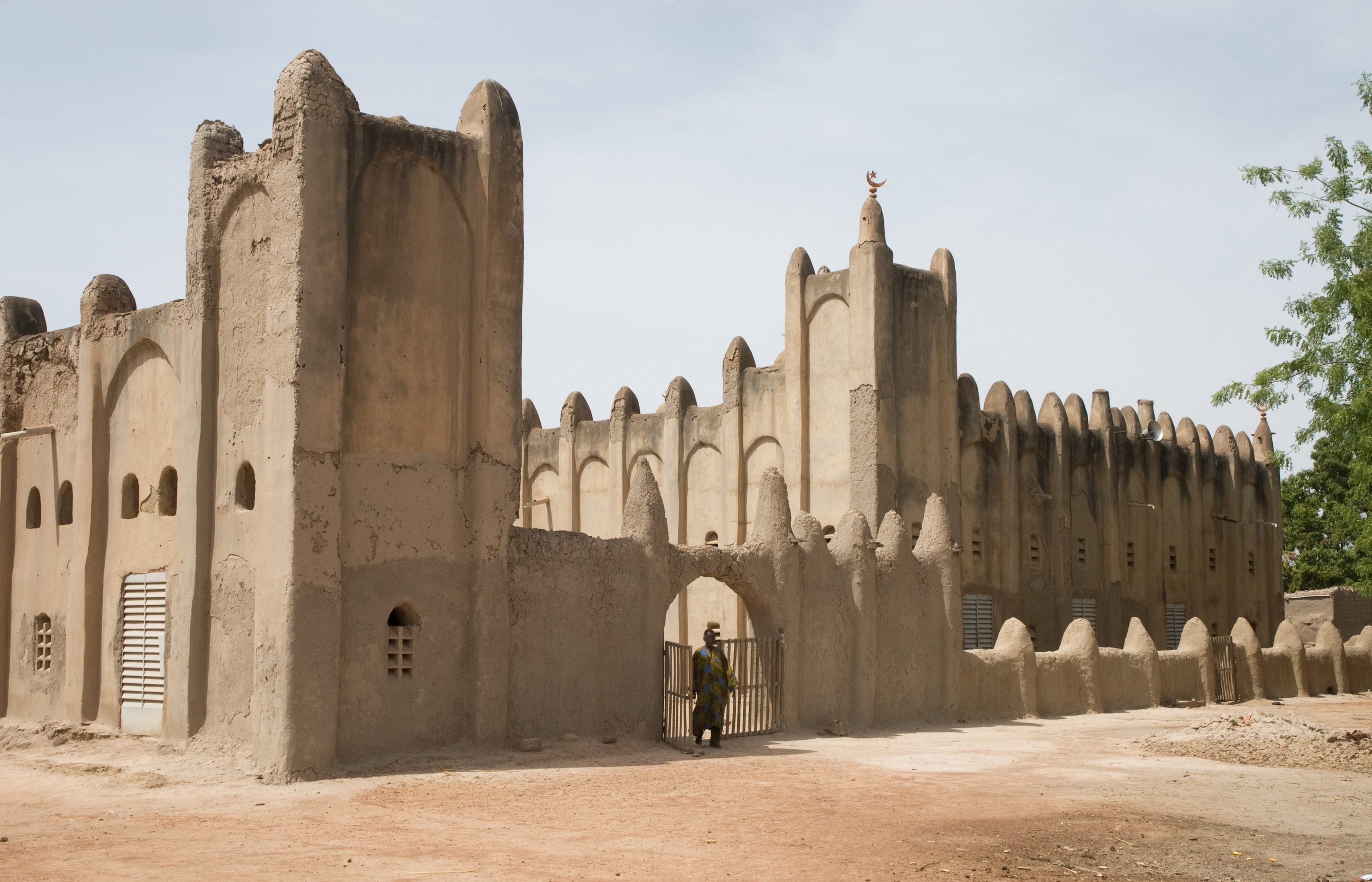
- The old mosque in the town of M'Pessoba (May 2014).

- Location in Mali
- Coordinates: 12°39′50″N 5°43′0″W
- Country: Mali
- Region: Sikasso Region
- Cercle: Koutiala Cercle

Area
  - Total: 490 km^{2} (190 sq mi)

Population (2009)
  - Total: 36,297
  - Density: 74/km^{2} (190/sq mi)
- Time zone: UTC+0 (GMT)

M'Pessoba is a small town and commune in the Cercle of Koutiala in the Sikasso Region of southern Mali. The commune covers an area of 490 square kilometers and includes 19 settlements. In the 2009 census it had a population of 36,297. The town of M'Pessoba, the administrative centre (chef-lieu) of the commune, is 40 km northwest of Koutiala. M'Pessoba is the nearest town with services such as banking and pharmacy for a number of villages along fr:Route nationale 6 (Mali) including Songuela, pt:Quintieri, pt:Faracala, pt:Zangorola and pt:Zandiela.
