= Sougoumba =

- Small town
- Location in Mali
- Coordinates: 12°10′20″N 5°11′20″W
- Country: Mali
- Region: Sikasso Region
- Cercle: Koutiala Cercle
- Commune: Koningué
- Time zone: UTC+0 (GMT)

Sougoumba is a small town and seat (chef-lieu) of the commune of Koningué in the Cercle of Koutiala in the Sikasso Region of southern Mali. The town is about 40 km southeast of Koutiala.
