= Yognogo =

- Commune
- Location in Mali
- Coordinates: 12°27′31″N 5°18′53″W
- Country: Mali
- Region: Sikasso Region
- Cercle: Koutiala Cercle

Area
  - Total: 66 km^{2} (25 sq mi)

Population (2009)
  - Total: 5,700
  - Density: 86/km^{2} (220/sq mi)
- Time zone: UTC+0 (GMT)

Yognogo is a commune in the Cercle of Koutiala in the Sikasso Region of southern Mali. The commune covers an area of 66 square kilometers and includes 3 villages (Bereniakan, Famessasso, and Koumbri). In the 2009 census it had a population of 5,700. The village of Famessasso, the administrative centre (chef-lieu) of the commune, is 20 km northeast of Koutiala near the Route Nationale 13 that links Koutiala with San.
