= Konséquéla =

- Commune and town
- Location in Mali
- Coordinates: 12°24′12″N 5°53′5″W
- Country: Mali
- Region: Sikasso Region
- Cercle: Koutiala Cercle

Area
  - Total: 656 km^{2} (253 sq mi)

Population (2009)
  - Total: 31,007
  - Density: 47.3/km^{2} (122/sq mi)
- Time zone: UTC+0 (GMT)

Konséquéla is a town and rural commune in the Cercle of Koutiala in the Sikasso Region of southern Mali. The commune covers an area of 656 square kilometers and includes 16 settlements. In the 2009 census it had a population of 31,007. The town of Konséquéla, the administrative centre (chef-lieu) of the commune, is 45 km west of Koutiala.
