= Karagouana Mallé =

- Commune and village
- Location in Mali
- Coordinates: 12°34′5″N 5°45′44″W
- Country: Mali
- Region: Sikasso Region
- Cercle: Koutiala Cercle

Area
  - Total: 182 km^{2} (70 sq mi)

Population (2009 census)
  - Total: 7,520
- Time zone: UTC+0 (GMT)

Karagouana Mallé is a rural commune and village in the Cercle of Koutiala in the Sikasso Region of southern Mali. The commune covers an area of 182 square kilometers and includes 5 villages. In the 2009 census it had a population of 7,520. The village of Karagouana Mallé, the administrative centre (chef-lieu) of the commune, is 38 km northwest of Koutiala.
