= Nampé =

- Commune
- Location in Mali
- Coordinates: 12°35′5″N 5°27′10″W
- Country: Mali
- Region: Sikasso Region
- Cercle: Koutiala Cercle

Area
  - Total: 142 km^{2} (55 sq mi)

Population (2009)
  - Total: 7,009
  - Density: 49.4/km^{2} (128/sq mi)
- Time zone: UTC+0 (GMT)

Nampé is a commune in the Cercle of Koutiala in the Sikasso Region of southern Mali. The commune covers an area of 142 square kilometers and includes 4 villages. In the 2009 census it had a population of 7,009. The village of Baramba, the administrative centre (chef-lieu) of the commune, is 25 km north of Koutiala.
