= Fakolo =

- Commune
- Location in Mali
- Coordinates: 12°36′33″N 5°34′3″W
- Country: Mali
- Region: Sikasso Region
- Cercle: Koutiala Cercle

Area
  - Total: 201 km^{2} (78 sq mi)

Population (2009)
  - Total: 13,130
  - Density: 65.3/km^{2} (169/sq mi)
- Time zone: UTC+0 (GMT)

Fakolo is a commune in the Cercle of Koutiala in the Sikasso Region of southern Mali. The commune covers an area of 201 square kilometers and includes 6 villages. In the 2009 census it had a population of 13,130. The village of Zansoni, the administrative centre (chef-lieu) of the commune, is 35 km northwest of Koutiala.
