= Goudie Sougouna =

- Commune
- Location in Mali
- Coordinates: 12°0′10″N 5°17′10″W
- Country: Mali
- Region: Sikasso Region
- Cercle: Koutiala Cercle

Area
  - Total: 267 km^{2} (103 sq mi)

Population (2009)
  - Total: 8,303
  - Density: 31.1/km^{2} (80.5/sq mi)
- Time zone: UTC+0 (GMT)

Goudie Sougouna is a commune in the Cercle of Koutiala in the Sikasso Region of southern Mali. The commune covers an area of 267 square kilometers and includes 6 villages. In the 2009 census it had a population of 8,303. The village of Sanguela, the administrative centre (chef-lieu) of the commune, is 57 km southeast of Koutiala.
