= Zanina =

- Commune
- Location in Mali
- Coordinates: 12°43′54″N 5°40′8″W
- Country: Mali
- Region: Sikasso Region
- Cercle: Koutiala Cercle

Area
  - Total: 125 km^{2} (48 sq mi)

Population (2009)
  - Total: 7,492
  - Density: 59.9/km^{2} (155/sq mi)
- Time zone: UTC+0 (GMT)

Zanina is a commune in the Cercle of Koutiala in the Sikasso Region of southern Mali. The commune covers an area of 125 square kilometers and includes 3 villages. In the 2009 census it had a population of 7,492. The village of Débéla, the administrative centre (chef-lieu) of the commune, is 45 km northwest of Koutiala.
