= Kolonigué =

- Commune
- Location in Mali
- Coordinates: 12°10′37″N 5°19′58″W
- Country: Mali
- Region: Sikasso Region
- Cercle: Koutiala Cercle
- Admin HQ (Chef-lieu): Molobala

Area
  - Total: 456 km^{2} (176 sq mi)

Population (2009 census)
  - Total: 32,447
  - Density: 71.2/km^{2} (184/sq mi)
- Time zone: UTC+0 (GMT)

Kolonigué is a rural commune in the Cercle of Koutiala in the Sikasso Region of southern Mali. The commune covers an area of 456 square kilometers and includes 10 settlements. In the 2009 census it had a population of 32,447. The small town of Molobala, the administrative centre (chef-lieu) of the commune, is 38 km southeast of Koutiala.

The commune of Kolonigué includes 12 settlements:

- Farakoro
- Faraoula
- Hermakono
- M'Peresso
- Molobala (the main village)
- N'Tosso
- Sogo
- Sokourani
- Sougoulasso
- Sousoula
- Tarasso 1
- Tarasso 2
