= Baramba =

- Village
- Location in Mali
- Coordinates: 12°35′5″N 5°27′10″W
- Country: Mali
- Region: Sikasso Region
- Cercle: Koutiala Cercle
- Commune: Nampé
- Elevation: 312 m (1,024 ft)
- Time zone: UTC+0 (GMT)

Baramba is a village and administrative centre (chef-lieu) of the commune of Nampé in the Cercle of Koutiala in the Sikasso Region of southern Mali. (Note: Written as Barhamba on the 1:200,000 Koutiala map issued by the French Institut Geographique National (IGN) in 1970.) The village is 25 km north of Koutiala.

The French explorer René Caillié stopped at Baramba on 18 February 1828 on his journey to Timbuktu. He was travelling with a caravan transporting kola nuts to Djenné. In his book Travels through Central Africa to Timbuctoo published in 1830, he refers to the village as Bamba. Caillié wrote:

After proceeding four miles we halted at the village of Bamba, which is shaded by boababs. At the market I observed that women wore glass rings in the nose; and some had these ornaments made of gold or copper. This village contains three to four hundred inhabitants.

The route of Caillié's caravan passed a few kilometers to the west of what is now the town of Koutiala. The town did not exist at the time: it was founded at the end of the 19th century by the French army after the conquest.

== Sources ==
- Caillié, René (1830). Travels through Central Africa to Timbuctoo; and across the Great Desert, to Morocco, performed in the years 1824-1828 (Volume 1). London: Colburn & Bentley.
- Viguier, Pierre (2008). Sur les Traces de René Caillié: Le Mali de 1828 Revisité. Versailles, France: Quae. ISBN 978-2-7592-0271-3..
