= Koromo =

Koromo may refer to:

- Koromo, a variety of koi
- Koromo, Mali
- Koromo, a former name of Toyota, Aichi
- Japanese word for clothing
- Koromo Amae, the name of a character from the Japanese manga/anime Saki.
