= Sorobasso =

- Commune and village
- Location in Mali
- Coordinates: 12°31′15″N 5°15′16″W
- Country: Mali
- Region: Sikasso Region
- Cercle: Koutiala Cercle

Area
  - Total: 133 km^{2} (51 sq mi)
- Elevation: 299 m (981 ft)

Population (2009)
  - Total: 4,884
  - Density: 36.7/km^{2} (95.1/sq mi)
- Time zone: UTC+0 (GMT)

Sorobasso is a village and commune in the Cercle of Koutiala in the Sikasso Region of southern Mali. The commune covers an area of 133 square kilometers and includes 5 villages. In the 2009 census it had a population of 4,884. The village of Sorobasso, the administrative centre (chef-lieu) of the commune, is 30 km northeast of Koutiala on the Route Nationale 13 that links Koutiala with San.
