= Diouradougou Kafo =

- Commune
- Location in Mali
- Coordinates: 11°54′0″N 5°24′21″W
- Country: Mali
- Region: Sikasso Region
- Cercle: Koutiala Cercle

Area
  - Total: 402 km^{2} (155 sq mi)

Population (2009)
  - Total: 6,876
  - Density: 17.1/km^{2} (44.3/sq mi)
- Time zone: UTC+0 (GMT)

Diouradougou Kafo is a commune in the Cercle of Koutiala in the Sikasso Region of southern Mali. The commune covers an area of 402 square kilometers and includes 10 villages. In the 2009 census it had a population of 6,876. The village of Tièrè, the administrative centre (chef-lieu) of the commune, is 80 km south of Koutiala.
