= Kafo Faboli =

- Commune
- Location in Mali
- Coordinates: 12°40′25″N 5°54′55″W
- Country: Mali
- Region: Sikasso Region
- Cercle: Koutiala Cercle

Area
  - Total: 217 km^{2} (84 sq mi)

Population (2009)
  - Total: 8,130
  - Density: 37.5/km^{2} (97.0/sq mi)
- Time zone: UTC+0 (GMT)

Kafo Faboli is a commune in the Cercle of Koutiala in the Sikasso Region of southern Mali. The commune covers an area of 217 square kilometers and includes 10 villages. In the 2009 census it had a population of 8,130. The village of Peguena, the administrative centre (chef-lieu) of the commune, is 60 km northwest of Koutiala.
