= Konina, Mali =

Konina
- Commune and town
- Location in Mali
- Coordinates: 12°28′45″N 6°10′40″W
- Country: Mali
- Region: Sikasso Region
- Cercle: Koutiala Cercle

Area
  - Total: 733 km^{2} (283 sq mi)

Population (2009)
  - Total: 14,786
  - Density: 20.2/km^{2} (52.2/sq mi)
- Time zone: UTC+0 (GMT)

Konina is a small town and commune in the Cercle of Koutiala in the Sikasso Region of southern Mali. The commune covers an area of 733 square kilometers and includes 7 villages. In the 2009 census it had a population of 14,786. The village of Konina, the administrative centre (chef-lieu) of the commune, is 78 km east of Koutiala.
