= Tao, Mali =

Tao
- Commune
- Location in Mali
- Coordinates: 12°40′15″N 5°36′33″W
- Country: Mali
- Region: Sikasso Region
- Cercle: Koutiala Cercle

Area
  - Total: 67 km^{2} (26 sq mi)

Population (2009)
  - Total: 7,047
  - Density: 110/km^{2} (270/sq mi)
- Time zone: UTC+0 (GMT)

Tao is a commune in the Cercle of Koutiala in the Sikasso Region of southern Mali. The commune covers an area of 67 square kilometers and includes 3 villages. In the 2009 census it had a population of 7,047. The village of Fonfona, the administrative centre (chef-lieu) of the commune, is 45 km northwest of Koutiala.
