= Zanfigué =

- Commune
- Location in Mali
- Coordinates: 12°32′15″N 4°59′33″W
- Country: Mali
- Region: Sikasso Region
- Cercle: Koutiala Cercle

Area
  - Total: 226 km^{2} (87 sq mi)

Population (2009)
  - Total: 14,841
  - Density: 65.7/km^{2} (170/sq mi)
- Time zone: UTC+0 (GMT)

Zanfigué is a commune in the Cercle of Koutiala in the Sikasso Region of southern Mali. The commune covers an area of 226 square kilometers and includes 11 villages. In the 2009 census it had a population of 14,841. The village of Bobola Zangasso, the administrative centre (chef-lieu) of the commune, is 55 km east-northeast of Koutiala.
