= N'Tossoni =

- Commune and village
- Location in Mali
- Coordinates: 12°31′52″N 5°46′17″W
- Country: Mali
- Region: Sikasso Region
- Cercle: Koutiala Cercle

Area
  - Total: 155 km^{2} (60 sq mi)

Population (2009)
  - Total: 8,793
  - Density: 56.7/km^{2} (147/sq mi)
- Time zone: UTC+0 (GMT)

N'Tossoni is a village and rural commune in the Cercle of Koutiala in the Sikasso Region of southern Mali. The commune covers an area of 155 square kilometers and includes 5 villages. In the 2009 census it had a population of 8,793. The village of N'Tossoni, the administrative centre (chef-lieu) of the commune, is about 40 km northwest of Koutiala.
