= Gouadji Kao =

- Commune
- Location in Mali
- Coordinates: 12°32′30″N 5°9′52″W
- Country: Mali
- Region: Sikasso Region
- Cercle: Koutiala Cercle

Area
  - Total: 150 km^{2} (58 sq mi)

Population (2009)
  - Total: 10,579
  - Density: 71/km^{2} (180/sq mi)
- Time zone: UTC+0 (GMT)

Gouadji Kao is a commune in the Cercle of Koutiala in the Sikasso Region of southern Mali. The commune covers an area of 150 square kilometers and includes 5 villages. In the 2009 census it had a population of 10,579. The village of N'Togonasso, the administrative centre (chef-lieu) of the commune, is 42 km northeast of Koutiala.
