= Songoua =

- Commune
- Location in Mali
- Coordinates: 12°30′50″N 5°28′40″W
- Country: Mali
- Region: Sikasso Region
- Cercle: Koutiala Cercle

Area
  - Total: 107 km^{2} (41 sq mi)

Population (2009)
  - Total: 6,918
  - Density: 64.7/km^{2} (167/sq mi)
- Time zone: UTC+0 (GMT)

Songoua is a commune in the Cercle of Koutiala in the Sikasso Region of southern Mali. The commune covers an area of 107 square kilometers and includes the villages of Sirakélé and Kilé. In the 2009 census it had a population of 6,918. The village of Sirakélé, the administrative centre (chef-lieu) of the commune, is 15 km north of Koutiala.
