= Songo-Doubacoré =

- Commune
- Location in Mali
- Coordinates: 12°35′30″N 5°20′30″W
- Country: Mali
- Region: Sikasso Region
- Cercle: Koutiala Cercle

Area
  - Total: 232 km^{2} (90 sq mi)

Population (2009)
  - Total: 14,007
  - Density: 60.4/km^{2} (156/sq mi)
- Time zone: UTC+0 (GMT)

Songo-Doubacoré is a commune in the Cercle of Koutiala in the Sikasso Region of southern Mali. The commune covers an area of 232 square kilometers and includes 11 villages. In the 2009 census it had a population of 14,007. The village of Oula, the administrative centre (chef-lieu) of the commune, is 26 km northeast of Koutiala.
