= Koningué =

- Commune
- Location in Mali
- Coordinates: 12°10′20″N 5°11′20″W
- Country: Mali
- Region: Sikasso Region
- Cercle: Koutiala Cercle

Area
  - Total: 255 km^{2} (98 sq mi)

Population (2009)
  - Total: 15,943
  - Density: 62.5/km^{2} (162/sq mi)
- Time zone: UTC+0 (GMT)

Koningué is a commune in the Cercle of Koutiala in the Sikasso Region of southern Mali. The commune covers an area of 255 square kilometers and includes 4 settlements. In the 2009 census it had a population of 15,943. The small town of Sougoumba, the administrative centre (chef-lieu) of the commune, is about 40 km southeast of Koutiala.
