= Leleni =

- Village
- Location in Mali
- Coordinates: 12°23′22″N 5°14′43″W
- Country: Mali
- Region: Sikasso Region
- Cercle: Koutiala Cercle
- Commune: Logouana
- Time zone: UTC+0 (GMT)

Leleni is a village and seat (chef-lieu) of the commune of Logouana in the Cercle of Koutiala in the Sikasso Region of southern Mali.
