= Fagui =

- Commune
- Location in Mali
- Coordinates: 12°12′15″N 5°41′30″W
- Country: Mali
- Region: Sikasso Region
- Cercle: Koutiala Cercle

Area
  - Total: 504 km^{2} (195 sq mi)

Population (2009)
  - Total: 11,800
- Time zone: UTC+0 (GMT)

Fagui is a commune in the Cercle of Koutiala in the Sikasso Region of southern Mali. The commune covers an area of 504 square kilometers and includes 9 villages. In the 2009 census it had a population of 11,800. The village of Ziéna, the administrative centre (chef-lieu) of the commune, is 45 km southwest of Koutiala.
