= N'Goutjina =

- Commune and village
- Location in Mali
- Coordinates: 12°17′49″N 5°28′50″W
- Country: Mali
- Region: Sikasso Region
- Cercle: Koutiala Cercle

Area
  - Total: 236 km^{2} (91 sq mi)

Population (2009)
  - Total: 7,274
  - Density: 30.8/km^{2} (79.8/sq mi)
- Time zone: UTC+0 (GMT)

N'Goutjina is a village and rural commune in the Cercle of Koutiala in the Sikasso Region of southern Mali. The commune covers an area of 236 square kilometers and includes 8 villages. In the 2009 census it had a population of 18,667. The village of N'Goutjina, the administrative centre (chef-lieu) of the commune, is 10 km south of Koutiala.
