= Zébala =

- Commune and town
- Location in Mali
- Coordinates: 12°18′36″N 5°9′25″W
- Country: Mali
- Region: Sikasso Region
- Cercle: Koutiala Cercle

Area
  - Total: 312 km^{2} (120 sq mi)
- Elevation: 371 m (1,217 ft)

Population (2009)
  - Total: 17,278
  - Density: 55.4/km^{2} (143/sq mi)
- Time zone: UTC+0 (GMT)

Zébala is a small town and rural commune in the Cercle of Koutiala in the Sikasso Region of southern Mali. The commune covers an area of 312 square kilometers and includes 8 settlements. In the 2009 census it had a population of 17,278. The town of Zébala, the administrative centre (chef-lieu) of the commune, is 35 km east-southeast of Koutiala.
