= Sincina =

- Commune and village
- Location in Mali
- Coordinates: 12°21′6″N 5°26′30″W
- Country: Mali
- Region: Sikasso Region
- Cercle: Koutiala Cercle

Area
  - Total: 210 km^{2} (81 sq mi)
- Elevation: 370 m (1,210 ft)

Population (2009)
  - Total: 17,025
  - Density: 81/km^{2} (210/sq mi)
- Time zone: UTC+0 (GMT)

Sincina is a small town and commune in the Cercle of Koutiala in the Sikasso Region of southern Mali. The commune covers an area of 210 square kilometers and includes 7 settlements. In the 2009 census it had a population of 17,025. The town of Sincina, the administrative centre (chef-lieu) of the commune, is only 5 km southeast of the center of Koutiala. As Koutiala expands the commune will become a suburb of the town.
