= Famessasso =

- Village
- Location in Mali
- Coordinates: 12°27′31″N 5°18′53″W
- Country: Mali
- Region: Sikasso Region
- Cercle: Koutiala Cercle
- Commune: Yognogo
- Elevation: 314 m (1,030 ft)
- Time zone: UTC+0 (GMT)

Famessasso is a village and the administrative centre (chef-lieu) of the commune of Yognogo in the Cercle of Koutiala in the Sikasso Region of southern Mali.
