= Logouana =

- Commune
- Location in Mali
- Coordinates: 12°23′22″N 5°14′43″W
- Country: Mali
- Region: Sikasso Region
- Cercle: Koutiala Cercle

Area
  - Total: 118 km^{2} (46 sq mi)

Population (2009)
  - Total: 9,105
  - Density: 77.2/km^{2} (200/sq mi)
- Time zone: UTC+0 (GMT)

Logouana is a rural commune in the Cercle of Koutiala in the Sikasso Region of southern Mali. The principal town lies at Leleni. The commune covers an area of 118 square kilometers and includes 5 settlements. In the 2009 census it had a population of 9,105. The village of Leleni, the administrative centre (chef-lieu) of the commune, is 25 km east of Koutiala.
