= Diédougou, Sikasso =

Diédougou
- Commune
- Location in Mali
- Coordinates: 12°22′38″N 6°3′21″W
- Country: Mali
- Region: Sikasso Region
- Cercle: Koutiala Cercle

Area
  - Total: 147 km^{2} (57 sq mi)

Population (2009)
  - Total: 4,449
  - Density: 30.3/km^{2} (78.4/sq mi)
- Time zone: UTC+0 (GMT)

Diédougou is a commune in the Cercle of Koutiala in the Sikasso Region of southern Mali. The commune includes 4 villages and covers an area of 147 square kilometers. In the 2009 census it had a population of 4,449. The administrative centre (chef-lieu) is the village of Kouwo which lies 67 km west of Koutiala.
