= Débéla =

- Village
- Location in Mali
- Coordinates: 12°43′54″N 5°40′8″W
- Country: Mali
- Region: Sikasso Region
- Cercle: Koutiala Cercle
- Commune: Zanina
- Time zone: UTC+0 (GMT)

Débéla is a village and the administrative centre (chef-lieu) of the commune of Zanina in the Cercle of Koutiala in the Sikasso Region of southern Mali.
