= Kapala, Koutiala =

Kapala
- Commune and village
- Location in Mali
- Coordinates: 12°12′45″N 5°27′33″W
- Country: Mali
- Region: Sikasso Region
- Cercle: Koutiala Cercle

Area
  - Total: 199 km^{2} (77 sq mi)

Population (2009)
  - Total: 4,064
  - Density: 20.4/km^{2} (52.9/sq mi)
- Time zone: UTC+0 (GMT)

Kapala is a village and commune in the Cercle of Koutiala in the Sikasso Region of southern Mali. The commune covers an area of 199 square kilometers and includes 4 villages. In the 2009 census the commune had a population of 4,064. The village of Kapala, the administrative centre (chef-lieu) of the commune, is about 20 km south of Koutiala.
