= Debela =

Debela is a surname. Notable people with the surname include:

- Dejene Debela (born 1995), Ethiopian long-distance runner
- Tetiana Debela (born 1970), Ukrainian hurdler

== See also ==
- Débéla, village in Mali
