= Molobala =

Town in Sicasso, Mali

- Town
- Location within Mali
- Coordinates: 12°10′37″N 05°19′45″W
- Country: Mali
- Region: Sikasso
- Cercle: Koutiala
- Commune: Kolonigué
- Elevation: 345 m (1,132 ft)
- Time zone: UTC+0 (GMT)

Molobala, or Molabala, is a town and the seat of the Kolonigué Commune in Sikasso Region, Mali. It has an average elevation of 345 metres above the sea level.

== Climate ==
Molobala has Semi-arid Climate (BSh) under the Köppen Climate Classification. It sees the most precipitation in August, with an average rainfall of 252 mm; and the least precipitation in February, with virtually no rainfall.

Climate data for Molobala
Month	Jan	Feb	Mar	Apr	May	Jun	Jul	Aug	Sep	Oct	Nov	Dec	Year
Mean daily maximum °C (°F)	33.0 (91.4)	35.8 (96.4)	38.4 (101.1)	38.8 (101.8)	37.3 (99.1)	34.4 (93.9)	30.3 (86.5)	28.8 (83.8)	29.9 (85.8)	32.4 (90.3)	34.3 (93.7)	33.2 (91.8)	33.9 (93.0)
Daily mean °C (°F)	25.1 (77.2)	27.8 (82.0)	30.9 (87.6)	32.2 (90.0)	31.2 (88.2)	29.0 (84.2)	26.1 (79.0)	25.0 (77.0)	25.6 (78.1)	27.2 (81.0)	27.2 (81.0)	25.4 (77.7)	27.7 (81.9)
Mean daily minimum °C (°F)	18.1 (64.6)	20.5 (68.9)	23.5 (74.3)	25.8 (78.4)	25.9 (78.6)	24.4 (75.9)	22.6 (72.7)	22.0 (71.6)	22.1 (71.8)	22.5 (72.5)	20.3 (68.5)	18.5 (65.3)	22.2 (71.9)
Average rainfall mm (inches)	1 (0.0)	0 (0)	3 (0.1)	22 (0.9)	49 (1.9)	83 (3.3)	182 (7.2)	252 (9.9)	158 (6.2)	55 (2.2)	2 (0.1)	0 (0)	807 (31.8)
Source: Climate-Data.org
