= Nafanga =

- Commune
- Location in Mali
- Coordinates: 12°16′54″N 5°15′28″W
- Country: Mali
- Region: Sikasso Region
- Cercle: Koutiala Cercle

Area
  - Total: 274 km^{2} (106 sq mi)

Population (2009)
  - Total: 9,273
  - Density: 33.8/km^{2} (87.7/sq mi)
- Time zone: UTC+0 (GMT)

Nafanga is a rural commune in the Cercle of Koutiala in the Sikasso Region of southern Mali. The commune covers an area of 274 square kilometers and includes 6 villages.

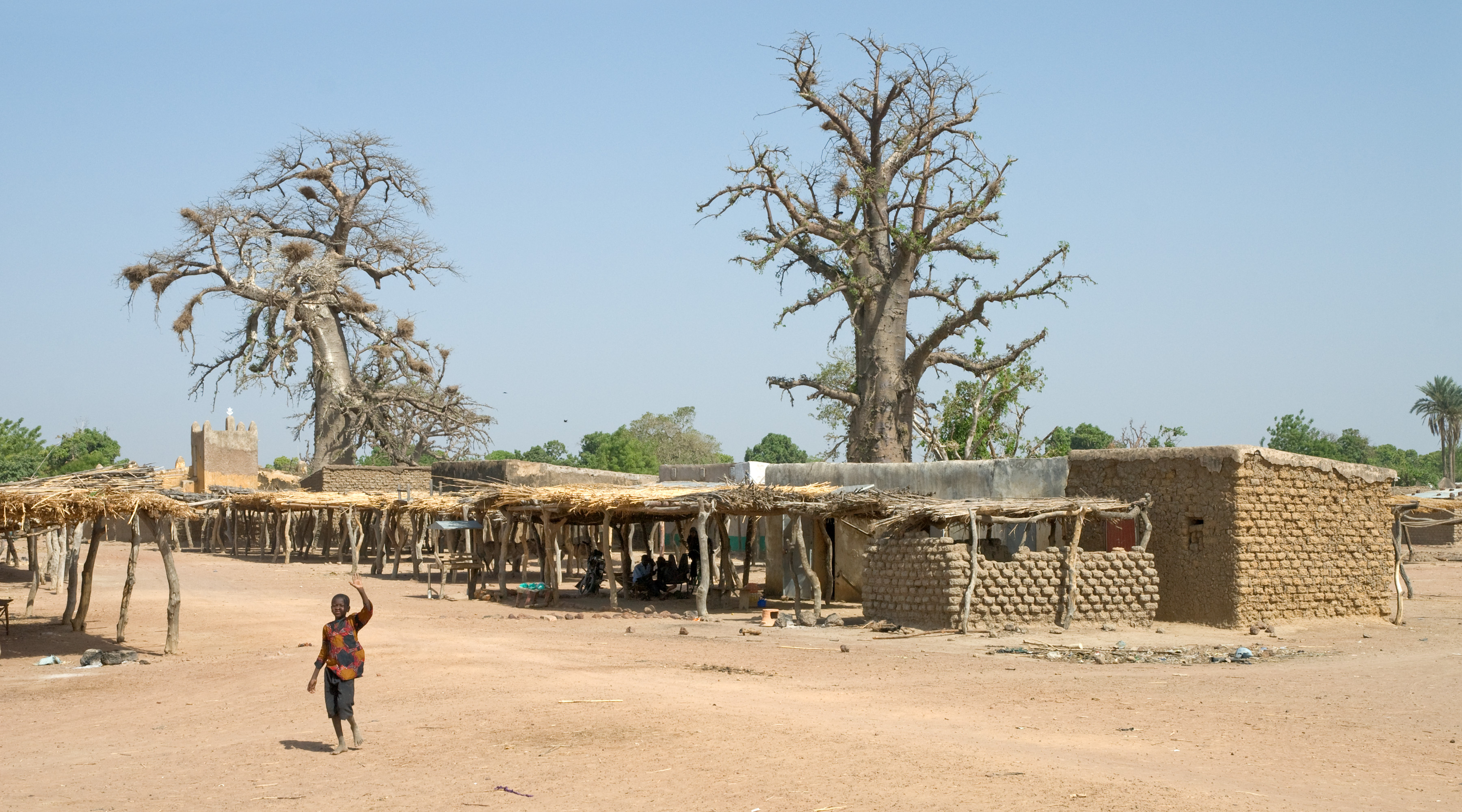
Village scene at Kani (Nafanga Commune), April 2014

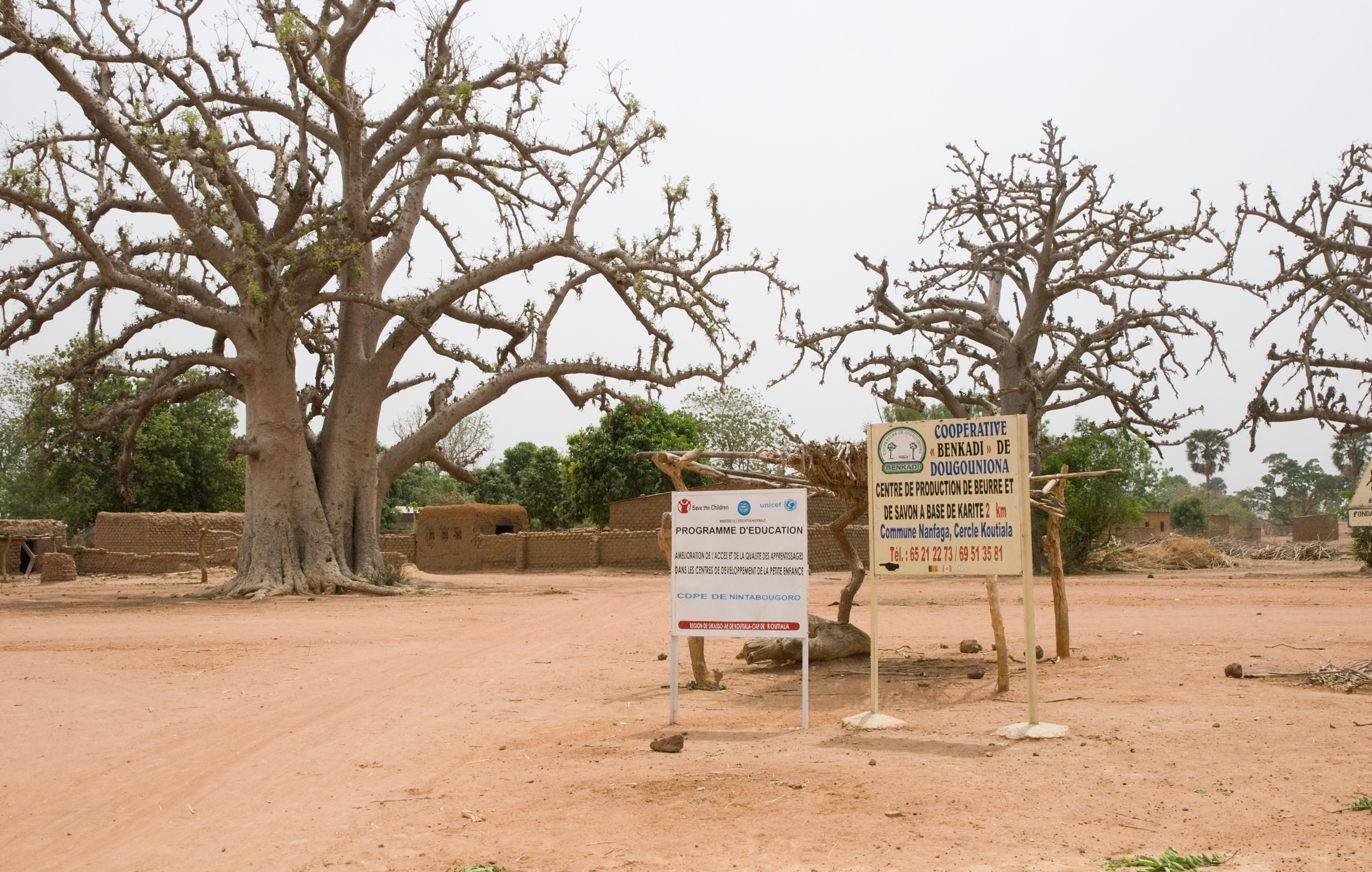
Village scene at Nintabougoro (Nafanga Commune), April 2015

- Dougouniona
- Kani
- Karangasso
- Nintabougoro
- Tianhirisso
- Zéguésso

In the 2009 census it had a population of 9,273. The village of Karangasso, the administrative centre (chef-lieu) of the commune, is 26 km southeast of Koutiala.
