= Miéna, Mali =

Miéna
- Commune and town
- Location in Mali
- Coordinates: 12°37′50″N 5°59′50″W
- Country: Mali
- Region: Sikasso Region
- Cercle: Koutiala Cercle

Area
  - Total: 190 km^{2} (73 sq mi)

Population (2009)
  - Total: 14,365
  - Density: 76/km^{2} (200/sq mi)
- Time zone: UTC+0 (GMT)

Miéna is a small town and commune in the Cercle of Koutiala in the Sikasso Region of southern Mali. The commune covers an area of 190 square kilometers and includes 4 settlements. In the 2009 census it had a population of 14,365. The town of Miéna, the administrative centre (chef-lieu) of the commune, is 63 km northwest of Koutiala.
