= Zangasso =

- Commune and town
- Location in Mali
- Coordinates: 12°9′25″N 5°37′10″W
- Country: Mali
- Region: Sikasso Region
- Cercle: Koutiala Cercle

Area
  - Total: 450 km^{2} (170 sq mi)
- Elevation: 318 m (1,043 ft)

Population (2009)
  - Total: 19,496
  - Density: 43/km^{2} (110/sq mi)
- Time zone: UTC+0 (GMT)

Zangasso (also Sangasso) is a small town and commune in the Cercle of Koutiala in the Sikasso Region of southern Mali. The commune covers an area of 452 square kilometers and includes 10 settlements. In the 2009 census it had a population of 19,925. The small town of Zangasso (or Sangasso), the administrative centre (chef-lieu) of the commune, is 30 km southwest of Koutiala on the Route Nationale 11 that links Koutiala with Sikasso.

The French explorer René Caillié stopped at Zangasso on 12 February 1828 on his journey to Timbuktu. He was travelling with a caravan transporting kola nuts to Djenné. In his book Travels through Central Africa to Timbuctoo published in 1830, he spelled the name of the village as Sanasso. He wrote:

As we advanced the soil became sandy and well cultivated. The country was generally open, yet there were some cés and nédés rhamnus lotus and nauclea. We met a numerous caravan from Jenné, laden with salt. This caravan was composed of about two hundred men, sixty women, and twenty five asses. About nine o'clock in the morning we halted at Sanasso. From Toumaré to Jenné, wood is so scarce that the greater part of the inhabitants burn millet stubble. Sanasso is shaded by bombaces and baobabs. Like all Bambara villages in this region, it is built of bricks baked in the sun. The houses have only a ground floor: they are very dirty, and surrounded with walls. (Note: Toumaré is the name used by Caillé for the modern village of Doumanaba.)

Caillié recorded details of many of the plants. The "cés" are shea trees Vitellaria paradoxa (formerly Butyrospermum parkii) from which shea butter is made. "Nédé" is Parkia biglobosa. Rhamnus lotus is a synonym for Ziziphus lotus, and his nauclea were probably Mitragyna inermis.

== Sources ==
- Caillié, René (1830). Travels through Central Africa to Timbuctoo; and across the Great Desert, to Morocco, performed in the years 1824-1828 (Volume 1). London: Colburn & Bentley.
- Viguier, Pierre (2008). Sur les Traces de René Caillié: Le Mali de 1828 Revisité. Versailles, France: Quae. ISBN 978-2-7592-0271-3..
- Toute, René (2005). Histoire de la Recherche Agricole en Afrique Tropicale Francophone. Volume III: Explorateurs et marchands à la recherche de l'Eldorado africain 1800–1885/1890 (PDF). Rome: Organisation des Nations unies pour l'alimentation et l'agriculture (FAO). pp. 18–33. ISBN 92-5-205407-3. Archived from the original (PDF) on 2018-01-28.
