= Niantaga =

- Commune
- Location in Mali
- Coordinates: 12°46′5″N 5°19′40″W
- Country: Mali
- Region: Sikasso Region
- Cercle: Koutiala Cercle

Area
  - Total: 258 km^{2} (100 sq mi)
- Elevation: 294 m (965 ft)

Population (2009)
  - Total: 7,574
  - Density: 29.4/km^{2} (76.0/sq mi)
- Time zone: UTC+0 (GMT)

Niantaga is a rural commune in the Cercle of Koutiala in the Sikasso Region of southern Mali. The commune covers an area of 258 square kilometers and includes 4 villages. In the 2009 census it had a population of 7,574. The village of Koloni, the administrative centre (chef-lieu) of the commune, is 45 km north-northeast of Koutiala.
