= Koromo, Mali =

Koromo
- Commune
- Location in Mali
- Coordinates: 12°40′18″N 5°11′35″W
- Country: Mali
- Region: Sikasso Region
- Cercle: Koutiala Cercle

Area
  - Total: 263 km^{2} (102 sq mi)

Population (2009)
  - Total: 10,890
  - Density: 41.4/km^{2} (107/sq mi)
- Time zone: UTC+0 (GMT)

Koromo is a rural commune in the Cercle of Koutiala in the Sikasso Region of southern Mali. The commune covers an area of 263 square kilometers and includes 5 settlements. In the 2009 census it had a population of 10,890. The village of Bongosso, the administrative centre (chef-lieu) of the commune, is 45 km northeast of Koutiala.
