= Kouniana =

- Commune and village
- Location in Mali
- Coordinates: 12°34′8″N 5°7′37″W
- Country: Mali
- Region: Sikasso Region
- Cercle: Koutiala Cercle

Area
  - Total: 79 km^{2} (31 sq mi)

Population (2009)
  - Total: 3,294
  - Density: 42/km^{2} (110/sq mi)
- Time zone: UTC+0 (GMT)

Kouniana is a village and commune in the Cercle of Koutiala in the Sikasso Region of southern Mali. The commune covers an area of 79 square kilometers and includes 2 settlements. In the 2009 census it had a population of 3,294. The village of Kouniana, the administrative centre (chef-lieu) of the commune, is 45 km northeast of Koutiala.
