= Afrique verte =

French non-governmental organization

Afrique verte ("Green Africa") is a French NGO engaged in the Sahel region of Africa, specifically Mali, Niger and Burkina Faso. Its objective is to ensure food security in the region, and on a larger scale, sustainable development. Its activities include training for better marketing of agriculture related goods, allowing a better exchange between zones of too much and too little food.
