= Moulaye Ahmed Boubacar =

Malian politician

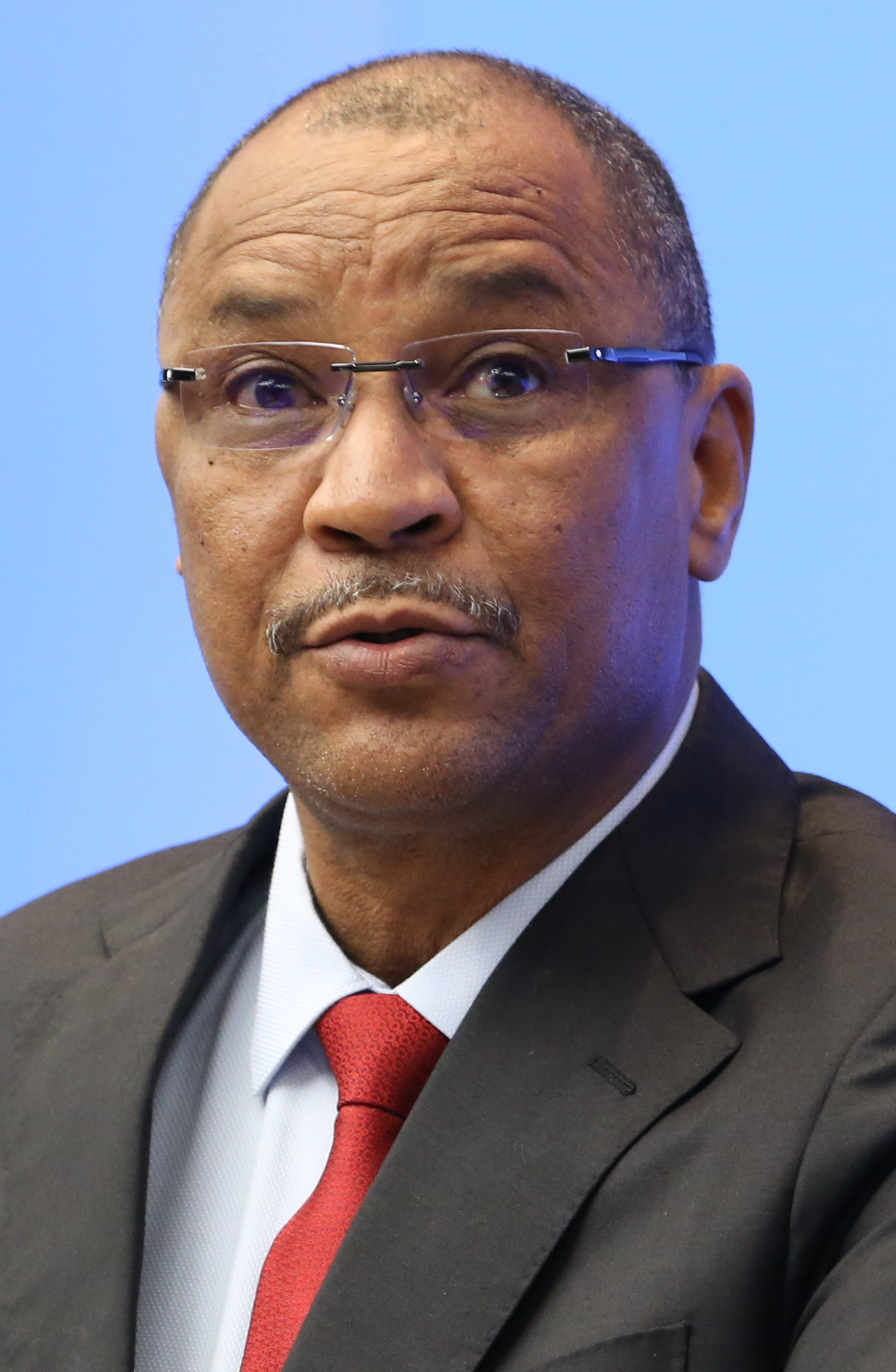
- Boubacar in October 2019

Minister of Agriculture
- In office May 5, 2019 – July 27, 2020
- Succeeded by: Mahmoud Ould Mohamed

Minister of Industrial Development and Investment Promotion
- In office September 2018 – May 5, 2019

Minister of Transport
- In office February 2018 – September 2018
- Succeeded by: Soumana Mory Coulibaly

Personal details
- Born: 1962 (age 63–64) Timbuktu, Mali
- Party: Rally for Mali
- Nickname: Baba Moulaye

Moulaye Ahmed Boubacar, also known as Baba Moulaye, is a Malian politician who served as the Minister of Agriculture from May 2019 to July 2020. Boubacar also served in several other ministerial positions between 2015 and 2019.

== Biography ==
Boubacar was born in Timbuktu, Mali in 1962. He earned a degree in project management, a general studies degree in economics and business management, and a master's degree in human resources management and communication.

In 1993, Boubacar founded "Cerealier du Nord", a cereal company that produces and markets paddy rice in Gao Region, Mali, while transforming the bran into livestock food. His company received funding from the European Development Fund. Boubacar then became a coordinator in ISCOS, an agricultural NGO in Mali. During his time in ISCOS, he introduced new farming techniques and modified varieties of potatoes throughout the Sikasso Region. In 2015, Boubacar was appointed Director General of the Malian Road Authority until 2018.

Boubacar first joined Adema, but then switched to the Alternative 2002 party in 2001, and finally Rally for Mali (RPM). He founded the Sikasso chapter of RPM, and joined the national bureau where he served as the secretary for rural development from 2007 to 2013. He also became the chief of staff within the Ministry of Malians Abroad.

Boubacar first entered the government as the Minister of Transport under Soumeylou Boubèye Maïga. In September 2018, he was appointed as the Minister of Industrial Development and Investment Promotion. On May 5, 2019, Boubacar was appointed as the Minister of Agriculture in the Boubou Cissé government, which he held until July 2020. In February 2020, Boubacar became the secretary-general of RPM in Tombouctou Region.
