= Dadpur =

Village in Odisha, India

Dadpur is a village near Bhawanipatna in Kalahandi district of Orissa state of India.
