= Koutiala Cercle =

Coordinates: 12°20′N 5°35′W

- Cercle
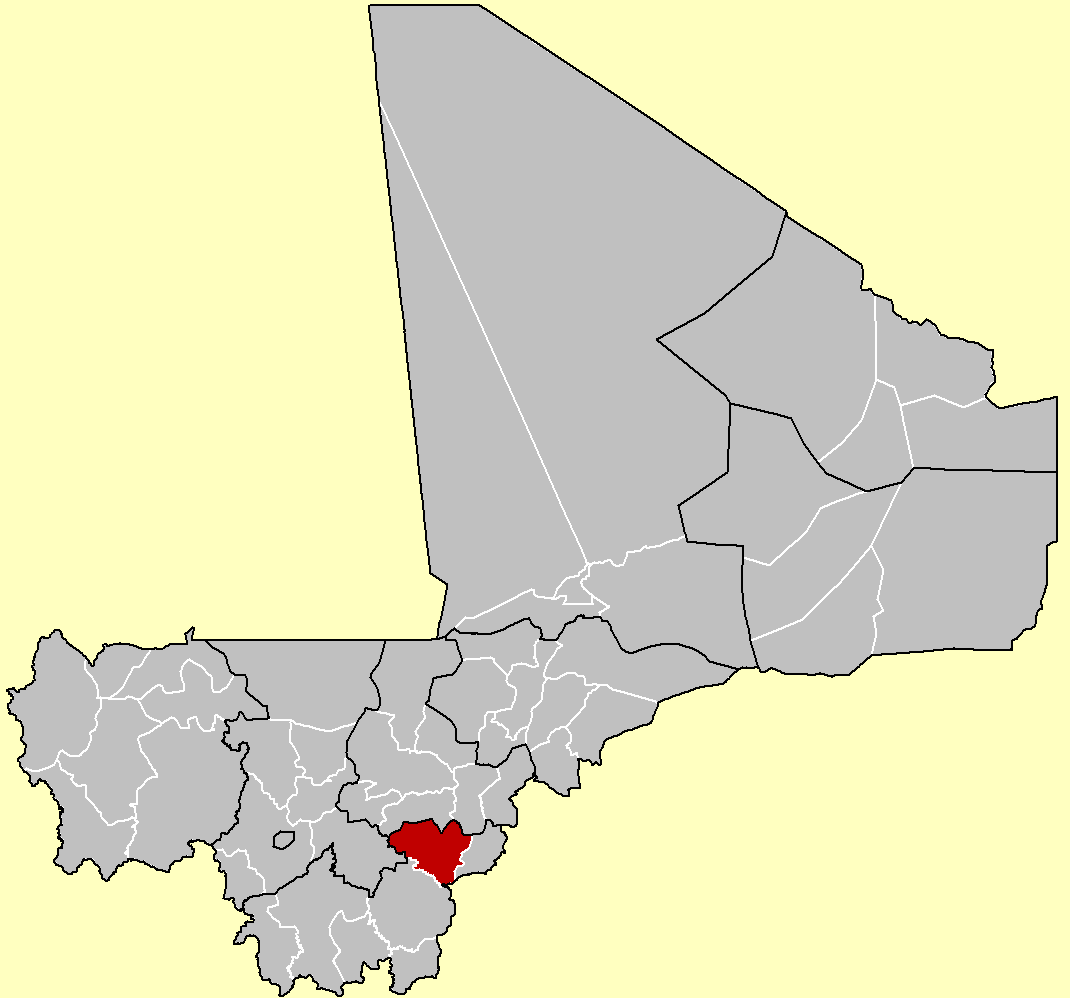
- Location of the Cercle of Koutiala in Mali
- Country: Mali
- Region: Sikasso Region
- Cercle: Koutiala
- Admin HQ (Chef-lieu): Koutiala

Area
  - Total: 8,740 km^{2} (3,370 sq mi)

Population (2009 census)
  - Total: 575,253
  - Density: 65.8/km^{2} (170/sq mi)
- Time zone: UTC+0 (GMT)

Koutiala Cercle is an administrative subdivision of the Sikasso Region of southern Mali. The administrative center is the town of Koutiala. The Cercle is divided into 36 communes.

== Economy ==
Koutiala is the heartland of the cotton production in Mali and its main town is sometimes called "the white gold capital" for its cotton. However, the industry has been affected by stagnation since the 1980s. Aside from cotton it is also noted for grain production, primarily pearl millet, sorghum and maize.

== Administrative divisions ==
The Cercle of Koutiala is divided into 36 communes:

- Diédougou
- Diouradougou Kafo
- Fagui
- Fakolo
- Gouadji Kao
- Goudié Sougouna
- Kafo Faboli
- Kapala
- Karagouana Mallé
- Kolonigué
- Konina
- Koningué
- Konséquéla
- Koromo
- Kouniana
- Koutiala
- Logouana
- M'Pessoba
- Miéna
- N'Golonianasso
- N'Goutjina
- N'Tossoni
- Nafanga
- Nampé
- Niantaga
- Sincina
- Sinkolo
- Songo-Doubacoré
- Songoua
- Sorobasso
- Tao
- Yognogo
- Zanfigué
- Zangasso
- Zanina
- Zébala
