= Koutiala =

- Commune and town
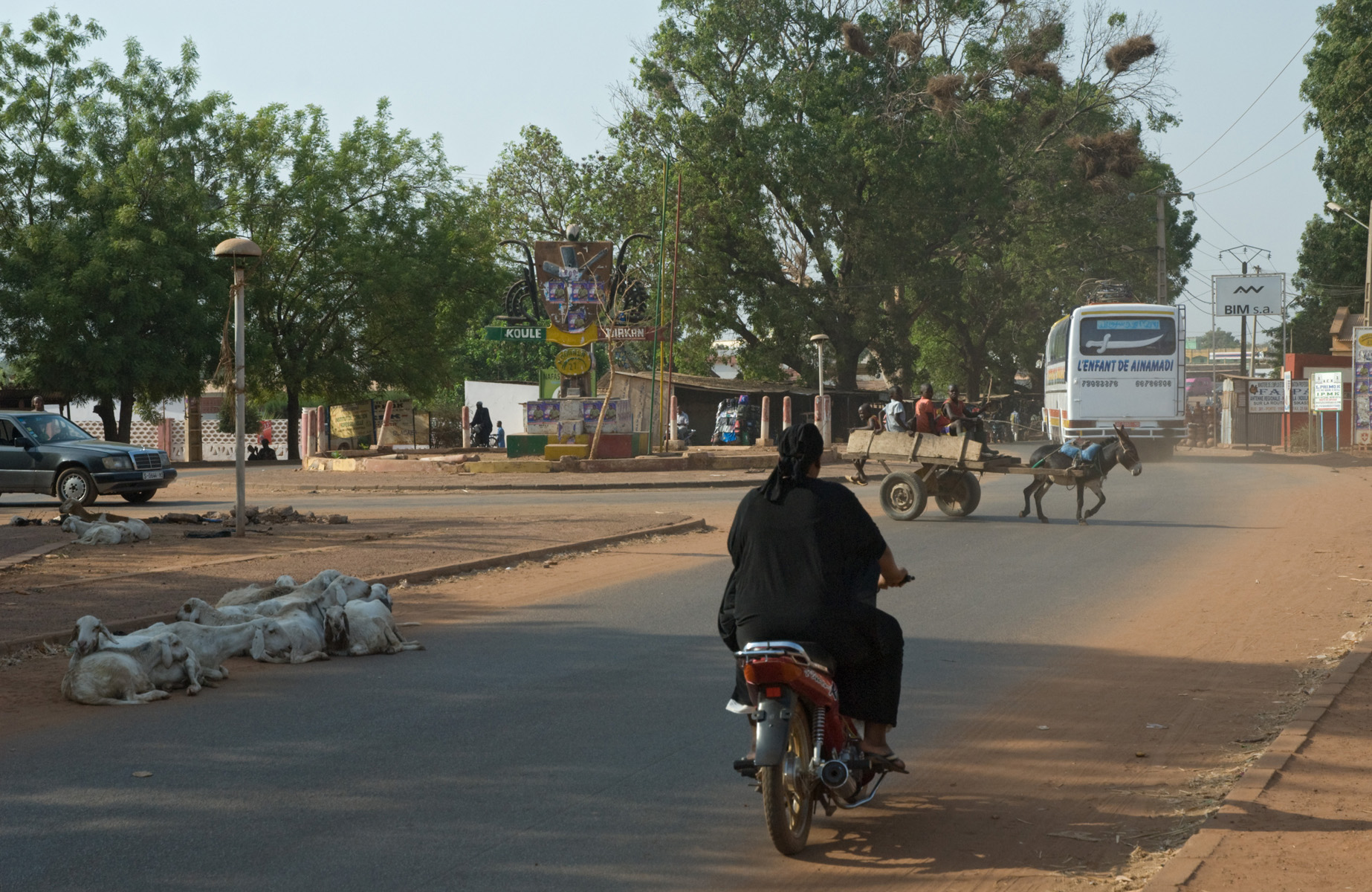
- Koutiala

- Location in Mali
- Coordinates: 12°23′N 5°28′W
- Country: Mali
- Region: Koutiala Region
- Cercle: Koutiala Cercle

Population (2023)
  - Total: 214,271
- Time zone: UTC+0 (GMT)

Koutiala (Bambara: ߞߎߕߌߊߟߊ tr. Kutiala) is a city in Mali, located 140 km north of the city of Sikasso. Koutiala serves as the capital of its administrative Region and Cercle. As of 2023, Koutiala has 214,271 residents.

== History ==
Situated in Minianka country, Koutiala was founded in the 16th century by members of the Coulibaly family from the Bambara kingdom of Segou. It now contains an important hospital for women and children. Koutiala's sister city is Alençon, France.

== Climate ==
Climate data for Koutiala (1991–2020)
Month	Jan	Feb	Mar	Apr	May	Jun	Jul	Aug	Sep	Oct	Nov	Dec	Year
Mean daily maximum °C (°F)	32.5 (90.5)	35.6 (96.1)	38.3 (100.9)	39.1 (102.4)	37.6 (99.7)	34.6 (94.3)	31.6 (88.9)	30.4 (86.7)	31.6 (88.9)	34.6 (94.3)	35.6 (96.1)	33.4 (92.1)	34.6 (94.3)
Daily mean °C (°F)	24.7 (76.5)	27.6 (81.7)	31.0 (87.8)	32.9 (91.2)	31.9 (89.4)	29.4 (84.9)	27.2 (81.0)	26.3 (79.3)	27.0 (80.6)	28.8 (83.8)	27.8 (82.0)	25.2 (77.4)	28.3 (82.9)
Mean daily minimum °C (°F)	16.7 (62.1)	19.6 (67.3)	23.7 (74.7)	26.6 (79.9)	26.2 (79.2)	24.2 (75.6)	22.7 (72.9)	22.3 (72.1)	22.4 (72.3)	23.0 (73.4)	20.0 (68.0)	16.9 (62.4)	22.0 (71.6)
Average precipitation mm (inches)	0.8 (0.03)	1.1 (0.04)	2.2 (0.09)	21.6 (0.85)	64.3 (2.53)	115.5 (4.55)	209.1 (8.23)	269.0 (10.59)	158.8 (6.25)	55.4 (2.18)	2.1 (0.08)	0.3 (0.01)	900.2 (35.43)
Average precipitation days (≥ 1.0 mm)	0.3	0.2	0.9	3.8	7.8	11.3	16.1	18.5	14.6	7.1	0.3	0.0	80.9
Source: World Meteorological Organization

== Economy ==
Koutiala is the heartland of cotton production in Mali and is sometimes called "the white gold capital" for its cotton. However, the industry has been affected by stagnation since the 1980s. Aside from cotton it is also noted for grain production, primarily pearl millet, sorghum and maize. Koutiala is the second most industrial city in Mali, hosting, among others, the Compagnie malienne pour le développement du textile (CMDT) and the Huilerie cotonnière du Mali (HUICOMA).

== Notable people ==
- Ibrahim Boubacar Keïta, president of Mali
- Berthé Aïssata Bengaly, Malian government minister

== Photo Gallery ==
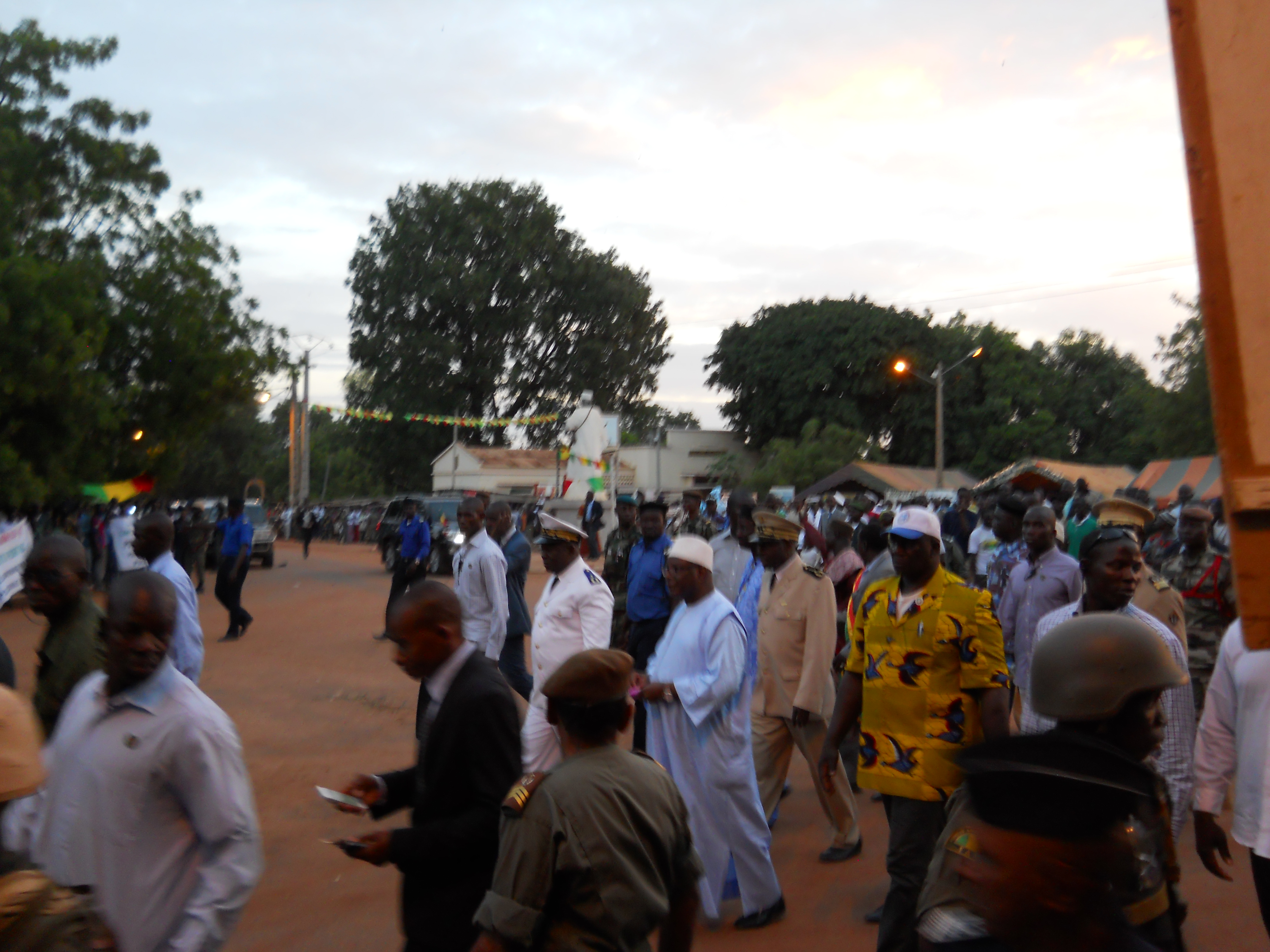
Ibrahim Boubacar Keita and entourage walking in a parade in Koutiala.

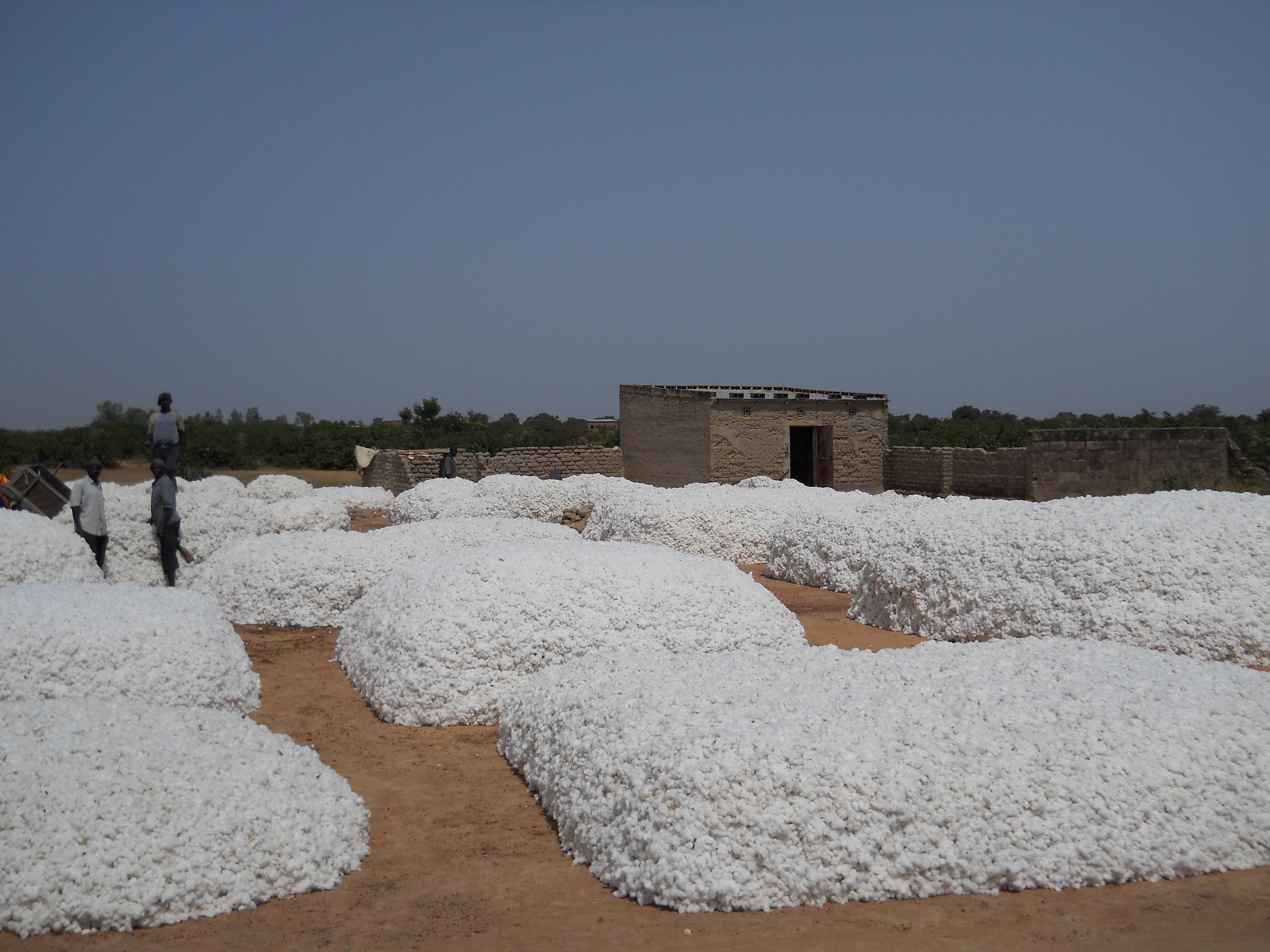
Piles of cotton near Koutiala waiting to be transported

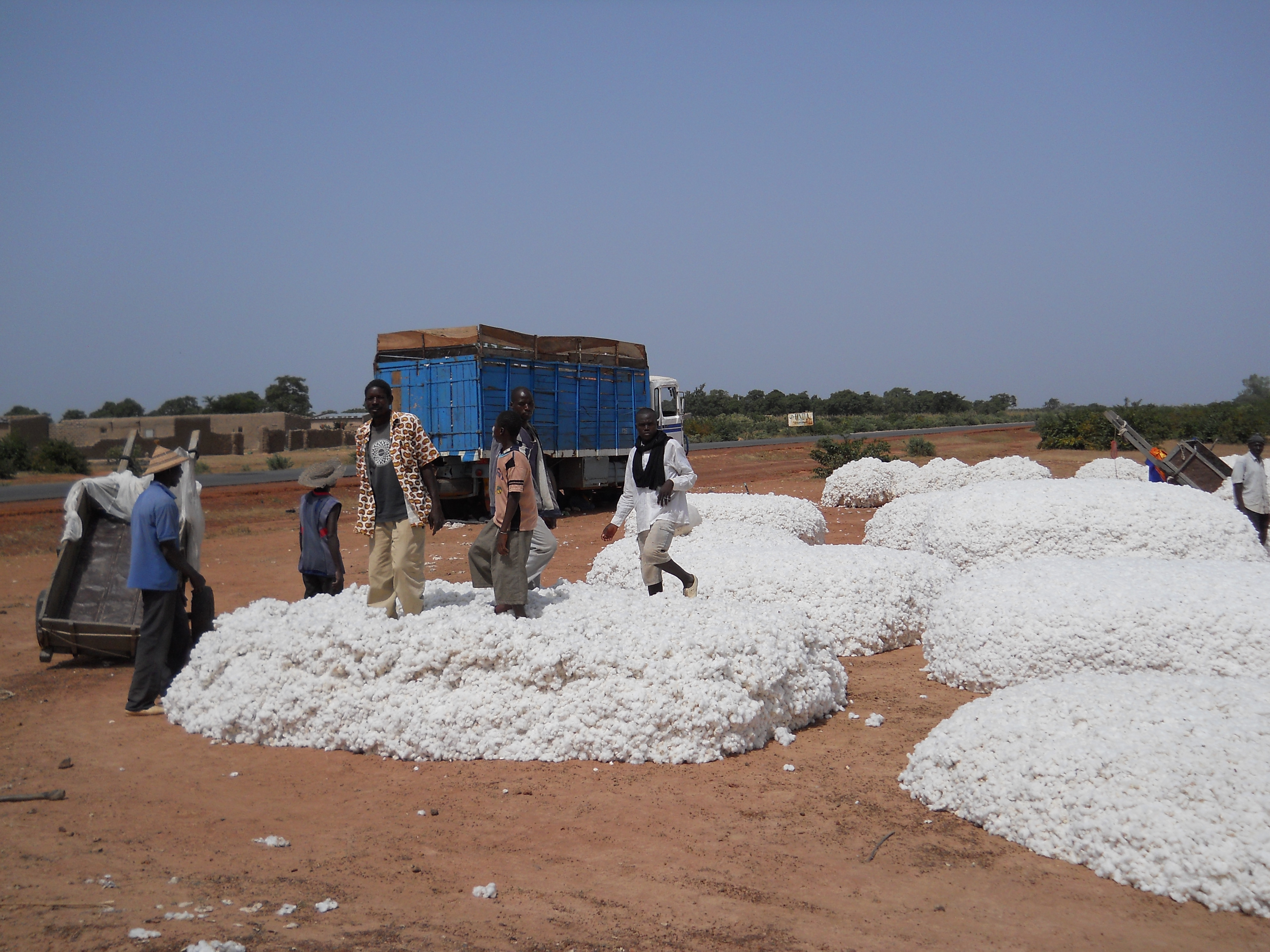
Workers preparing cotton collected near Mpessoba for pickup and transport via truck to and Koutiala

== See also ==
- List of cities in Mali
