= Pangalakaha =

Pangalakaha Pangarikaha
- Village
- Location in Ivory Coast
- Coordinates: 9°23′N 5°29′W
- Country: Ivory Coast
- District: Savanes
- Region: Poro
- Department: Korhogo
- Sub-prefecture: Karakoro
- Time zone: UTC+0 (GMT)

Pangalakaha (also spelled Pangarikaha) is a village in northern Ivory Coast. It is in the sub-prefecture of Karakoro, Korhogo Department, Poro Region, Savanes District.

Pangalakaha was a commune until March 2012, when it became one of 1,126 communes nationwide that were abolished.
