= Pitiengomon =

- Village
- Location in Ivory Coast
- Coordinates: 9°46′N 6°4′W
- Country: Ivory Coast
- District: Savanes
- Region: Poro
- Department: Korhogo
- Sub-prefecture: Niofoin
- Time zone: UTC+0 (GMT)

Pitiengomon is a village in northern Ivory Coast. It is in the sub-prefecture of Niofoin, Korhogo Department, Poro Region, Savanes District.

The village is surrounded by four other villages

: Kanawaha, Talapin, Mara, and Somon. The five villages have a mutual friendship and there is a student association of the five villages together called MUDEPE.

Each year, members of MUDEPE join together after the school year ends and celebrate with a festival in one of the villages which hosts people coming from all over the country being a child from one of those villages.

They celebrate yearly to consolidate the union and friendship. However, Pitiangomon is the biggest village and the most developed among them. It is the central leading village where you can find various stores.

The village Pitiengomon has more than 7,000 inhabitants.

Pitiengomon was a commune until March 2012, when it became one of 1,126 communes nationwide that were abolished.
