= Lamékaha, Poro =

Lamékaha
- Village
- Location in Ivory Coast
- Coordinates: 9°15′N 5°39′W
- Country: Ivory Coast
- District: Savanes
- Region: Poro
- Department: Korhogo
- Sub-prefecture: Tioroniaradougou
- Time zone: UTC+0 (GMT)

Lamékaha is a village in northern Ivory Coast. It is in the sub-prefecture of Tioroniaradougou, Korhogo Department, Poro Region, Savanes District.

Lamékaha was a commune until March 2012, when it became one of 1,126 communes nationwide that were abolished.
