= Koko, Savanes =

Koko
- Village
- Location in Ivory Coast
- Coordinates: 9°9′N 6°7′W
- Country: Ivory Coast
- District: Savanes
- Region: Poro
- Department: Korhogo
- Sub-prefecture: Kanoroba
- Time zone: UTC+0 (GMT)

Koko is a village in northern Ivory Coast. It is in the sub-prefecture of Kanoroba, Korhogo Department, Poro Region, Savanes District.

Koko was a commune until March 2012, when it became one of 1,126 communes nationwide that were abolished.
