= Gbalèkaha =

- Town
- Location in Ivory Coast
- Coordinates: 9°33′N 5°25′W
- Country: Ivory Coast
- District: Savanes
- Region: Poro
- Department: Sinématiali
- Sub-prefecture: Sédiogo
- Time zone: UTC+0 (GMT)

Gbalèkaha is a town in northern Ivory Coast. It is the seat of the sub-prefecture of Sédiogo in Sinématiali Department, Poro Region, Savanes District.
