= Sédiogo =

- Sub-prefecture
- Location in Ivory Coast
- Coordinates: 9°33′N 5°25′W
- Country: Ivory Coast
- District: Savanes
- Region: Poro
- Department: Sinématiali

Population (2014)
  - Total: 5,704
- Time zone: UTC+0 (GMT)

Sédiogo is a sub-prefecture in northern Ivory Coast. It is in Sinématiali Department, Poro Region, Savanes District. The seat of the sub-prefecture is the town of Gbalèkaha.

Sédiogo is one of the few sub-prefectures of Ivory Coast that is not named after a settlement located within the sub-prefecture.

Sédiogo was a commune until March 2012, when it became one of 1,126 communes nationwide that were abolished.

In 2014, the population of the sub-prefecture of Sédiogo was 5,757.

== Villages ==
The 28 villages of the sub-prefecture of Sédiogo and their population in 2014 are:

1. Dokaha (102)
2. Domekaha (200)
3. Fononkaha (345)
4. Gbambalagnenikaha (239)
5. Gbankaha (105)
6. Kaklokaha (217)
7. Kaniakaha (93)
8. Kopikaha (33)
9. Labeguekaha (206)
10. Lablekaha (352)
11. Ladiokaha (74)
12. Lahouokaha (51)
13. Litetienkaha (69)
14. Miguekaha (178)
15. Nadanakaha (81)
16. Nambegnikaha (95)
17. Nambonikaha (246)
18. Nambonnakaha (178)
19. Nongohouelekaha (234)
20. Ouondikaha (139)
21. Pessikaha (105)
22. Sarokaha (111)
23. Sediego (1,786)
24. Taroukaha (91)
25. Tielokaha (37)
26. Yenakalakaha (63)
27. Yobekaha (93)
28. Ziemekaha (234)
