= N'Ganon =

- Town and sub-prefecture
- Location in Ivory Coast
- Coordinates: 9°41′N 6°0′W
- Country: Ivory Coast
- District: Savanes
- Region: Poro
- Department: Korhogo

Population (2014)
  - Total: 5,386
- Time zone: UTC+0 (GMT)

N'Ganon is a town in northern Ivory Coast. It is a sub-prefecture of Korhogo Department in Poro Region, Savanes District.

N'Ganon was a commune until March 2012, when it became one of 1,126 communes nationwide that were abolished.

In 2014, the population of the sub-prefecture of N'Ganon was 5,386.

== Villages ==
The four villages of the sub-prefecture of N'Ganon and their population in 2014 are:

1. Katiaga (1,314)
2. N'ganon (3,548)
3. Sakouma (468)
4. Sindjire (56)
