= Dadiassé =

- Village
- Location in Ivory Coast
- Coordinates: 7°39′N 2°57′W
- Country: Ivory Coast
- District: Zanzan
- Region: Gontougo
- Department: Transua
- Sub-prefecture: Assuéfry
- Time zone: UTC+0 (GMT)

Dadiassé is a village in the far east of Ivory Coast. It is in the sub-prefecture of Assuéfry, Transua Department, Gontougo Region, Zanzan District.

Dadiassé was a commune until March 2012, when it became one of 1,126 communes nationwide that were abolished.
