= Koni, Ivory Coast =

Koni
- Town and sub-prefecture
- Location in Ivory Coast
- Coordinates: 9°35′N 5°41′W
- Country: Ivory Coast
- District: Savanes
- Region: Poro
- Department: Korhogo

Population (2014)
  - Total: 11,948
- Time zone: UTC+0 (GMT)

Koni is a town in northern Ivory Coast. It is a sub-prefecture of Korhogo Department in Poro Region, Savanes District.

Koni was a commune until March 2012, when it became one of 1,126 communes nationwide that were abolished.

In 2014, the population of the sub-prefecture of Koni was 11,948.

== Villages ==
The 10 villages of the sub-prefecture of Koni and their population in 2014 are:

1. Famangaha (579)
2. Kassoumbarga (804)
3. Kawaho (81)
4. Kokaha (2,584)
5. Koni (2,599)
6. Lofine (589)
7. Netionboloba (357)
8. Odoro (1,076)
9. Olleo (3,118)
10. Ponvogo (161)
