= Nafoun =

- Town and sub-prefecture
- Location in Ivory Coast
- Coordinates: 9°20′N 6°13′W
- Country: Ivory Coast
- District: Savanes
- Region: Poro
- Department: Korhogo

Population (2014)
  - Total: 7,990
- Time zone: UTC+0 (GMT)

Lataha is a town in northern Ivory Coast. It is a sub-prefecture of Korhogo Department in Poro Region, Savanes District.

Nafoun was a commune until March 2012, when it became one of 1,126 communes nationwide that were abolished.

In 2014, the population of the sub-prefecture of Nafoun was 7,990.

== Villages ==
The five villages of the sub-prefecture of Nafoun and their population in 2014 are:

1. Dielikaha-Seguekiele (352)
2. Kafongo (309)
3. Nafoun (2,281)
4. Odia (4,331)
5. Zangaha (717)
