= Sohouo =

- Town and sub-prefecture
- Location in Ivory Coast
- Coordinates: 9°37′N 5°40′W
- Country: Ivory Coast
- District: Savanes
- Region: Poro
- Department: Korhogo

Population (2014)
  - Total: 16,029
- Time zone: UTC+0 (GMT)

Sohouo is a town in northern Ivory Coast. It is a sub-prefecture of Korhogo Department in Poro Region, Savanes District.

Sohouo was a commune until March 2012, when it became one of 1,126 communes nationwide that were abolished.

In 2014, the population of the sub-prefecture of Sohouo was 16,029.

== Villages ==
The 11 villages of the sub-prefecture of Sohouo and their population in 2014 are:

1. Bodonon (1,622)
2. Karafigue (1,025)
3. Krignaravogo (364)
4. Noupee 1 (217)
5. Nouple 2 (320)
6. Sielekaha (920)
7. Sohouo (1,676)
8. Zanakaha (1,200)
9. Ziemogokaha (3,612)
10. Zietinkaha (220)
11. Tahouara (4,853)
