= Bouakaha =

Bouakaha Babakaha
- Town and sub-prefecture
- Location in Ivory Coast
- Coordinates: 9°37′N 5°27′W
- Country: Ivory Coast
- District: Savanes
- Region: Poro
- Department: Sinématiali

Population (2014)
  - Total: 5,704
- Time zone: UTC+0 (GMT)

Bouakaha (also known as Babakaha) is a town in northern Ivory Coast. It is a sub-prefecture of Sinématiali Department in Poro Region, Savanes District.

Bouakaha was a commune until March 2012, when it became one of 1,126 communes nationwide that were abolished.

In 2014, the population of the sub-prefecture of Bouakaha was 5,704.

== Villages ==
The nine villages of the sub-prefecture of Bouakaha and their population in 2014 are:

1. Bahouakaha (4 066)
2. Dokinikaha (73)
3. Kagnibelekaha (227)
4. Ladonakaha (101)
5. Ladounkaha (176)
6. Namekaha (145)
7. Nongotienekaha 1 (664)
8. Peguekaha (160)
9. Poromoukaha (92)
