= Kiémou =

- Town and sub-prefecture
- Location in Ivory Coast
- Coordinates: 9°4′N 5°33′W
- Country: Ivory Coast
- District: Savanes
- Region: Poro
- Department: Korhogo

Population (2014)
  - Total: 22,422
- Time zone: UTC+0 (GMT)

Kiémou is a town in northern Ivory Coast. It is a sub-prefecture of Korhogo Department in Poro Region, Savanes District.

Kiémou was a commune until March 2012, when it became one of 1,126 communes nationwide that were abolished.

In 2014, the population of the sub-prefecture of Kiémou was 22,422.

== Villages ==
The 24 villages of the sub-prefecture of Kiémou and their population in 2014 are:

1. Bemavogo (1,233)
2. Blaoura (428)
3. Dalangbo (1,448)
4. Diedana (171)
5. Diegon (1,135)
6. Diembekaha (593)
7. Fougniguekaha (173)
8. Gogbala (730)
9. Kafine (2,277)
10. Kafoungo (170)
11. Kiemou (3,908)
12. Kodanakaha (87)
13. Koko (1,132)
14. Labelekaha (2,198)
15. Lonakaha (609)
16. Massogo (383)
17. Nalourgokaha (654)
18. Natiemboro (1,591)
19. Noufre (501)
20. Petonkaha (418)
21. Sandonakaha (1,002)
22. Siolokaha (1,045)
23. Tienekaha (146)
24. Wonnongakaha (390)
