= Kagbolodougou =

- Town and sub-prefecture
- Location in Ivory Coast
- Coordinates: 9°24′N 5°24′W
- Country: Ivory Coast
- District: Savanes
- Region: Poro
- Department: Sinématiali

Population (2014)
  - Total: 9,356
- Time zone: UTC+0 (GMT)

Kagbolodougou is a town in northern Ivory Coast. It is a sub-prefecture of Sinématiali Department in Poro Region, Savanes District.

Kagbolodougou was a commune until March 2012, when it became one of 1,126 communes nationwide that were abolished.

In 2014, the population of the sub-prefecture of Kagbolodougou was 9,356.

== Villages ==
The 14 villages of the sub-prefecture of Kagbolodougou and their population in 2014 are:

1. Berkaha (420)
2. Dohiriguekaha (1,941)
3. Fodiolokaha (1,594)
4. Fodonkaha (1,193)
5. Gnabelekaha (107)
6. Kagbolodougou (2,815)
7. Klolekaha (167)
8. Kongokaha (322)
9. Lagninekaha (90)
10. Naboukaha (40)
11. Nambeguekaha (32)
12. Nongofiguekaha (14)
13. Nonnanagoun (504)
14. Yediedenekaha (117)
