= Kombolokoura =

- Town and sub-prefecture
- Location in Ivory Coast
- Coordinates: 9°20′N 5°53′W
- Country: Ivory Coast
- District: Savanes
- Region: Poro
- Department: Korhogo

Population (2014)
  - Total: 5,739
- Time zone: UTC+0 (GMT)

Kombolokoura is a town in northern Ivory Coast. It is a sub-prefecture of Korhogo Department in Poro Region, Savanes District.

Kombolokoura was a commune until March 2012, when it became one of 1,126 communes nationwide that were abolished.

In 2014, the population of the sub-prefecture of Kombolokoura was 5,739.

== Villages ==
The eight villages of the sub-prefecture of Kombolokoura and their population in 2014 are:

1. Kabevogo (466)
2. Karaniene (347)
3. Kazievogo (323)
4. Kombolokoura (2,581)
5. Litio (627)
6. N'djanhon (392)
7. Ouombolo (825)
8. Tialoho (178)
