= Dassoungboho =

Dassoungboho Dassimmbogo
- Town and sub-prefecture
- Location in Ivory Coast
- Coordinates: 9°23′N 5°48′W
- Country: Ivory Coast
- District: Savanes
- Region: Poro
- Department: Korhogo

Population (2014)
  - Total: 6,363
- Time zone: UTC+0 (GMT)

Dassoungboho (also spelled Dassimmbogo) is a town in northern Ivory Coast. It is a sub-prefecture of Korhogo Department in Poro Region, Savanes District.

Dassoungboho was a commune until March 2012, when it became one of 1,126 communes nationwide that were abolished.

In 2014, the population of the sub-prefecture of Dassoungboho was 6,363.

== Villages ==
The 21 villages of the sub-prefecture of Dassoungboho and their population in 2014 are:

1. Dassoumble (143)
2. Dassoungboho (1,361)
3. Doforonvogo (616)
4. Domenevogo (106)
5. Fonanvogo (602)
6. Ganon (390)
7. Kadiavogo (144)
8. Kakohovogo (234)
9. Kapounon (238)
10. Katanvogo (442)
11. Korokaravogo (132)
12. Louhoua (105)
13. Mehefolovogo (209)
14. Nambolo (245)
15. Ouanlourgovogo (126)
16. Piebevogo (121)
17. Sandia (270)
18. Sionkatenevogo (229)
19. Sitiara (195)
20. Sonanvogo (125)
21. Tallere (330)
