= Lataha =

- Town and sub-prefecture
- Location in Ivory Coast
- Coordinates: 9°34′N 5°35′W
- Country: Ivory Coast
- District: Savanes
- Region: Poro
- Department: Korhogo

Population (2014)
  - Total: 30,745
- Time zone: UTC+0 (GMT)

Lataha is a town in northern Ivory Coast. It is a sub-prefecture of Korhogo Department in Poro Region, Savanes District.

Lataha was a commune until March 2012, when it became one of 1,126 communes nationwide that were abolished.

In 2014, the population of the sub-prefecture of Lataha was 30,745.

== Villages ==
The 66 villages of the sub-prefecture of Lataha and their population in 2014 are:

1. Adamavogo (102)
2. Bevogo 2 (934)
3. Dassoumblevogo (12)
4. Djavogo (305)
5. Dorogo (361)
6. Doulourovogo (889)
7. Faranikan (1,225)
8. Fononvogo (481)
9. Fossonvogo (272)
10. Gbandokaha (121)
11. Gnenegnavogo (106)
12. Gotanhagavogo (93)
13. Kafagavogo (312)
14. Kafiokaha 2 (770)
15. Kahouavogo (219)
16. Kanidiovogo (698)
17. Kapelavogo (67)
18. Kataha (323)
19. Katangavogo (235)
20. Keferekaha (53)
21. Kohotieri (2,991)
22. Kopalavogo (146)
23. Kopiemonvogo (862)
24. Korokaha (209)
25. Kouavogo (1,031)
26. Koudomavogo (334)
27. Koukalargavogo (176)
28. Koulodjovogo (148)
29. Kounontovogo (215)
30. Kpangbovogo (334)
31. Lablevogo (77)
32. Ladanakaha (491)
33. Ladiovogo (157)
34. Lagbessiguevogo (336)
35. Lagnenevogo (385)
36. Lagneniguevogo (274)
37. Lataha (5,693)
38. Lelouroukaha (537)
39. Lognonkaha (228)
40. Longnonvogo (140)
41. Nabanavogo (187)
42. Nabekounouvogo (363)
43. Nagnanigavogo (35)
44. Nagnenevogo (418)
45. Nahouolavogo (1,433)
46. Nambevogo (314)
47. Namenevogo (202)
48. Nangakaha (1,337)
49. Nangbalavogo (236)
50. Nangolovogo (340)
51. Navoungavogo (170)
52. Nonlourouvogo (106)
53. Nonplevogo (63)
54. Nonsorikaha (19)
55. Ouebevogo (135)
56. Seridiakaha (594)
57. Sionkeletienvogo (172)
58. Solonadiele (165)
59. Solonadioula (166)
60. Sotianhouavogo (223)
61. Soungoukaha (419)
62. Tianvolovogo (174)
63. Tiekourgovogo (275)
64. Wonlourougovogo (95)
65. Wonvagavogo (293)
66. Yapoidiovogo (469)
