= Sandala, Ivory Coast =

Sandala
- Village
- Location in Ivory Coast
- Coordinates: 8°7′N 6°28′W
- Country: Ivory Coast
- District: Woroba
- Region: Worodougou
- Department: Séguéla
- Sub-prefecture: Dualla
- Time zone: UTC+0 (GMT)

Sandala is a village in northwestern Ivory Coast. It is in the sub-prefecture of Dualla, Séguéla Department, Worodougou Region, Woroba District.

Sandala was a commune until March 2012, when it became one of 1,126 communes nationwide that were abolished.
