= Napiéolédougou =

- Town, sub-prefecture, and commune
- Nickname: Napié
- Location in Ivory Coast
- Coordinates: 9°18′N 5°35′W
- Country: Ivory Coast
- District: Savanes
- Region: Poro
- Department: Korhogo

Population (2014)
  - Total: 23,297
- Time zone: UTC+0 (GMT)

Napiéolédougou (often shortened to Napié) is a town in northern Ivory Coast. It is a sub-prefecture and commune of Korhogo Department in Poro Region, Savanes District.

In 2014, the population of the sub-prefecture of Napiéolédougou was 23,297.

== Villages ==
The 62 villages of the sub-prefecture of Napiéolédougou and their population in 2014 are:

1. Dagbarikaha (246)
2. Denakaha (39)
3. Diatonkaha (113)
4. Djabilokaha (115)
5. Doulouroukaha (257)
6. Famorodougou (293)
7. Flanakaha (226)
8. Gnonkaha (212)
9. Gossakaha (198)
10. Guefienkaha (215)
11. Kagbanikaha (352)
12. Kakologo (537)
13. Kolo (491)
14. Korokaha (140)
15. Lagomonkaha (292)
16. Lessonkaha (98)
17. Lofinekaha (462)
18. Lomonkaha (126)
19. Nahouokaha (555)
20. Nakroubelikaha (341)
21. Nalokaha (310)
22. Nalolokaha (34)
23. Nambelekaha (224)
24. Napieoledougou (5 884)
25. Navanakaha (194)
26. Navinekaha (422)
27. Navonogokaha (487)
28. Nemetekaha Ou Nogotinkaha (371)
29. Nongokaha (245)
30. Nongotiokaha (294)
31. Ouafiakaha (581)
32. Oualougokaha (247)
33. Ouanakaha (158)
34. Ouenienekaha (35)
35. Ouolokaha (112)
36. Pligakaha (266)
37. Pombikaha (86)
38. Takpalakaha (545)
39. Tenemongokaha (116)
40. Tiangakaha (246)
41. Diebakaha (168)
42. Diofounkaha (368)
43. Dobelakaha (263)
44. Dokaha (100)
45. Yenessokaha (300)
46. Koumbolikaha (220)
47. Penafiguekaha (484)
48. Fakaha (206)
49. Gnenessionkaha (142)
50. Kassiele (380)
51. Kokaha (456)
52. Kolekaha (171)
53. Ladanakaha (102)
54. Logaha (338)
55. Nambatiourkaha (730)
56. Namogokaha (66)
57. Nongofionkaha (80)
58. Peguekaha (189)
59. Pimakaha (260)
60. Samorikaha (659)
61. Sirikolikaha (125)
62. Tiolokaha (1 325)
