= Komborodougou =

- Town, sub-prefecture, and commune
- Location in Ivory Coast
- Coordinates: 9°20′N 5°26′W
- Country: Ivory Coast
- District: Savanes
- Region: Poro
- Department: Korhogo

Population (2014)
  - Total: 12,947
- Time zone: UTC+0 (GMT)

Komborodougou is a town in northern Ivory Coast. It is a sub-prefecture and commune of Korhogo Department in Poro Region, Savanes District. The border of Vallée du Bandama District is six kilometres east of the town.

In 2014, the population of the sub-prefecture of Komborodougou was 12,947.

== Villages ==
The 43 villages of the sub-prefecture of Komborodougou and their population in 2014 are:

1. Dabakaha (124)
2. Dandoumakaha (301)
3. Dossemekaha (177)
4. Komborodougou (4 329)
5. Lagbokaha (541)
6. Nabieriguekaha (104)
7. Naborikaha (132)
8. Nangakaha (114)
9. Nongogninekaha (65)
10. Sibirikaha (1 023)
11. Tiafiguekaha (112)
12. Tiefannakaha (26)
13. Zonhouakaha (134)
14. Bossodougou (126)
15. Dabokaha (185)
16. Dogninekaha (152)
17. Gnamatoloh (228)
18. Gneguidiokaha (227)
19. Gnenedokaha (92)
20. Kafonnonkaha (140)
21. Katiekaha (73)
22. Kpokaha (223)
23. Lelekaha (127)
24. Nakaha (731)
25. Nakalakaha (208)
26. Nambatiokaha (54)
27. Nambekaha (189)
28. Nangounonkaha (45)
29. Nazinekaha (264)
30. Nemelokaha (492)
31. Nibolikaha (76)
32. Ouonsorikaha (486)
33. Pangbakaha (129)
34. Pederikaha (85)
35. Pevrokaha (149)
36. Pliguetiankaha (80)
37. Sanlokaha (186)
38. Siekaha (292)
39. Sologokaha (96)
40. Tchangakaha (228)
41. Tchonkaha (187)
42. Tenenakaha (130)
43. Yereminkaha (85)
