= Savanes =

Savanes may refer to:

- Savanes Region, Togo
- Savanes Region (Ivory Coast), the defunct region
- Savanes District, Ivory Coast, the current district
