= Kanoroba =

- Town and sub-prefecture
- Location in Ivory Coast
- Coordinates: 9°6′N 6°8′W
- Country: Ivory Coast
- District: Savanes
- Region: Poro
- Department: Korhogo

Population (2014)
  - Total: 18,555
- Time zone: UTC+0 (GMT)

Kanoroba is a town in northern Ivory Coast. It is a sub-prefecture of Korhogo Department in Poro Region, Savanes District.

Kanoroba was a commune until March 2012, when it became one of 1,126 communes nationwide that were abolished.

In 2014, the population of the sub-prefecture of Kanoroba was 18,555.

== Villages ==
The 16 villages of the sub-prefecture of Kanoroba and their population in 2014 are:

1. Bodo (644)
2. Gama (2,397)
3. Gnenegnerkaha (720)
4. Kanoroba (6,739)
5. Kaziomon (436)
6. Kiere (2,591)
7. Kognonkaha (645)
8. Koko (634)
9. Kolokaha (897)
10. Nabelekaha (593)
11. Noufre (130)
12. Nazewekaha (542)
13. Sedakaha (355)
14. Senakaha (303)
15. Sibirinakaha (805)
16. Sindia (124)
