= Sinématiali =

- Town, sub-prefecture, and commune
- Location in Ivory Coast
- Coordinates: 9°35′N 5°23′W
- Country: Ivory Coast
- District: Savanes
- Region: Poro
- Department: Sinématiali

Population (2014)
  - Total: 37,795
- Time zone: UTC+0 (GMT)

Sinématiali is a town in northern Ivory Coast. It is a sub-prefecture of and the seat of Sinématiali Department in Poro Region, Savanes District. Sinématiali is also a commune.

In 2014, the population of the sub-prefecture of Sinématiali was 37,795.

== History ==
Sinematiali was attacked by Babemba Traore, Faama of Sikasso, in 1892.

== Villages ==
The 91 villages of the sub-prefecture of Sinématiali and their population in 2014 are:

1. Babakaha (88)
2. Barakaha (23)
3. Dahouokaha (52)
4. Danganifesso (116)
5. Denikaha (218)
6. Dinkaha (47)
7. Donakpakaha (46)
8. Donassokaha (29)
9. Donatekaha (150)
10. Dorokaha (61)
11. Dotiekaha (123)
12. Fannikaha (153)
13. Gbambalagnongbokaha (1 610)
14. Gbambalakaha (128)
15. Gbatienekaha (33)
16. Gnouakaha (45)
17. Katingaha (97)
18. Kolokaha (217)
19. Kolotchounkaha (1 370)
20. Koulokaha (544)
21. Koulotiakaha (489)
22. Kpakaha (36)
23. Kpongbokaha (554)
24. Lagnenagakaha (43)
25. Lavagakaha (19)
26. Legbrelekaha (394)
27. Lokaha 1 (202)
28. Lokaha 2 (323)
29. Lokoli (208)
30. Lomekaha (228)
31. Nagbanakaha (57)
32. Nakouroubelekaha 1 (129)
33. Nambanakaha (34)
34. Nambeguekaha (45)
35. Nangolekaha (261)
36. Nangorokaha (384)
37. Napalakaha (107)
38. Napletekaha (101)
39. Natokaha (47)
40. Niezognakaha (38)
41. Odiekaha (124)
42. Onagakaha (61)
43. Oualekaha (111)
44. Pelaridjokaha (96)
45. Pelebinvogo (150)
46. Pelegaha (48)
47. Sinematiali (10 163)
48. Sitchonrikaha (230)
49. Tchogaha (40)
50. Tepogokaha (86)
51. Tiebalakaha (95)
52. Tienikaha (47)
53. Tiongofolokaha (1 901)
54. Tonofolokaha 1 (36)
55. Tonofolokaha 2 (43)
56. Torkaha (32)
57. Waguilekaha (26)
58. Yakalakaha 1 (92)
59. Yakalakaha 2 (162)
60. Yegnonkaha (259)
61. Yegnougonikaga (72)
62. Zeninkaha (57)
63. Ziekaha (398)
64. Baralokaha (103)
65. Dabolokaha Ou Gniguessorokaha (190)
66. Daboungo (1 090)
67. Danankaha (2 415)
68. Daralokaha (27)
69. Donamakaha Ou Donamakakaha (162)
70. Fougniguekaha (74)
71. Gbahekaha Ou Nagnaniguekaha (95)
72. Gbamakokaha (137)
73. Gbandjadjoungo (926)
74. Kakpokaha (323)
75. Klogniguekaha / Kouloniguekaha (87)
76. Korokinikaha (56)
77. Koulanakaha (90)
78. Labeguekaha (98)
79. Lagniguekaha (203)
80. Lodjokaha 2 (650)
81. Miteguekaha (869)
82. Nabounakaha / Navanakaha (29)
83. Nakouroubelekaha 2 (1 814)
84. Nantiokaha /Kafokaha (224)
85. Nongonpikaha (363)
86. Ouankaha (90)
87. Ouolo / Nongoplekaha (4 018)
88. Tchatonkaha (85)
89. Tiogaha (36)
90. Tiornakaha (75)
91. Yebehouignonkaha (288)
