= Attiékoi =

- Village
- Location in Ivory Coast
- Coordinates: 5°32′N 3°58′W
- Country: Ivory Coast
- District: Abidjan
- Sub-prefectures: Brofodoumé
- Time zone: UTC+0 (GMT)

Attiékoi is a village in southern Ivory Coast. It is located in the sub-prefecture of Brofodoumé in the Autonomous District of Abidjan. Prior to 2011, it was in the Abidjan Department, Lagunes Region.

Attiékoi was a commune until March 2012, when it became one of 1,126 communes nationwide that were abolished.
