= Dualla =

Dualla may refer to:

- Dualla, County Tipperary
- Dualla, Ivory Coast
- The Duala people of Cameroon
- The Duala language spoken by that people
- Douala, a city in Cameroon
- Anastasia Dualla, a character from the Battlestar Galactica television series
