= Niellé =

- Town, sub-prefecture, and commune
- Location in Ivory Coast
- Coordinates: 10°12′N 5°38′W
- Country: Ivory Coast
- District: Savanes
- Region: Tchologo
- Department: Ouangolodougou

Area
  - Total: 655 km^{2} (253 sq mi)
- Elevation: 335 m (1,099 ft)

Population (2021)
  - Total: 48,524
  - Density: 74.1/km^{2} (192/sq mi)
  - Town: 19,116
- (2014 census)
- Time zone: UTC+0 (GMT)

Niellé is a town in the far north of Ivory Coast. It is a sub-prefecture and commune of Ouangolodougou Department in Tchologo Region, Savanes District. The border with Mali is located 30 kilometres north of town.

Niellé is in the sub-Saharan Sahel savanna biogeography region, which is characterised by grasslands with trees, such as the baobab (Adansonia digitata), umbrella thorn acacia (Acacia tortilis) and other species.

In 2021, the population of the sub-prefecture of Niellé was 48,524.

== Villages ==
The 10 villages of the sub-prefecture of Niellé and their population in 2014 are:

1. Fala (537)
2. Nalogo (1 327)
3. Niellé (19 116)
4. Békaha (427)
5. Diellé (1 784)
6. Gbinzo 1 (2 962)
7. Kassérégué (575)
8. Kassiongokoro (1 654)
9. Korifon (242)
10. Louholo (398)
