= Sandala =

Sandala may refer to:

- Sandala, Israel, a village in northern Israel
- Sandala, Côte d'Ivoire
- A Tamil variation on Chandala, an opprobrious term in Sanskritic literature.
