= Brofodoumé =

- Sub-prefecture
- Location in Ivory Coast
- Coordinates: 5°31′N 3°56′W
- Country: Ivory Coast
- District: Abidjan

Population (2014)
  - Total: 15,842
- Time zone: UTC+0 (GMT)

Brofodoumé is a sub-prefecture in south-eastern Ivory Coast. It is a suburb of Abidjan and is one of four sub-prefectures of Abidjan Autonomous District. Brofodoumé is about 15 kilometres northeast of Abidjan.

The seat of the sub-prefecture is Bofanmun. Brofodoumé is one of the few sub-prefectures of Ivory Coast that is not named after its seat. Villages in the sub-prefecture include Attiékoi.

Prior to the 2011 reorganisation of the subdivisions of Ivory Coast, Brofodoumé was part of the Lagunes Region. Brofodoumé was a commune until March 2012, when it became one of 1,126 communes nationwide that were abolished.
