= Bofanmun =

- Town
- Location in Ivory Coast
- Coordinates: 5°31′N 3°56′W
- Country: Ivory Coast
- District: Abidjan
- Sub-prefecture: Brofodoumé
- Time zone: UTC+0 (GMT)

Bofanmun is a town in southeastern Ivory Coast. It is a suburb of Abidjan and is the seat of the sub-prefecture of Brofodoumé. Bofanmun is about 15 kilometres northeast of Abidjan.
