= Mékro =

- Town and sub-prefecture
- Location in Ivory Coast
- Coordinates: 7°9′N 4°40′W
- Country: Ivory Coast
- District: Lacs
- Region: N'Zi
- Department: Kouassi-Kouassikro

Population (2014)
  - Total: 6,495
- Time zone: UTC+0 (GMT)

Mékro is a town in Ivory Coast. It is a sub-prefecture of Kouassi-Kouassikro Department in N'Zi Region, Lacs District.

Mékro was a commune until March 2012, when it became one of 1,126 communes nationwide that were abolished.

In 2014, the sub-prefecture of Mékro had a population of 6,495.

== Villages ==
The 11 villages of the sub-prefecture of Mékro and their populations in 2014 are:

1. Abo-Kouassikro (665)
2. Adi-Koffikro (568)
3. Dibiessou (444)
4. Dionan-Yakro (615)
5. Guimbo - Ndolikro (1,304)
6. Konan-Ouphouetkro (170)
7. Kroue-N'dolikro (469)
8. Mékro (747)
9. N'gasso-Koffikro (257)
10. Sassaoukro (785)
11. Yoboué-N'dolikro (471)
