= Tioroniaradougou =

- Town and sub-prefecture
- Nickname: Tioro
- Location in Ivory Coast
- Coordinates: 9°22′N 5°38′W
- Country: Ivory Coast
- District: Savanes
- Region: Poro
- Department: Korhogo

Population (2014)
  - Total: 15,485
- Time zone: UTC+0 (GMT)

Tioroniaradougou (often shortened to Tioro) is a town in northern Ivory Coast. It is a sub-prefecture and commune of Korhogo Department in Poro Region, Savanes District.

In 2014, the population of the sub-prefecture of Tioroniaradougou was 15,485.

== Villages ==
The 27 villages of the sub-prefecture of Tioroniaradougou and their population in 2014 are:

1. Djemitene (262)
2. Fahala (187)
3. Fodonzologo (709)
4. Gbolokaha (202)
5. Kaforo (509)
6. Katia (1 631)
7. Kenifonkaha (219)
8. Kolokaha (164)
9. Nahoualakaha (1 105)
10. Nambekaha (957)
11. Nigbelekaha (188)
12. Nissonkaha (283)
13. Pindiakaha (97)
14. Sologo (671)
15. Tagbanga (252)
16. Tiebeyakaha (293)
17. Tioroniaradougou (3 786)
18. Torkaha (303)
19. Zanakpokaha (466)
20. Ziefiguekaha (254)
21. Fegboho (297)
22. Foro (1 010)
23. Kafonnon (302)
24. Lamekaha (458)
25. Sanransorovogo (120)
26. Sissian (673)
27. Zienkolokoro (87)
