= Sirasso =

- Town, sub-prefecture, and commune
- Location in Ivory Coast
- Coordinates: 9°17′N 6°6′W
- Country: Ivory Coast
- District: Savanes
- Region: Poro
- Department: Korhogo

Population (2014)
  - Total: 28,160
- Time zone: UTC+0 (GMT)

Sirasso is a town in northern Ivory Coast. It is a sub-prefecture and commune of Korhogo Department in Poro Region, Savanes District.

In 2014, the population of the sub-prefecture of Sirasso was 28,160.

== Villages ==
The 14 villages of the sub-prefecture of Sirasso and their population in 2014 are:

1. Nangberekaha (478)
2. Peletiminin (198)
3. Sirasso (8 869)
4. Soumon (225)
5. Dagba (3 610)
6. Dokaha (884)
7. Lopin (386)
8. M'balla (2 734)
9. Nouhouo (355)
10. Sakpele (1 977)
11. Sambokaha (1 711)
12. Seguebe (758)
13. Soloboho (258)
14. Tallere (5 717)
