= Mayo, Ivory Coast =

Mayo
- Town and commune
- Location in Ivory Coast
- Coordinates: 5°48′N 6°39′W
- Country: Ivory Coast
- District: Bas-Sassandra
- Region: Nawa
- Department: Soubré
- Sub-prefecture: Soubré
- Time zone: UTC+0 (GMT)

Mayo is a town in south-western Ivory Coast. It is a commune in Soubré sub-prefecture of Soubré Department, Nawa Region, Bas-Sassandra District. Since 2012, Mayo is the only commune seat that is not also the seat of a sub-prefecture.

The commune was established in April 1998.
