= Kanakono =

- Town, sub-prefecture, and commune
- Location in Ivory Coast
- Coordinates: 10°21′N 6°14′W
- Country: Ivory Coast
- District: Savanes
- Region: Bagoué
- Department: Tengréla

Area
  - Total: 465 km^{2} (180 sq mi)

Population (2021 census)
  - Total: 30,630
  - Density: 65.9/km^{2} (171/sq mi)
  - Town: 10,127
- (2014 census)
- Time zone: UTC+0 (GMT)

Kanakono is a town in the far north of Ivory Coast. It is a sub-prefecture and commune of Tengréla Department in Bagoué Region, Savanes District. The border with Mali is five kilometres east of town.

In 2021, the population of the sub-prefecture of Kanakono was 30,630.

== Villages ==
The 6 villages of the sub-prefecture of Kanakono and their population in 2014 are:

1. Kanakono (10 127)
2. Lomara (4 727)
3. Popo (2 248)
4. Pourou (2 834)
5. Sissengue (2 463)
6. Zanikaha (502)
