= Kouassi-Kouassikro =

- Town, sub-prefecture, and commune
- Location in Ivory Coast
- Coordinates: 7°1′N 4°43′W
- Country: Ivory Coast
- District: Lacs
- Region: N'Zi
- Department: Kouassi-Kouassikro

Population (2014)
  - Total: 23,117
- Time zone: UTC+0 (GMT)

Kouassi-Kouassikro is a town in central Ivory Coast. It is a sub-prefecture of and the seat of Kouassi-Kouassikro Department in N'Zi Region, Lacs District. Kouassi-Kouassikro is also a commune.

In 2014, the population of the sub-prefecture of Kouassi-Kouassikro was 23,117.

== Villages ==
The 19 villages of the sub-prefecture of Kouassi-Kouassikro and their population in 2014 are:

1. Agbanikro (539)
2. Ahouzankro (682)
3. Bonzo Malekro (1 875)
4. Bounda (1 031)
5. Essan-Kouakoukro (1 161)
6. Gbanan-N'gattakro (853)
7. Lengbe-Kouassiblekro (894)
8. Kouassi-Kouassikro (7 793)
9. Akanza Kouadiokro (653)
10. Akotiakro (921)
11. Akpatoufoue (720)
12. Assekro (524)
13. Boua Kouadiokro (722)
14. Kissie-Manlekro (810)
15. Kouadio-N'drikro (723)
16. Lengbe-Kouadiokro (696)
17. Nandekro (823)
18. Sagui-Konankro (462)
19. Sahaguikro (1 235)
