= Bodokro =

- Town, sub-prefecture, and commune
- Location in Ivory Coast
- Coordinates: 7°52′N 5°28′W
- Country: Ivory Coast
- District: Vallée du Bandama
- Region: Gbêkê
- Department: Béoumi

Population (2014)
  - Total: 28,502
- Time zone: UTC+0 (GMT)

Bodokro is a town in central Ivory Coast. It is a sub-prefecture and commune of Béoumi Department in Gbêkê Region, Vallée du Bandama District.

== Villages ==
The 48 villages of the sub-prefecture of Béoumi and their population in 2014 are:

1. Akadiafoué (1 167)
2. Aka-Yaokro (421)
3. Assengou (2 019)
4. Assenzé (1 130)
5. Béoumi (25 526)
6. Bélakro (1 388)
7. Diacohou (1 478)
8. Kongonoussou (2 102)
9. Kongossou (1 201)
10. Konsou (2 189)
11. N'dèbo (889)
12. N'dori-Sakassou (387)
13. N'gotran (513)
14. Niambrun (2 082)
15. N'zuéda (832)
16. Ouaouassi (519)
17. Ouaouassi-Démakro (450)
18. Solo (620)
19. Souafouè-Dan (836)
20. Souafouè-Kan (702)
21. Tiendébo (532)
22. Zédé-Kan (1 198)
23. Abayansi (402)
24. Abouakro (1 181)
25. Affotobo (1 978)
26. Assakra (1 281)
27. Assèkro (711)
28. Diéviessou (3 214)
29. Fari-M'babo (739)
30. Fitabro (1 417)
31. Golikro (2 308)
32. Kaabo (854)
33. Kongobo (1 667)
34. Koubébo-Dan (1 128)
35. Koumambo (567)
36. Mangré-Kan (265)
37. Monébo (406)
38. N'zoupri (401)
39. Ouaouassi-M'babo (1 008)
40. Ouengrè (102)
41. Sanhouty (951)
42. Saoulétié (681)
43. Yoboué-N'zué (1 027)
44. Zèdè-Bossi (668)
45. Zèdè-Dianhoun (366)
46. Zédé-Kpambassou (612)
47. Zédé-N'drébo (814)
48. Zédé-Tiesso (546)
