= Goulia =

- Town, sub-prefecture, and commune
- Location in Ivory Coast
- Coordinates: 10°1′N 7°12′W
- Country: Ivory Coast
- District: Denguélé
- Region: Folon
- Department: Kaniasso

Population (2014)
  - Total: 18,590
- Time zone: UTC+0 (GMT)

Goulia is a town in north-western Ivory Coast. It is a sub-prefecture and commune of Kaniasso Department in Folon Region, Denguélé District.

In 2014, the population of the sub-prefecture of Goulia was 18,590.

== Villages ==
The 18 villages of the sub-prefecture of Goulia and their population in 2014 are:

1. Goulia (3 125)
2. Kamélézo (412)
3. Kohoma (1 134)
4. M'béblala (679)
5. Niarala (970)
6. Samakona (538)
7. Bogodougou (334)
8. Koba (1 086)
9. Kouroulingué (1 289)
10. Linguékoro (250)
11. Manadoun (1 387)
12. Missila (128)
13. N'golondié (689)
14. Sangouani (549)
15. Sokouraba (1 199)
16. Tahara (3 642)
17. Tienni (649)
18. Touroudio (530)
