= Ayamé =

- Town, sub-prefecture, and commune
- Location in Ivory Coast
- Coordinates: 5°36′N 3°10′W
- Country: Ivory Coast
- District: Comoé
- Region: Sud-Comoé
- Department: Aboisso

Population (2014)
  - Total: 14,195
- Time zone: UTC+0 (GMT)

Ayamé is a town in south-eastern Ivory Coast, near the border of Ghana. It is a sub-prefecture and commune of Aboisso Department in Sud-Comoé Region, Comoé District. In 2014, the population of the sub-prefecture of Ayamé was 14,195.

== Villages ==
The eight villages of the sub-prefecture of Ayamé and their population in 2014 are:

1. Ayamé (8 601)
2. Diéviesso (924)
3. Akressi (2 645)
4. Amoakro (695)
5. Biaka (293)
6. Ebokoffikro (387)
7. Gnamienkro (325)
8. Koukourandoumi (325)
