= Djibrosso =

Djibrosso Djiboroso
- Town, sub-prefecture, and commune
- Location in Ivory Coast
- Coordinates: 8°46′N 7°0′W
- Country: Ivory Coast
- District: Woroba
- Region: Worodougou
- Department: Kani

Population (2014)
  - Total: 11,859
- Time zone: UTC+0 (GMT)

Djibrosso (also spelled Djiboroso) is a town in north-western Ivory Coast. It is a sub-prefecture and commune of Kani Department in Worodougou Region, Woroba District. In 2014, the population of the sub-prefecture of Djibrosso was 11,859.

== Villages ==
The twelve villages of the sub-prefecture of Djibrosso and their population in 2014 are:

1. Borobadougou (459)
2. Dabé (578)
3. Djibrosso (4 160)
4. Djorofa (712)
5. Koumbara (763)
6. Madji (1 344)
7. Métro (851)
8. Moritiédougou (336)
9. Moyako (1 355)
10. Séguédjan (470)
11. Souasso (343)
12. Toté (488)
