= Diabo =

- Town, sub-prefecture, and commune
- Location in Ivory Coast
- Coordinates: 7°47′N 5°11′W
- Country: Ivory Coast
- District: Vallée du Bandama
- Region: Gbêkê
- Department: Botro

Population (2014)
  - Total: 26,272
- Time zone: UTC+0 (GMT)

Diabo is a town in central Ivory Coast. It is a sub-prefecture and commune of Botro Department in Gbêkê Region, Vallée du Bandama District.

In 2014, the population of the sub-prefecture of Diabo was 26,272.

== Villages ==
The 27 villages of the sub-prefecture of Diabo and their population in 2014 are:

1. Adjékro (1 613)
2. Agbakro (1 386)
3. Akokokro (228)
4. Diabo (8 522)
5. Djaha Andokro (227)
6. Groh (511)
7. Kitipo (165)
8. Kokokro (171)
9. Konan Kpinkro (224)
10. Kondoubo (810)
11. Kouassi Golikro (550)
12. Langbo (332)
13. Messoukro (322)
14. Adjonou (200)
15. Assekro (426)
16. Konanblékro (664)
17. Langama (1 016)
18. N'gatta Koffikro (1 238)
19. N'gattakro (348)
20. N'guessan Kouamékro (201)
21. Sélakro (517)
22. Sinzékro (1 052)
23. Soussoubo (413)
24. Télébokan (1 038)
25. Télébokpli (1 257)
26. Tikakro (1 401)
27. Yomien-Kouadiokro (1 440)
