= Karakoro, Ivory Coast =

Karakoro
- Town, sub-prefecture, and commune
- Location in Ivory Coast
- Coordinates: 9°25′N 5°30′W
- Country: Ivory Coast
- District: Savanes
- Region: Poro
- Department: Korhogo

Population (2014)
  - Total: 19,243
- Time zone: UTC+0 (GMT)

Karakoro is a town in northern Ivory Coast. It is a sub-prefecture and commune of Korhogo Department in Poro Region, Savanes District.

In 2014, the population of the sub-prefecture of Karakoro was 19,243.

== Villages ==
The 74 villages of the sub-prefecture of Karakoro and their population in 2014 are:

1. Dielokaha (145)
2. Dolekaha (126)
3. Feleguessankaha (85)
4. Gnelokaha (200)
5. Kanoukaha (100)
6. Karakoro (1 238)
7. Kolekaha (32)
8. Kolgotonkaha (101)
9. Kouniguekaha (388)
10. Koutiokaha (152)
11. Kpombelekaha (203)
12. Labitienkaha (43)
13. Ladorikaha (127)
14. Lagneniguekaha (105)
15. Lavononkaha (352)
16. Loyerikaha (865)
17. Morovine (325)
18. Nogomononkaha (100)
19. Oliokaha (543)
20. Pangarikaha (1 552)
21. Pokaha (1 722)
22. Sambalakaha (191)
23. Tahouelekaha (140)
24. Tianankaha (273)
25. Topinakaha (200)
26. Bekaha (168)
27. Blagbokaha (389)
28. Dierissonkaha (952)
29. Djangalakaha (81)
30. Djatoukaha (208)
31. Djelikaha (193)
32. Domikaha (62)
33. Fanzeguekaha (65)
34. Felekaha (373)
35. Fonvonkaha (120)
36. Gnangakaha (277)
37. Gneguidiokaha (137)
38. Houologokaha (47)
39. Kakobinkaha (149)
40. Korgokaha (230)
41. Lagakaha (190)
42. Lahouolokaha 2 (453)
43. Latienekaha (346)
44. Lotounkaha (178)
45. Nabekaha (29)
46. Nadogokaha (148)
47. Nahouokaha 1 (655)
48. Nahouokaha 2 (321)
49. Nakpokaha (131)
50. Nalolokaha / Ninlolokaha (41)
51. Nambekaha (72)
52. Nambodielekaha (163)
53. Nandanakaha (231)
54. Nandjounkaha (109)
55. Nangounkaha (138)
56. Naviguekaha (203)
57. Navolokaha (27)
58. Nogobankaha 1 (200)
59. Nogossankaha (28)
60. Nogotanakaha (266)
61. Nongosorikaha (188)
62. Ottokaha (169)
63. Penatarikaha (104)
64. Penefirguekaha (113)
65. Petokaha (137)
66. Pinsorikaha (57)
67. Sekonkaha (167)
68. Setiokaha (156)
69. Tagbonkaha (189)
70. Tarikaha (195)
71. Tegnonkaha (94)
72. Tielokaha (188)
73. Toulekaha (353)
74. Zouanekaha (445)
