= Tafiré =

- Town, sub-prefecture, and commune
- Location in Ivory Coast
- Coordinates: 9°4′N 5°10′W
- Country: Ivory Coast
- District: Vallée du Bandama
- Region: Hambol
- Department: Niakaramandougou

Area
  - Total: 1,310 km^{2} (510 sq mi)

Population (2021 census)
  - Total: 32,240
  - Density: 24.6/km^{2} (63.7/sq mi)
  - Town: 17,191
- (2014 census)
- Time zone: UTC+0 (GMT)

Tafiré is a town in northern Ivory Coast. It is a sub-prefecture and commune of Niakaramandougou Department in Hambol Region, Vallée du Bandama District.

== Villages ==
The 8 villages of the sub-prefecture of Tafiré and their population in 2014 are

1. Koulokakaha (153)
2. N'golodougou (1 828)
3. Tafiré (17 191)
4. Tiélétanakaha (187)
5. Korlokaha (533)
6. Ségbélékaha (94)
7. Sélilékaha (2 123)
8. Takpalakaha (1 256)

== Notes ==
In 2014, the population of the sub-prefecture of Tafiré was 23,365.
