= Kouassi-Kouassikro Department =

Coordinates: 7°1′N 4°43′W

Kouassi-Kouassikro Department Département de Kouassi-Kouassikro
- Department
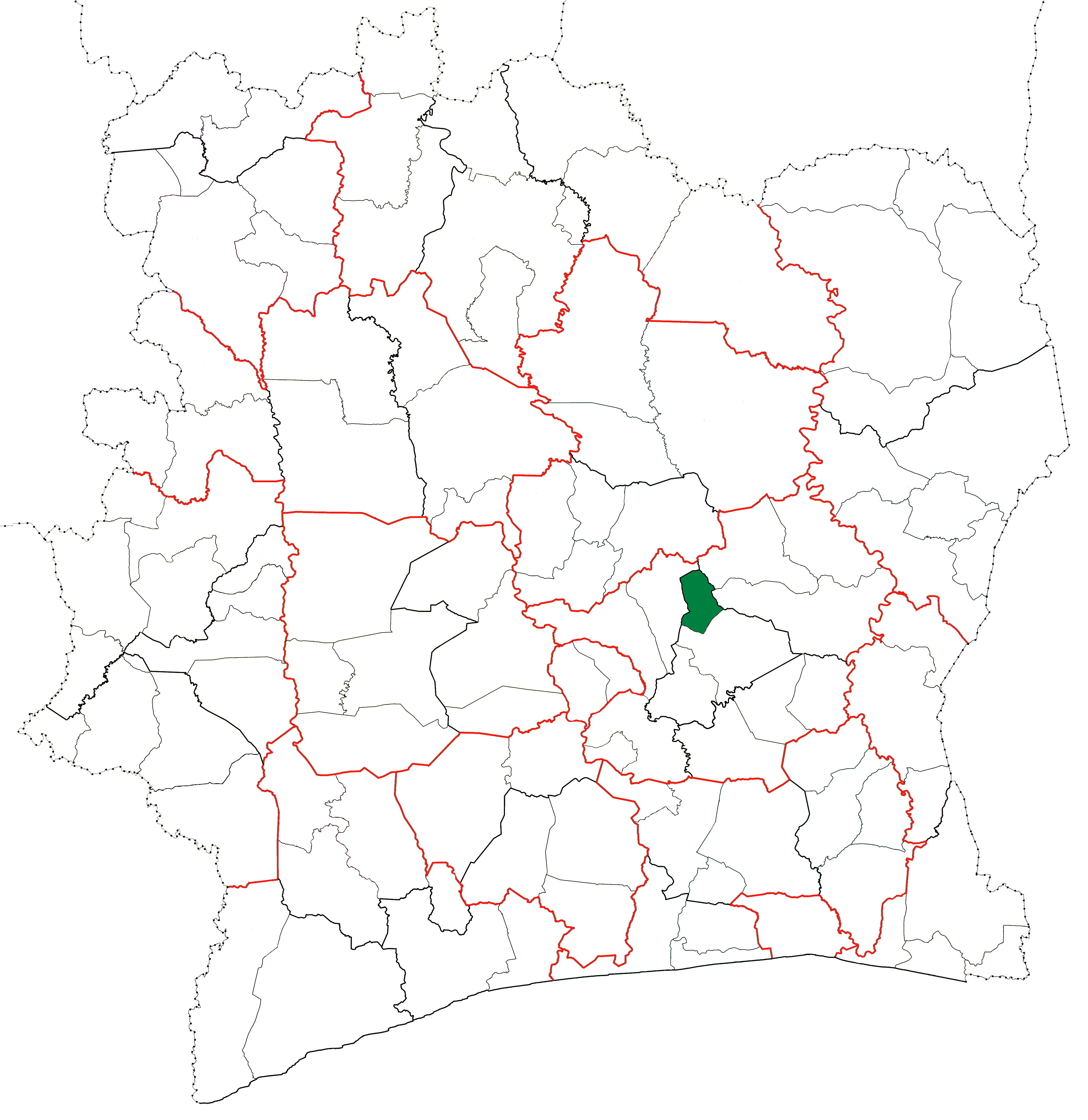
- Location in Ivory Coast. Kouassi-Kouassikro Department has retained the same boundaries since its creation in 2012.
- Country: Ivory Coast
- District: Lacs
- Region: N'Zi
- 2012: Established via a division of Bocanda Dept
- Departmental seat: Kouassi-Kouassikro

Government
  - Prefect: Germain N'Guessan Kouakou

Area
  - Total: 697 km^{2} (269 sq mi)

Population (2021 census)
  - Total: 30,962
  - Density: 44.4/km^{2} (115/sq mi)
- Time zone: UTC+0 (GMT)

Kouassi-Kouassikro Department is a department of N'Zi Region in Lacs District, Ivory Coast. In 2021, its population was 30,962 and its seat is the settlement of Kouassi-Kouassikro. The sub-prefectures of the department are Kouassi-Kouassikro and Mékro.

== History ==
Kouassi-Kouassikro Department was created in 2012 by dividing Bocanda Department.
