= Niofoin =

- Town, sub-prefecture, and commune
- Location in Ivory Coast
- Coordinates: 9°37′N 6°5′W
- Country: Ivory Coast
- District: Savanes
- Region: Poro
- Department: Korhogo

Population (2014)
  - Total: 26,471
- Time zone: UTC+0 (GMT)

Niofoin is a town in northern Ivory Coast. It is a sub-prefecture and commune of Korhogo Department in Poro Region, Savanes District.

In 2014, the population of the sub-prefecture of Niofoin was 26,471.

== Villages ==
The 25 villages of the sub-prefecture of Niofoin and their population in 2014 are:

1. Badon (1 085)
2. Djougouble (4 602)
3. Kamanhan (244)
4. Niofoin (867)
5. Kamara (618)
6. Kanihoua (118)
7. Kombolokoro (853)
8. Loukpan (332)
9. Mamougou (2 051)
10. Mara (363)
11. M'bia (1 022)
12. Ogari (1 230)
13. Ouayeri (1 262)
14. Ouayeri-Djelisso (951)
15. Pitiengomon (376)
16. Pivonhon (2 538)
17. Seguetiele (604)
18. Seyelihouo (2 095)
19. Somon (740)
20. Talapin (514)
21. Tangafla (463)
22. Tarato (1 673)
23. Tolman (952)
24. Venisiguevogo (709)
25. Yoro (209)
