= Tiémé =

- Town, sub-prefecture, and commune
- Location in Ivory Coast
- Coordinates: 9°32′N 7°20′W
- Country: Ivory Coast
- District: Denguélé
- Region: Kabadougou
- Department: Odienné

Population (2014)
  - Total: 9,182
- Time zone: UTC+0 (GMT)

Tiémé is a town in northwestern Ivory Coast. It is a sub-prefecture and commune of Odienné Department in Kabadougou Region, Denguélé District. It is situated between two major towns of the Denguélé: Odienné is located approximately 20 kilometres (12 mi) west, and Madinani lies 28 kilometres (17 mi) east.

The French explorer René Caillié arrived in Tiémé on 3 August 1827, on the long journey that would take him to Timbuktu. Ill with malaria, scurvy and with a tropical ulcer on his foot, he was forced to remain for five months in the village. He gave a detailed account of his stay in his book Travels through Central Africa to Timbuctoo, which was published in 1830. He spelled the name of the village as Timé. He set out for Djenné on 9 January 1828 and joined a large caravan carrying kola nuts.

In 2014, the population of the sub-prefecture of Tiémé was 9,182.

== Villages ==
The four villages of the sub-prefecture of Tiémé and their population in 2014 are:

1. N'doniégué (760)
2. Tahanso (1,060)
3. Tiémé (6,267)
4. Zégbao (1,095)
