= Hiré =

- Town, sub-prefecture, and commune
- Location in Ivory Coast
- Coordinates: 6°11′N 5°17′W
- Country: Ivory Coast
- District: Gôh-Djiboua
- Region: Lôh-Djiboua
- Department: Divo

Area
  - Total: 433 km^{2} (167 sq mi)

Population (2021 census)
  - Total: 78,139
  - Density: 180/km^{2} (467/sq mi)
  - Town: 31,960
- (2014 census)
- Time zone: UTC+0 (GMT)

Hiré is a town in southern Ivory Coast. It is a sub-prefecture and commune of Divo Department in Lôh-Djiboua Region, Gôh-Djiboua District.

In 2021, the population of the sub-prefecture of Hiré was 78,139.

== Villages ==
The 6 villages of the sub-prefecture of Hiré and their population in 2014 are:

1. Bouakako (1 233)
2. Douaville (2 780)
3. Gogobro (4 355)
4. Hiré (31 960)
5. Kagbé (8 560)
6. Zaroko (1 469)
