= Bin-Houyé =

- Town, sub-prefecture, and commune
- Location in Ivory Coast
- Coordinates: 6°47′N 8°19′W
- Country: Ivory Coast
- District: Montagnes
- Region: Tonkpi
- Department: Zouan-Hounien

Population (2014)
  - Total: 28,499
- Time zone: UTC+0 (GMT)

Bin-Houyé is a town in the far west of Ivory Coast. It is a sub-prefecture and commune of Zouan-Hounien Department in Tonkpi Region, Montagnes District. A border crossing with Liberia is three kilometres to the northwest.

In 2014, the population of the sub-prefecture of Bin-Houyé was 28,499.

== Villages ==
The twenty two villages of the sub-prefecture of Bin-Houyé and their population in 2014 are:

1. Bayouopleu (391)
2. Bin-Houyé (7 621)
3. Diéipleu (554)
4. Diepleu (732)
5. Dohouba (1 137)
6. Fapleu (1 137)
7. Gan-Houyé (1 240)
8. Gatouo 1 (845)
9. Gatouo 2 (723)
10. Gontépleu (1 169)
11. Gueiossiépleu (1 768)
12. Gueu-Houyé (996)
13. Guizreu 2 (500)
14. Katouo (1 266)
15. Médipleu (1 000)
16. Souapleu 2 (749)
17. Vapleu (888)
18. Yaglogleu (717)
19. Yagotouo (1 821)
20. Youampleu (1 721)
21. Zogleu (553)
22. Zoleu (971)
