= Seydougou =

- Town, sub-prefecture, and commune
- Location in Ivory Coast
- Coordinates: 9°31′N 7°59′W
- Country: Ivory Coast
- District: Denguélé
- Region: Kabadougou
- Department: Gbéléban

Population (2014)
  - Total: 4,397
- Time zone: UTC+0 (GMT)

Seydougou is a town in northwestern Ivory Coast. It is a sub-prefecture and commune of Gbéléban Department in Kabadougou Region, Denguélé District, adjacent to the border with Ivory Coast.

In 2014, the population of the sub-prefecture of Seydougou was 4,397.

== Villages ==
The 7 villages of the sub-prefecture of Seydougou and their population in 2014 are:

1. Badouala (360)
2. Balala (604)
3. Gbessasso (645)
4. Kabala (391)
5. Kohouéna (489)
6. Sandjougouna (395)
7. Seydougou (1 513)
