= Koonan =

- Town, sub-prefecture, and commune
- Location in Ivory Coast
- Coordinates: 8°24′N 8°5′W
- Country: Ivory Coast
- District: Woroba
- Region: Bafing
- Department: Ouaninou

Population (2014)
  - Total: 6,553
- Time zone: UTC+0 (GMT)

Koonan is a town in the far west of Ivory Coast. It is a sub-prefecture and commune of Ouaninou Department in Bafing Region, Woroba District. In 2014, the population of the sub-prefecture of Koonan was 6,553.

== Villages ==
The fifteen villages of the sub-prefecture of Koonan and their population in 2014 are:

1. Bayola (294)
2. Koonan (935)
3. Monzonan (313)
4. Soula (1 261)
5. Vassamadougou (206)
6. Fouana (103)
7. Golla (190)
8. Lassebadougou (168)
9. Massédougou (477)
10. Missadougou (175)
11. Sékodougou (338)
12. Sialou (141)
13. Ténémassa (1 488)
14. Togbadougou (160)
15. Yaffè (304)
