= Morondo =

- Town, sub-prefecture, and commune
- Location in Ivory Coast
- Coordinates: 8°57′N 6°47′W
- Country: Ivory Coast
- District: Woroba
- Region: Worodougou
- Department: Kani

Population (2014)
  - Total: 15,753
- Time zone: UTC+0 (GMT)

Morondo is a town in north-western Ivory Coast. It is a sub-prefecture and commune of Kani Department in Worodougou Region, Woroba District. In 2014, the population of the sub-prefecture of Morondo was 15,753.

== Villages ==
The nine villages of the sub-prefecture of Morondo and their population in 2014 are:

1. Fingolo (1 403)
2. Kokodjimono (162)
3. Morondo (3 839)
4. Séfrédjo (1 155)
5. Diomandougou (2 040)
6. Hermankono (1 197)
7. Kologo (2 611)
8. Notou (2 587)
9. Sétoumou (759)
