= Rubino, Ivory Coast =

Rubino
- Town, sub-prefecture, and commune
- Location in Ivory Coast
- Coordinates: 6°4′N 4°19′W
- Country: Ivory Coast
- District: Lagunes
- Region: Agnéby-Tiassa
- Department: Agboville

Area
  - Total: 506 km^{2} (195 sq mi)

Population (2021 census)
  - Total: 32,775
  - Density: 64.8/km^{2} (168/sq mi)
  - Town: 14,025
- (2014 census)
- Time zone: UTC+0 (GMT)

Rubino is a town in southeastern Ivory Coast. It is a sub-prefecture and commune of Agboville Department in Agnéby-Tiassa Region, Lagunes District.

In 2021, the population of the sub-prefecture of Rubino was 32,775.

== Villages ==
The 12 villages of the sub-prefecture of Rubino and their population in 2014 are:

1. Adomokro (1 850)
2. Dey-Oboguié (920)
3. Kamabrou (797)
4. Rubino (14 025)
5. Ségbévi (573)
6. Allany (4 575)
7. Amangbeu (4 322)
8. Brou-M'po (786)
9. Gouabo (2 224)
10. Kédjé-M'po (730)
11. Kotchi-M'po (2 910)
12. Ouélézoué (1 841)
