= Borotou =

- Town, sub-prefecture, and commune
- Location in Ivory Coast
- Coordinates: 8°44′N 7°30′W
- Country: Ivory Coast
- District: Woroba
- Region: Bafing
- Department: Koro

Population (2014)
  - Total: 5,353
- Time zone: UTC+0 (GMT)

Borotou is a town in northwest Ivory Coast. It is a sub-prefecture and commune of Koro Department in Bafing Region, Woroba District.

In 2014, the population of the sub-prefecture of Borotou was 5,353.

== Villages ==
The nine villages of the sub-prefecture of Borotou and their population in 2014 are:

1. Borotou (2 203)
2. Ouassiko (28)
3. Sekodougou (124)
4. Bambadougou (839)
5. Bilalo (278)
6. Moyendougou (135)
7. Niamoutou (987)
8. Tiékoronidougou (433)
9. Zoumassadougou (326)
