= Afféry =

Afféry Aféri
- Town, sub-prefecture, and commune
- Location in Ivory Coast
- Coordinates: 6°19′N 3°58′W
- Country: Ivory Coast
- District: Lagunes
- Region: La Mé
- Department: Akoupé

Area
  - Total: 650 km^{2} (250 sq mi)

Population (2021 census)
  - Total: 47,109
  - Density: 72/km^{2} (190/sq mi)
  - Town: 21,777
- (2014 census)
- Time zone: UTC+0 (GMT)

Afféry (also spelled Aféri) is a town in south-eastern Ivory Coast. It is a sub-prefecture of Akoupé Department in La Mé Region, Lagunes District. Afféry is also a commune.
