= Zikisso =

- Town, sub-prefecture, and commune
- Location in Ivory Coast
- Coordinates: 6°6′N 5°41′W
- Country: Ivory Coast
- District: Gôh-Djiboua
- Region: Lôh-Djiboua
- Department: Lakota

Population (2014)
  - Total: 9,698
- Time zone: UTC+0 (GMT)

Zikisso is a town in southern Ivory Coast. It is a sub-prefecture and commune of Lakota Department in Lôh-Djiboua Region, Gôh-Djiboua District.

In 2014, the population of the sub-prefecture of Zikisso was 9,698.

== Villages ==
The 5 villages of the sub-prefecture of Zikisso and their population in 2014 are:

1. Bogoboua (2,353)
2. Gogohouri (363)
3. Makobéri (1,205)
4. Niagbaméko (538)
5. Zikisso (5,239)
