= Sinématiali Department =

Coordinates: 9°35′N 5°23′W

Sinématiali Department Département de Sinématiali
- Department
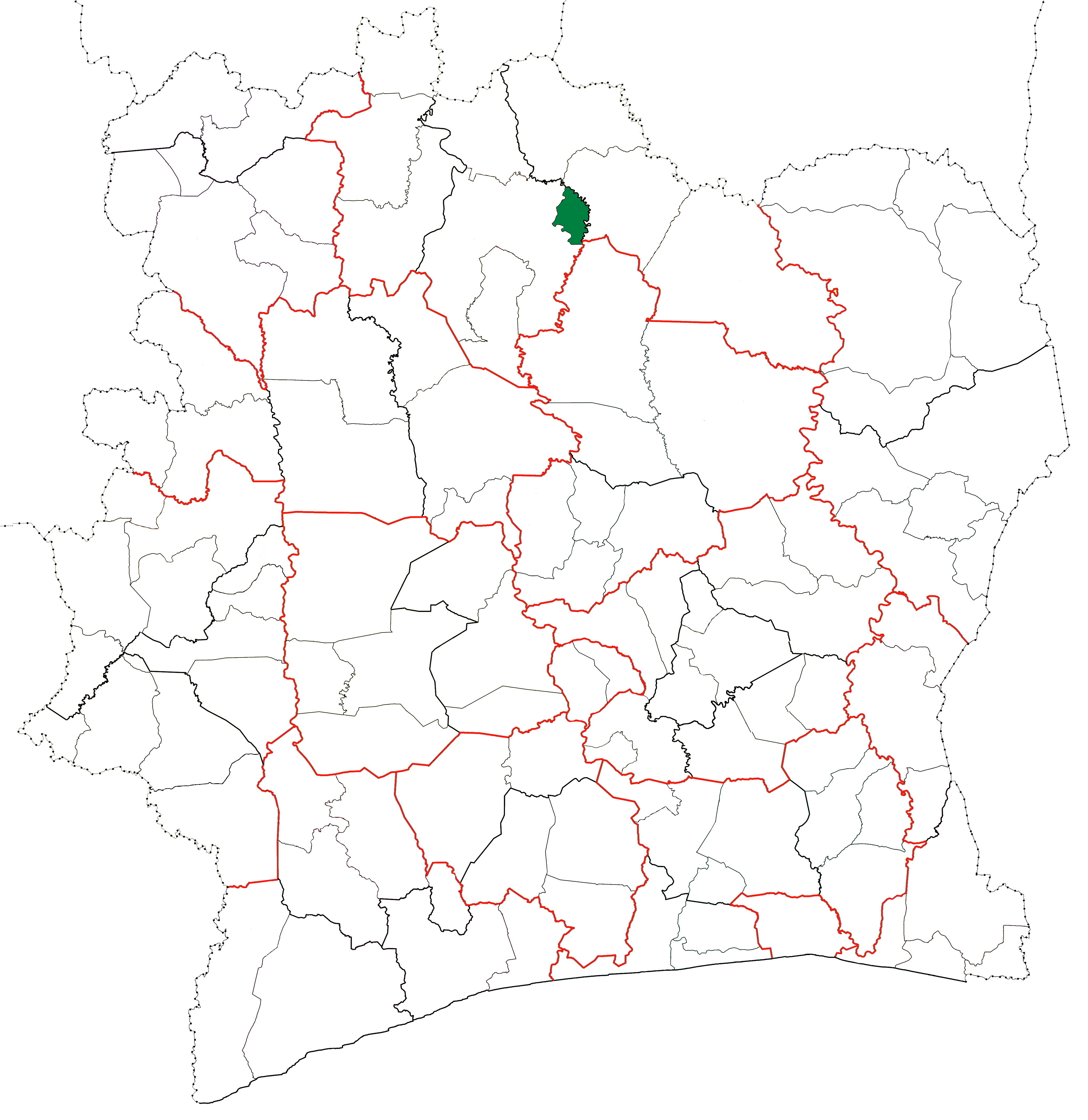
- Location in Ivory Coast. Sinématiali Department has retained the same boundaries since its creation in 2008.
- Country: Ivory Coast
- District: Savanes
- Region: Poro
- 2008: Established as a second-level subdivision via a division of Korhogo Dept
- 2011: Converted to a third-level subdivision
- Departmental seat: Sinématiali

Government
  - Prefect: Namory Doumbia

Area
  - Total: 516 km^{2} (199 sq mi)

Population (2021 census)
  - Total: 74,981
  - Density: 145/km^{2} (376/sq mi)
- Time zone: UTC+0 (GMT)

Sinématiali Department is a department of Poro Region in Savanes District, Ivory Coast. In 2021, its population was 74,981 and its seat is the settlement of Sinématiali. The sub-prefectures of the department are Bouakaha, Kagbolodougou, Sédiogo, and Sinématiali.

== History ==
Sinématiali Department was created in 2008 as second-level subdivision via a split-off from Korhogo Department. At its creation, it was part of Savanes Region.

In 2011, districts were introduced as new first-level subdivisions of Ivory Coast. At the same time, regions were reorganised and became second-level subdivisions and all departments were converted into third-level subdivisions. At this time, Sinématiali Department became part of Poro Region in Savanes District.
