= Savanes Region (Ivory Coast) =

Subdivision of Ivory Coast (1997–2011)

Coordinates: 9°30′N 5°30′W

Savanes Region Région des Savanes
- Defunct region of Ivory Coast
- 1997–2011
- Location of Savanes Region in Ivory Coast
- Capital: Korhogo
- Area
- 40,210 km^{2} (15,530 sq mi)
- History
  - Established as a first-level subdivision: 1997
  - Disestablished: 2011
- Today part of: Savanes District

Savanes Region is a defunct region of Ivory Coast. From 1997 to 2011, it was a first-level subdivision region. The region's capital was Korhogo and its area was 40,210 km^{2}. Since 2011, the area formerly encompassed by the region is co-extensive with Savanes District.

== Administrative divisions ==
At the time of its dissolution, Savanes Region was divided into seven departments: Boundiali, Ferkessédougou, Korhogo, Kouto, Ouangolodougou, Sinématiali, and Tengréla.

== Abolition ==
Savanes Region was abolished as part of the 2011 administrative reorganisation of the subdivisions of Ivory Coast. The area formerly encompassed by the region is now the same territory as Savanes District.
