= Assuéfry =

Assuéfry Assuéffry
- Town, sub-prefecture, and commune
- Location in Ivory Coast
- Coordinates: 7°42′N 2°59′W
- Country: Ivory Coast
- District: Zanzan
- Region: Gontougo
- Department: Tanda

Population (2014)
  - Total: 30,406
- Time zone: UTC+0 (GMT)

Assuéfry (also spelled Assuéffry) is a town in the far east of Ivory Coast. It is a sub-prefecture of Transua Department in Gontougo Region, Zanzan District. Assuéfry is also a commune.

In 2014, the population of the sub-prefecture of Assuéfry was 30,406.

== Villages ==
The twenty seven villages of the sub-prefecture of Assuéfry and their population in 2014 are:

1. Abokro (394)
2. Adandia (1 705)
3. Adiamara (564)
4. Adiopènan (174)
5. Amonkobénankro (793)
6. Assuamakro (212)
7. Assuéfry (9 759)
8. Bouakro (130)
9. Datékro (469)
10. Hiango (1 306)
11. Kassabi (298)
12. Kékréni (1 787)
13. Kotokuini (214)
14. Kouam-Dari (491)
15. Kouassi-Séranou (1 241)
16. Mantoukoua (1 003)
17. Mérékou (1 107)
18. N'gam (1 008)
19. Siédja (1 000)
20. Yomankro (1 334)
21. Batoutié Foumassa (229)
22. Bossomkuikro (1 233)
23. Dadiassé (1 414)
24. Kotokoua (144)
25. Yakassé-Akidom (927)
26. Yao Dongokro (375)
27. Yomian (1 095)
