= Dualla, Ivory Coast =

Dualla Dwalla
- Town, sub-prefecture, and commune
- Location in Ivory Coast
- Coordinates: 8°8′N 6°33′W
- Country: Ivory Coast
- District: Woroba
- Region: Worodougou
- Department: Séguéla

Population (2014)
  - Total: 8,130
- Time zone: UTC+0 (GMT)

Dualla (also spelled Dwalla) is a town in north-western Ivory Coast. It is a sub-prefecture and commune of Séguéla Department in Worodougou Region, Woroba District.

In 2014, the population of the sub-prefecture of Dualla was 8,130.

== Villages ==
The fourteen villages of the sub-prefecture of Dualla and their population in 2014 are:

1. Dona (418)
2. Dualla (1 915)
3. Linguékoro (436)
4. Sagbakoro (246)
5. Sandala (734)
6. Sokoura (415)
7. Kahama (155)
8. Nandala (579)
9. Ranch De La Marahoué (445)
10. Siana (1 110)
11. Somana (640)
12. Suinla-Brogbéna (547)
13. Suinvilla 1 (674)
14. Suinvilla 2 (268)
