= Korhogo Department =

Coordinates: 9°25′N 5°37′W

Korhogo Department Département de Korhogo
- Department
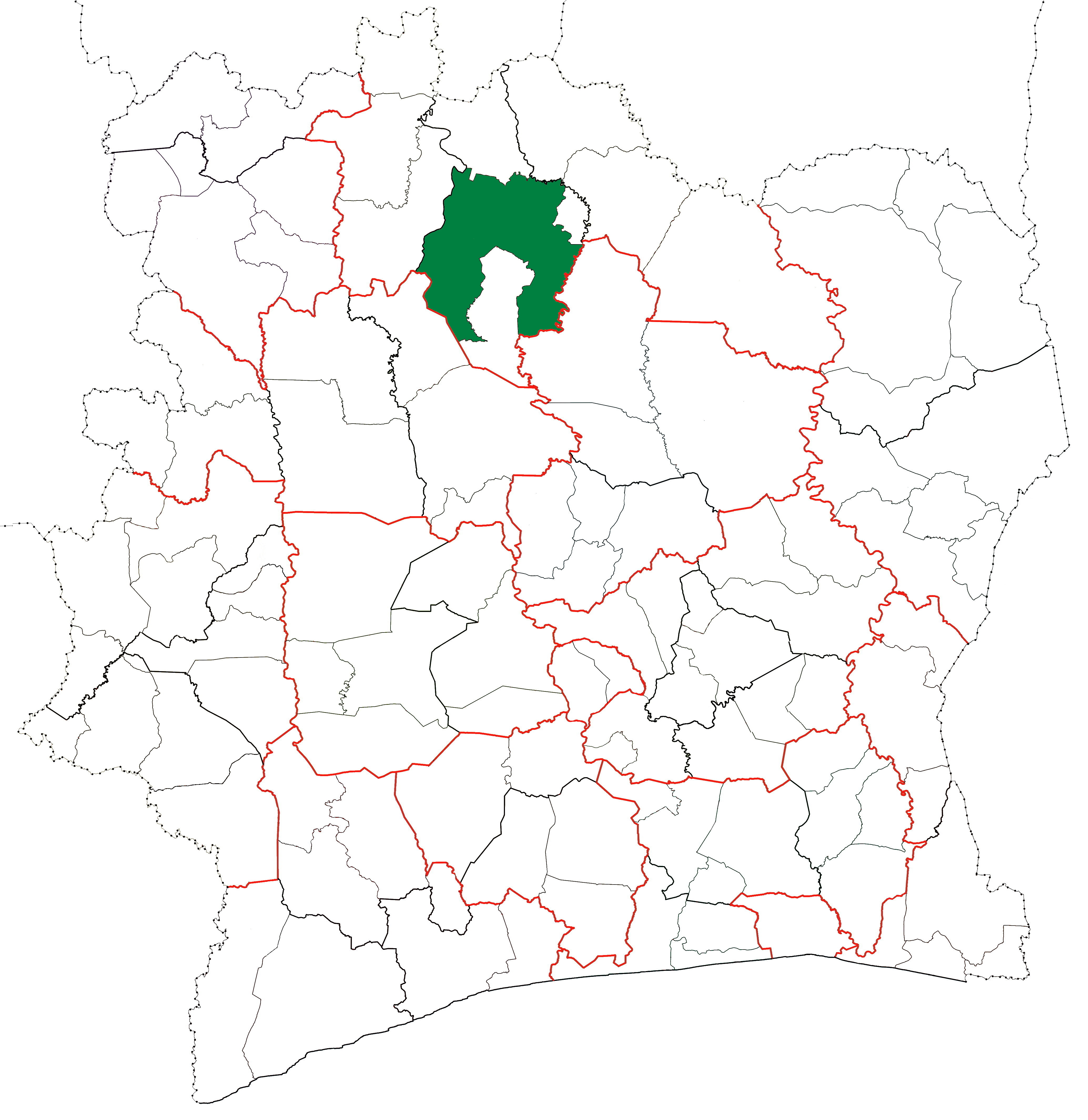
- Location in Ivory Coast. Korhogo Department has had these boundaries since 2012.
- Country: Ivory Coast
- District: Savanes
- Region: Poro
- 1969: Established as a first-level subdivision
- 1997: Converted to a second-level subdivision
- 2008: Divided to create Sinématiali Dept
- 2011: Converted to a third-level subdivision
- 2011: Divided to create Dikodougou Dept
- 2012: Divided to create M'Bengué Dept
- Departmental seat: Korhogo

Government
  - Prefect: Daouda Outtara

Area
  - Total: 6,880 km^{2} (2,660 sq mi)

Population (2021 census)
  - Total: 748,393
  - Density: 109/km^{2} (282/sq mi)
- Time zone: UTC+0 (GMT)

Korhogo Department is a department of the Poro Region in Savanes District, Ivory Coast. In 2021, its population was 748,393 and its seat is the settlement of Korhogo. The sub-prefectures of the department are Dassoungboho, Kanoroba, Karakoro, Kiémou, Kombolokoura, Komborodougou, Koni, Korhogo, Lataha, Nafoun, Napiéolédougou, N'Ganon, Niofoin, Sirasso, Sohouo, and Tioroniaradougou.

== History ==
Korhogo Department was created in 1969 as one of the 24 new departments that were created to take the place of the six departments that were being abolished. It was created from territory that was formerly part of the Nord Department. Using current boundaries as a reference, from 1969 to 2008 the department occupied the same territory as Poro Region.

In 1997, regions were introduced as new first-level subdivisions of Ivory Coast; as a result, all departments were converted into second-level subdivisions. Korhogo Department was included as part of Savanes Region.

Korhogo Department was divided in 2008 to create Sinématiali Department and in 2011 to create Dikodougou Department.

In 2011, districts were introduced as new first-level subdivisions of Ivory Coast. At the same time, regions were reorganised and became second-level subdivisions and all departments were converted into third-level subdivisions. At this time, Korhogo Department became part of Poro Region in Savanes District.

Korhogo Department was divided a third time in 2012, when four sub-prefectures were split-off to create M'Bengué Department.

=== Maps of historical boundaries ===
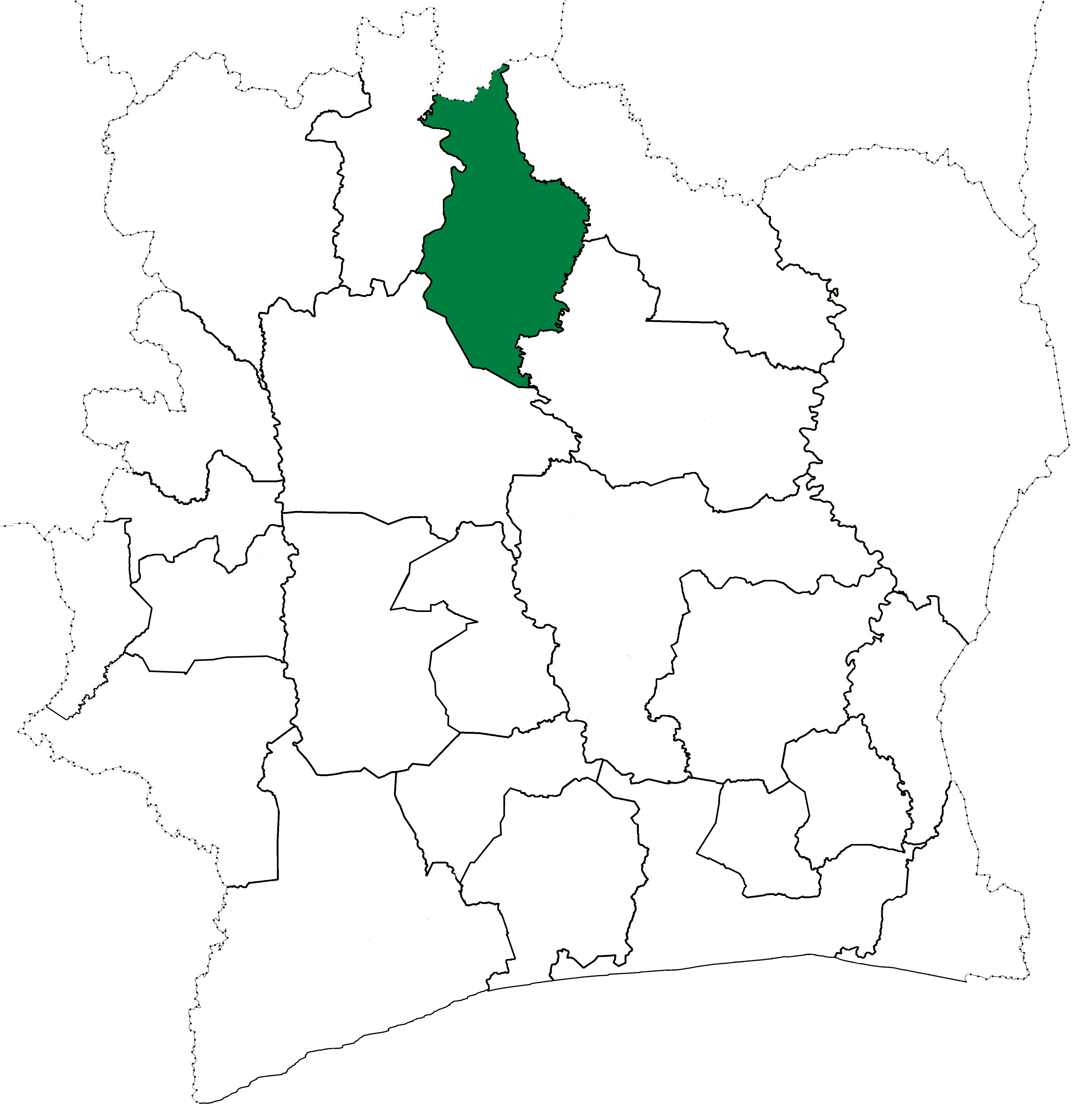
Korhogo Department upon its creation in 1969. It kept these boundaries until 2008, but other departments began to be divided in 1974.

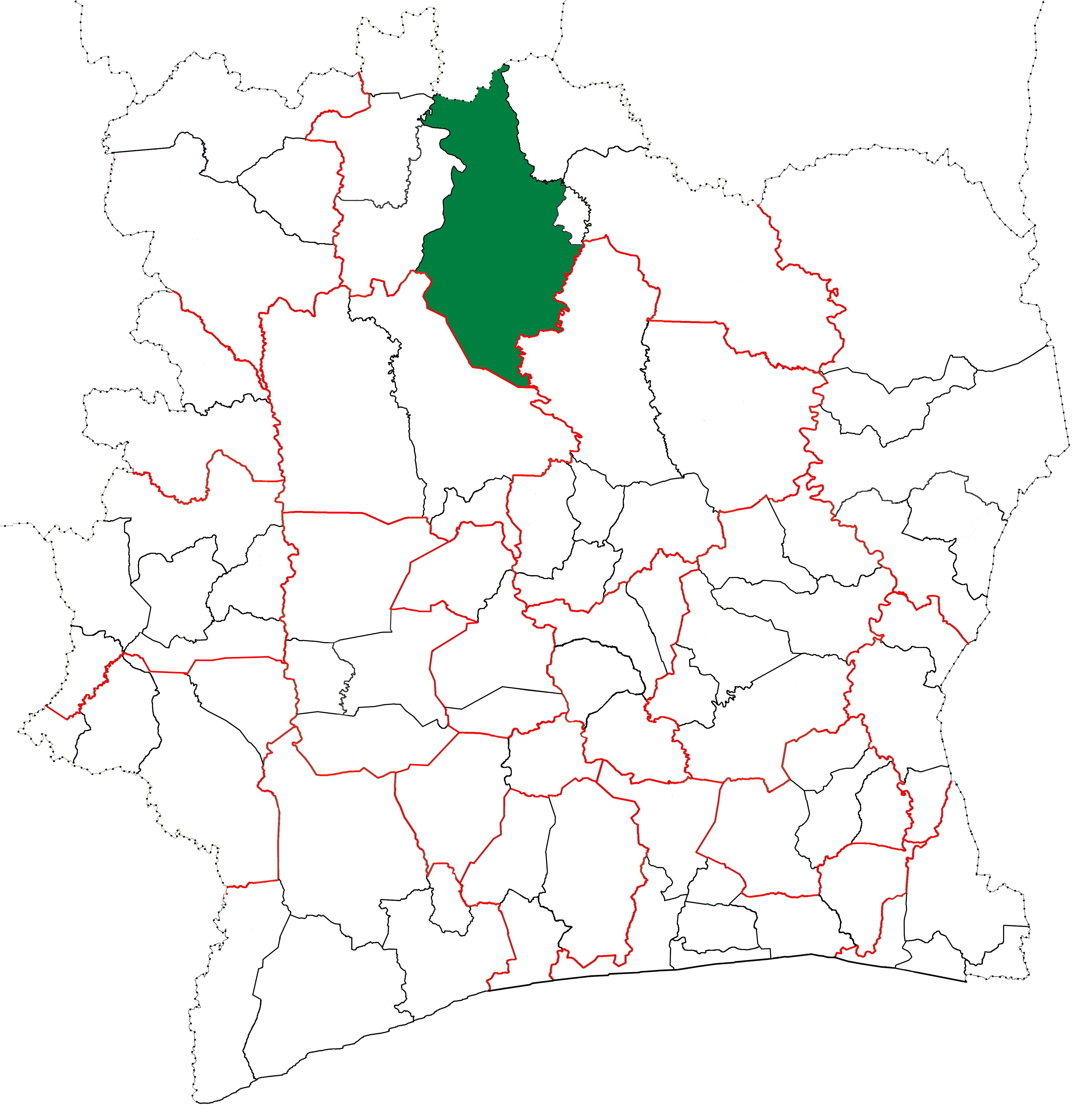
Korhogo Department from 2008 to 2011. (Other subdivision boundaries began to change in 2009.)

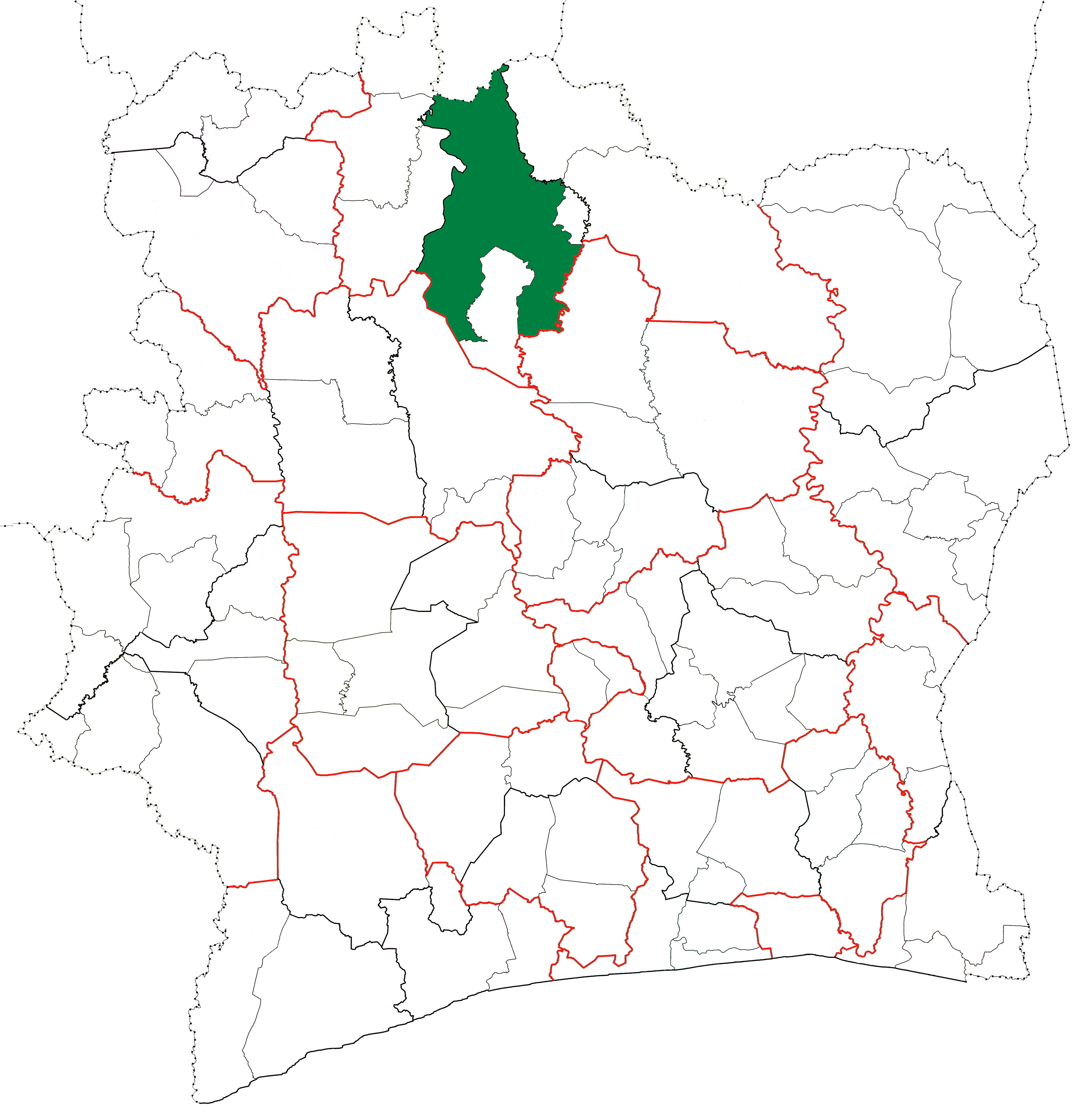
Korhogo Department from 2011 to 2012.
