= Sub-prefectures of Ivory Coast =

Fourth-level administrative subdivisions of the country

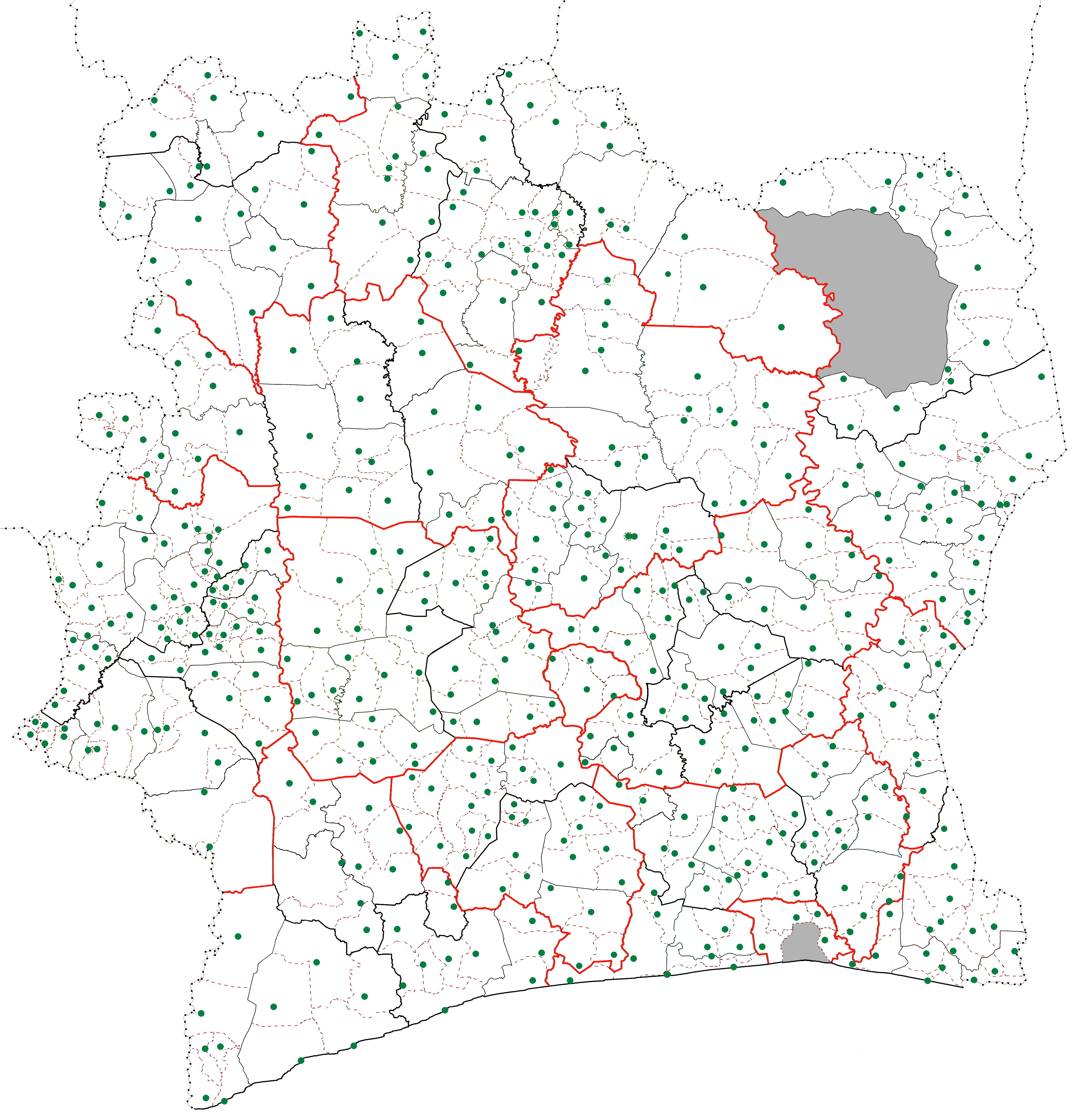
Sub-prefectures of Ivory Coast. The sub-prefecture boundaries are dotted lines. The green dots indicate the location of the settlement that is the seat of each sub-prefecture. The grey zones are areas of the country not governed by sub-prefectures.

Sub-prefectures of Ivory Coast (French: sous-préfectures de Côte d'Ivoire) are the fourth-level administrative subdivisions of the country. There are currently 510 sub-prefectures. They were created in 2011, when the administrative subdivisions of Ivory Coast were reorganised.

In Ivory Coast, there are 14 first-level districts (including two autonomous districts) sub-divided into 31 regions, which are sub-divided into 108 departments (French: départements), which are further sub-divided into 510 sub-prefectures. The sub-prefectures contain more than 8000 villages nationwide. Where needed, multiple villages have been combined into 197 communes. The two autonomous districts are not divided into regions, but they do contain one or more departments as well as sub-prefectures and communes.

Two areas of the country are not subdivided into sub-prefectures. First, the urban portion the Autonomous District of Abidjan—constituting Abidjan City proper—contains no sub-prefectures, only communes, although the more rural areas of the Autonomous District of Abidjan are divided into sub-prefectures. Second, the portion of the Comoé National Park that is located in Zanzan District is not divided into sub-prefectures.

== Organisation ==
Each sub-prefecture is headed by a sub-prefect, who is appointed by the council of ministers (cabinet) of the national government. The sub-prefecture implements the programmes passed down by the department and works directly with the mayors and heads of villages to ensure cooperation and standardisation throughout the sub-prefecture.

== Sub-prefectures by district, region and department ==
Below is a list of sub-prefectures organized by district, region and department. Population figures in parentheses are based on the 2014 RGPH census.

=== Abidjan Autonomous District ===
- (population: 4,707,404)

==== Urban Abidjan ====
- (population: 4,395,243)
  - North Abidjan (population: 3,190,633)
  1. Abobo^{*} (population: 1,030,658)
  2. Adjamé^{*} (population: 372,978)
  3. Attécoubé^{*} (population: 260,911)
  4. Cocody^{*} (population: 447,055)
  5. Plateau^{*} (population: 7,488)
  6. Yopougon^{*} (population: 1,071,543)
  - South Abidjan (population: 1,204,610)
  1. Koumassi^{*} (population: 433,139)
  2. Marcory^{*} (population: 249,858)
  3. Port-Bouët^{*} (population: 419,033)
  4. Treichville^{*} (population: 102,580)

==== Rural Abidjan ====
- (population: 312,161)
  - East Rural Abidjan (population: 107,161)
  1. Bingerville (population: 91,319)
  2. Brofodoumé (population: 15,842)
  - West Rural Abidjan (population: 205,000)
  1. Anyama (population: 148,962)
  2. Songon (population: 56,038)

^{*} – communes, not sub-prefectures

=== Yamoussoukro Autonomous District ===
- (population: 355,573)
  - East Yamoussoukro (population: 45,517)
  1. Attiégouakro (population: 12,250)
  2. Lolobo (population: 33,267)
  - West Yamoussoukro (population: 310,056)
  1. Yamoussoukro (population: 281,735)
  2. Kossou (population: 28,321)

=== Bas-Sassandra District ===
- (population: 2,280,548)

==== Gbôklé Region ====
- (population: 400,798)
  - Fresco Department (population: 101,298)
  1. Dahiri (population: 36,591)
  2. Fresco (population: 41,058)
  3. Gbagbam (population: 23,649)
  - Sassandra Department (population: 299,500)
  1. Dakpadou (population: 46,529)
  2. Grihiri (population: 37,852)
  3. Lobakuya (population: 67,969)
  4. Médon (population: 16,575)
  5. Sago (population: 58,354)
  6. Sassandra (population: 72,221)

==== Nawa Region ====
- (population: 1,053,084)
  - Buyo Department (population: 183,875)
  1. Buyo (population: 103,217)
  2. Dapéoua (population: 80,658)
  - Guéyo Department (population: 83,680)
  1. Dabouyo (population: 44,467)
  2. Guéyo (population: 39,213)
  - Méagui Department (population: 320,975)
  1. Gnanmangui (population: 116,476)
  2. Méagui (population: 132,293)
  3. Oupoyo (population: 72,206)
  - Soubré Department (population: 464,554)
  1. Grand-Zattry (population: 99,343)
  2. Liliyo (population: 76,682)
  3. Okrouyo (population: 113,366)
  4. Soubré (population: 175,163)

==== San-Pédro Region ====
- (population: 826,666)
  - San-Pédro Department (population: 631,156)
  1. Doba (population: 123,530)
  2. Dogbo (population: 37,391)
  3. Gabiadji (population: 109,933)
  4. Grand-Béréby (population: 98,686)
  5. San-Pédro (population: 261,616)
  - Tabou Department (population: 195,510)
  1. Dapo-Iboké (population: 14,858)
  2. Djamandioké (population: 15,006)
  3. Djouroutou (population: 71,651)
  4. Grabo (population: 39,181)
  5. Olodio (population: 15,824)
  6. Tabou (population: 38,990)

=== Comoé District ===
- (population: 1,203,052)

==== Indénié-Djuablin Region ====
- (population: 560,432)
  - Abengourou Department (population: 336,148)
  1. Abengourou (population: 135,635)
  2. Amélékia (population: 25,238)
  3. Aniassué (population: 40,498)
  4. Ebilassokro (population: 19,433)
  5. Niablé (population: 44,967)
  6. Yakassé-Féyassé (population: 36,838)
  7. Zaranou (population: 33,539)
  - Agnibilékrou Department (population: 168,188)
  1. Agnibilékrou (population: 69,174)
  2. Akoboissué (population: 28,647)
  3. Damé (population: 15,920)
  4. Duffrébo (population: 42,426)
  5. Tanguélan (population: 12,021)
  - Bettié Department (population: 56,096)
  1. Bettié (population: 24,983)
  2. Diamarakro (population: 31,113)

==== Sud-Comoé Region ====
- (population: 642,620)
  - Aboisso Department (population: 307,852)
  1. Aboisso (population: 86,115)
  2. Adaou (population: 57,187)
  3. Adjouan (population: 25,088)
  4. Ayamé (population: 14,195)
  5. Bianouan (population: 41,442)
  6. Kouakro (population: 30,061)
  7. Maféré (population: 34,760)
  8. Yaou (population: 19,004)
  - Adiaké Department (population: 83,547)
  1. Adiaké (population: 44,257)
  2. Assinie-Mafia (population: 16,721)
  3. Etuéboué (population: 22,569)
  - Grand-Bassam Department (population: 179,063)
  1. Bongo (population: 25,052)
  2. Bonoua (population: 69,983)
  3. Grand-Bassam (population: 84,028)
  - Tiapoum Department (population: 72,158)
  1. Noé (population: 27,938)
  2. Nouamou (population: 19,148)
  3. Tiapoum (population: 25,072)

=== Denguélé District ===
- (population: 289,779)

==== Folon Region ====
- (population: 96,415)
  - Kaniasso Department (population: 58,216)
  1. Goulia (population: 18,590)
  2. Kaniasso (population: 13,600)
  3. Mahandiana-Sokourani (population: 26,026)
  - Minignan Department (population: 38,199)
  1. Kimbirila-Nord (population: 4,932)
  2. Minignan (population: 14,521)
  3. Sokoro (population: 6,704)
  4. Tienko (population: 12,042)

==== Kabadougou Region ====
- (population: 193,364)
  - Gbéléban Department (population: 18,181)
  1. Gbéléban (population: 2,569)
  2. Samango (population: 11,215)
  3. Seydougou (population: 4,397)
  - Madinani Department (population: 39,704)
  1. Fengolo (population: 5,929)
  2. Madinani (population: 25,054)
  3. N'Goloblasso (population: 8,721)
  - Odienné Department (population: 91,691)
  1. Bako (population: 17,253)
  2. Bougousso (population: 6,722)
  3. Dioulatièdougou (population: 8,028)
  4. Odienné (population: 50,506)
  5. Tiémé (population: 9,182)
  - Samatiguila Department (population: 17,483)
  1. Kimbirila-Sud (population: 8,550)
  2. Samatiguila (population: 8,933)
  - Séguélon Department (population: 26,305)
  1. Gbongaha (population: 10,407)
  2. Séguélon (population: 15,898)

=== Gôh-Djiboua District ===
- (population: 1,605,286)

==== Gôh Region ====
- (population: 876,117)
  - Gagnoa Department (population: 602,097)
  1. Bayota (population: 54,125)
  2. Dahiépa-Kéhi (population: 18,173)
  3. Dignago (population: 32,387)
  4. Dougroupalégnaoa (population: 47,083)
  5. Doukouyo (population: 21,361)
  6. Gagnoa (population: 213,918)
  7. Galebre-Galébouo (population: 33,269)
  8. Gnagbodougnoa (population: 9,981)
  9. Guibéroua (population: 64,284)
  10. Ouragahio (population: 36,364)
  11. Sérihio (population: 42,545)
  12. Yopohué (population: 28,607)
  - Oumé Department (population: 274,020)
  1. Diégonéfla (population: 75,167)
  2. Guépahouo (population: 33,798)
  3. Oumé (population: 127,850)
  4. Tonla (population: 37,205)

==== Lôh-Djiboua Region ====
- (population: 729,169)
  - Divo Department (population: 380,220)
  1. Chiépo (population: 31,006)
  2. Didoko (population: 21,660)
  3. Divo (population: 179,455)
  4. Hiré (population: 50,357)
  5. Nébo (population: 18,673)
  6. Ogoudou (population: 54,075)
  7. Zégo (population: 24,994)
  - Guitry Department (population: 146,748)
  1. Dairo-Didizo (population: 47,344)
  2. Guitry (population: 53,296)
  3. Lauzoua (population: 23,348)
  4. Yocoboué (population: 22,760)
  - Lakota Department (population: 202,201)
  1. Djidji (population: 12,375)
  2. Gagoré (population: 15,011)
  3. Goudouko (population: 26,641)
  4. Lakota (population: 77,223)
  5. Niambézaaria (population: 61,253)
  6. Zikisso (population: 9,698)

=== Lacs District ===
- (population: 1,258,604)

==== Bélier Region ====
- (population: 346,768)
  - Didiévi Department (population: 93,699)
  1. Boli (population: 13,278)
  2. Didiévi (population: 22,510)
  3. Molonou-Blé (population: 23,348)
  4. Raviart (population: 17,113)
  5. Tié-N'Diékro (population: 17,450)
  - Djékanou Department (population: 26,510)
  1. Bonikro (population: 6,420)
  2. Djékanou (population: 20,090)
  - Tiébissou Department (population: 98,734)
  1. Lomokankro (population: 14,835)
  2. Molonou (population: 20,140)
  3. Tiébissou (population: 51,539)
  4. Yakpabo-Sakassou (population: 12,220)
  - Toumodi Department (population: 127,825)
  1. Angoda (population: 14,272)
  2. Kokumbo (population: 24,650)
  3. Kpouèbo (population: 25,473)
  4. Toumodi (population: 63,430)

==== Iffou Region ====
- (population: 311,642)
  - Daoukro Department (population: 159,085)
  1. Akpassanou (population: 6,178)
  2. Ananda (population: 12,020)
  3. Daoukro (population: 73,134)
  4. Ettrokro (population: 16,492)
  5. N'Gattakro (population: 13,480)
  6. Ouellé (population: 27,521)
  7. Samanza (population: 10,260)
  - M'Bahiakro Department (population: 79,768)
  1. Bonguéra (population: 18,560)
  2. Kondossou (population: 11,320)
  3. M'Bahiakro (population: 49,888)
  - Prikro Department (population: 72,789)
  1. Anianou (population: 5,814)
  2. Famienkro (population: 11,217)
  3. Koffi-Amonkro (population: 11,893)
  4. Nafana (population: 10,623)
  5. Prikro (population: 33,242)

==== Moronou Region ====
- (population: 352,616)
  - Arrah Department (population: 80,345)
  1. Arrah (population: 33,372)
  2. Kotobi (population: 25,674)
  3. Krégbé (population: 21,299)
  - Bongouanou Department (population: 165,307)
  1. Andé (population: 51,726)
  2. Assié-Koumassi (population: 15,542)
  3. Bongouanou (population: 62,991)
  4. N'Guessankro (population: 35,048)
  - M'Batto Department (population: 106,964)
  1. Anoumaba (population: 19,463)
  2. Assahara (population: 7,227)
  3. M'Batto (population: 51,007)
  4. Tiémélékro (population: 29,267)

==== N'Zi Region ====
- (population: 247,578)
  - Bocanda Department (population: 126,910)
  1. Bengassou (population: 22,891)
  2. Bocanda (population: 60,183)
  3. Kouadioblékro (population: 17,287)
  4. N'Zécrézessou (population: 26,549)
  - Dimbokro Department (population: 91,056)
  1. Abigui (population: 9,015)
  2. Diangokro (population: 10,451)
  3. Dimbokro (population: 64,957)
  4. Nofou (population: 6,633)
  - Kouassi-Kouassikro Department (population: 29,612)
  1. Kouassi-Kouassikro (population: 23,117)
  2. Mékro (population: 6,495)

=== Lagunes District ===
- (population: 1,478,047)

==== Agnéby-Tiassa Region ====
- (population: 606,852)
  - Agboville Department (population: 292,109)
  1. Aboudé (population: 19,796)
  2. Ananguié (population: 13,786)
  3. Agboville (population: 95,093)
  4. Attobrou (population: 20,454)
  5. Azaguié (population: 21,976)
  6. Céchi (population: 22,779)
  7. Grand-Morié (population: 17,907)
  8. Guessiguié (population: 21,911)
  9. Loviguié (population: 17,048)
  10. Oress-Krobou (population: 5,806)
  11. Rubino (population: 35,553)
  - Sikensi Department (population: 78,439)
  1. Gomon (population: 20,880)
  2. Sikensi (population: 57,559)
  - Taabo Department (population: 56,422)
  1. Pacobo (population: 14,510)
  2. Taabo (population: 41,912)
  - Tiassalé Department (population: 179,882)
  1. Gbolouville (population: 28,854)
  2. Morokro (population: 35,790)
  3. N'Douci (population: 56,990)
  4. Tiassalé (population: 58,248)

==== Grands-Ponts Region ====
- (population: 356,495)
  - Dabou Department (population: 148,874)
  1. Dabou (population: 88,430)
  2. Lopou (population: 30,269)
  3. Toupah (population: 30,175)
  - Grand-Lahou Department (population: 151,313)
  1. Ahouanou (population: 35,004)
  2. Bacanda (population: 20,950)
  3. Ebonou (population: 25,314)
  4. Grand-Lahou (population: 67,483)
  5. Toukouzou (population: 2,562)
  - Jacqueville Department (population: 56,308)
  1. Attoutou (population: 24,020)
  2. Jacqueville (population: 32,288)

==== La Mé Region ====
- (population: 514,700)
  - Adzopé Department (population: 193,518)
  1. Adzopé (population: 98,846)
  2. Agou (population: 26,692)
  3. Annépé (population: 19,925)
  4. Assikoi (population: 10,735)
  5. Bécédi-Brignan (population: 22,633)
  6. Yakassé-Mé (population: 14,687)
  - Akoupé Department (population: 119,028)
  1. Afféry (population: 28,107)
  2. Akoupé (population: 66,311)
  3. Bécouéfin (population: 24,610)
  - Alépé Department (population: 125,877)
  1. Aboisso-Comoé (population: 24,609)
  2. Alépé (population: 40,480)
  3. Allosso (population: 12,703)
  4. Danguira (population: 38,417)
  5. Oghlwapo (population: 9,668)
  - Yakassé-Attobrou Department (population: 76,277)
  1. Abongoua (population: 12,197)
  2. Biéby (population: 19,998)
  3. Yakassé-Attobrou (population: 44,082)

=== Montagnes District ===
- (population: 2,371,920)

==== Cavally Region ====
- (population: 459,964)
  - Bloléquin Department (population: 123,336)
  1. Bloléquin (population: 71,854)
  2. Diboké (population: 6,168)
  3. Doké (population: 13,357)
  4. Tinhou (population: 13,293)
  5. Zéaglo (population: 18,664)
  - Guiglo Department (population: 176,688)
  1. Bédy-Goazon (population: 16,872)
  2. Guiglo (population: 113,796)
  3. Kaadé (population: 25,253)
  4. Nizahon (population: 20,767)
  - Taï Department (population: 102,948)
  1. Taï (population: 31,928)
  2. Zagné (population: 71,020)
  - Toulépleu Department (population: 56,992)
  1. Bakoubli (population: 4,013)
  2. Méo (population: 14,755)
  3. Nézobly (population: 6,679)
  4. Péhé (population: 10,835)
  5. Tiobly (population: 4,965)
  6. Toulépleu (population: 15,745)

==== Guémon Region ====
- (population: 919,392)
  - Bangolo Department (population: 318,129)
  1. Bangolo (population: 40,220)
  2. Béoué-Zibiao (population: 21,927)
  3. Bléniméouin (population: 23,979)
  4. Diéouzon (population: 31,009)
  5. Gohouo-Zagna (population: 17,800)
  6. Guinglo-Tahouaké (population: 36,368)
  7. Kahin-Zarabaon (population: 62,455)
  8. Zéo (population: 9,259)
  9. Zou (population: 75,112)
  - Duékoué Department (population: 408,148)
  1. Bagohouo (population: 46,129)
  2. Duékoué (population: 185,344)
  3. Gbapleu (population: 66,549)
  4. Guéhiébly (population: 51,933)
  5. Guézon (population: 58,193)
  - Facobly Department (population: 76,507)
  1. Facobly (population: 22,407)
  2. Guézon (population: 8,674)
  3. Koua (population: 8,515)
  4. Sémien (population: 28,812)
  5. Tiény-Séably (population: 8,099)
  - Kouibly Department (population: 116,608)
  1. Kouibly (population: 43,392)
  2. Nidrou (population: 10,343)
  3. Ouyably-Gnondrou (population: 49,470)
  4. Totrodrou (population: 13,403)

==== Tonkpi Region ====
- (population: 992,564)
  - Biankouma Department (population: 154,300)
  1. Biankouma (population: 51,269)
  2. Blapleu (population: 14,750)
  3. Gbangbégouiné (population: 3,449)
  4. Gbonné (population: 35,957)
  5. Gouiné (population: 14,909)
  6. Kpata (population: 6,741)
  7. Santa (population: 27,225)
  - Danané Department (population: 267,148)
  1. Daleu (population: 34,308)
  2. Danané (population: 104,672)
  3. Gbon-Houyé (population: 13,640)
  4. Kouan-Houlé (population: 27,926)
  5. Mahapleu (population: 44,368)
  6. Séileu (population: 19,718)
  7. Zonneu (population: 22,516)
  - Man Department (population: 334,166)
  1. Bogouiné (population: 15,172)
  2. Fagnampleu (population: 2,967)
  3. Gbangbégouiné-Yati (population: 10,068)
  4. Logoualé (population: 28,515)
  5. Man (population: 188,704)
  6. Podiagouiné (population: 21,694)
  7. Sandougou-Soba (population: 7,746)
  8. Sangouiné (population: 36,832)
  9. Yapleu (population: 7,735)
  10. Zagoué (population: 5,410)
  11. Ziogouiné (population: 9,323)
  - Sipilou Department (population: 41,868)
  1. Sipilou (population: 22,417)
  2. Yorodougou (population: 19,451)
  - Zouan-Hounien Department (population: 195,082)
  1. Banneu (population: 13,223)
  2. Bin-Houyé (population: 28,499)
  3. Goulaleu (population: 20,479)
  4. Téapleu (population: 39,244)
  5. Yelleu (population: 11,203)
  6. Zouan-Hounien (population: 82,434)

=== Sassandra-Marahoué District ===
- (population: 2,293,304)

==== Haut-Sassandra Region ====
- (population: 1,430,960)
  - Daloa Department (population: 591,633)
  1. Bédiala (population: 81,193)
  2. Daloa (population: 319,427)
  3. Gadouan (population: 57,470)
  4. Gboguhé (population: 58,103)
  5. Gonaté (population: 36,938)
  6. Zaïbo (population: 38,502)
  - Issia Department (population: 327,901)
  1. Boguédia (population: 20,943)
  2. Iboguhé (population: 41,768)
  3. Issia (population: 85,727)
  4. Nahio (population: 27,034)
  5. Namané (population: 41,177)
  6. Saïoua (population: 86,423)
  7. Tapéguia (population: 24,829)
  - Vavoua Department (population: 400,912)
  1. Bazra-Nattis (population: 39,218)
  2. Dananon (population: 31,384)
  3. Dania (population: 77,295)
  4. Kétro-Bassam (population: 24,934)
  5. Séitifla (population: 93,430)
  6. Vavoua (population: 134,651)
  - Zoukougbeu Department (population: 110,514)
  1. Domangbeu (population: 9,530)
  2. Grégbeu (population: 18,487)
  3. Guessabo (population: 36,302)
  4. Zoukougbeu (population: 46,195)

==== Marahoué Region ====
- (population: 862,344)
  - Bouaflé Department (population: 409,683)
  1. Bégbessou (population: 19,787)
  2. Bonon (population: 112,629)
  3. Bouaflé (population: 167,263)
  4. N'Douffoukankro (population: 29,097)
  5. Pakouabo (population: 18,977)
  6. Tibéita (population: 15,664)
  7. Zaguiéta (population: 46,266)
  - Gohitafla Department (population: 66,716)
  1. Gohitafla (population: 35,440)
  2. Iriéfla (population: 6,229)
  3. Maminigui (population: 25,047)
  - Sinfra Department (population: 238,015)
  1. Bazré (population: 34,781)
  2. Kononfla (population: 50,776)
  3. Kouétinfla (population: 22,181)
  4. Sinfra (population: 130,277)
  - Zuénoula Department (population: 147,930)
  1. Kanzra (population: 27,982)
  2. Vouéboufla (population: 20,454)
  3. Zanzra (population: 18,545)
  4. Zuénoula (population: 80,949)

=== Savanes District ===
- (population: 1,607,497)

==== Bagoué Region ====
- (population: 375,687)
  - Boundiali Department (population: 127,684)
  1. Baya (population: 8,591)
  2. Boundiali (population: 59,586)
  3. Ganaoni (population: 18,842)
  4. Kasséré (population: 23,983)
  5. Siempurgo (population: 16,682)
  - Kouto Department (population: 129,598)
  1. Blességué (population: 15,187)
  2. Gbon (population: 25,427)
  3. Kolia (population: 24,848)
  4. Kouto (population: 37,060)
  5. Sianhala (population: 27,076)
  - Tengréla Department (population: 118,405)
  1. Débété (population: 5,751)
  2. Kanakono (population: 22,901)
  3. Papara (population: 8,866)
  4. Tengréla (population: 80,887)

==== Poro Region ====
- (population: 763,852)
  - Dikodougou Department (population: 80,578)
  1. Boron (population: 24,239)
  2. Dikodougou (population: 39,567)
  3. Guiembé (population: 16,772)
  - Korhogo Department (population: 536,851)
  1. Dassoungboho (population: 6,363)
  2. Kanoroba (population: 18,555)
  3. Karakoro (population: 19,243)
  4. Kiémou (population: 22,422)
  5. Kombolokoura (population: 5,739)
  6. Komborodougou (population: 12,947)
  7. Koni (population: 11,948)
  8. Korhogo (population: 286,071)
  9. Lataha (population: 30,745)
  10. Nafoun (population: 7,990)
  11. Napiéolédougou (population: 23,297)
  12. N'Ganon (population: 5,386)
  13. Niofoin (population: 26,471)
  14. Sirasso (population: 28,160)
  15. Sohouo (population: 16,029)
  16. Tioroniaradougou (population: 15,485)
  - M'Bengué Department (population: 87,811)
  1. Bougou (population: 14,160)
  2. Katiali (population: 8,861)
  3. Katogo (population: 14,862)
  4. M'Bengué (population: 49,928)
  - Sinématiali Department (population: 58,612)
  1. Bouakaha (population: 5,704)
  2. Kagbolodougou (population: 9,356)
  3. Sédiego (population: 5,757)
  4. Sinématiali (population: 37,795)

==== Tchologo Region ====
- (population: 467,958)
  - Ferkessédougou Department (population: 143,263)
  1. Ferkessédougou (population: 120,150)
  2. Koumbala (population: 10,088)
  3. Togoniéré (population: 13,025)
  - Kong Department (population: 87,929)
  1. Bilimono (population: 19,873)
  2. Kong (population: 29,190)
  3. Nafana (population: 17,703)
  4. Sikolo (population: 21,163)
  - Ouangolodougou Department (population: 236,766)
  1. Diawala (population: 71,054)
  2. Kaouara (population: 27,971)
  3. Niellé (population: 29,022)
  4. Ouangolodougou (population: 74,519)
  5. Toumoukoro (population: 34,200)

=== Vallée du Bandama District ===
- (population: 1,440,826)

==== Gbêkê Region ====
- (population: 1,010,849)
  - Béoumi Department (population: 154,206)
  1. Ando-Kékrénou (population: 12,526)
  2. Béoumi (population: 73,475)
  3. Bodokro (population: 28,502)
  4. Kondrobo (population: 10,197)
  5. Lolobo (population: 8,880)
  6. Marabadiassa (population: 6,640)
  7. N'Guessankro (population: 13,986)
  - Botro Department (population: 81,424)
  1. Botro (population: 20,337)
  2. Diabo (population: 26,272)
  3. Krofoinsou (population: 11,948)
  4. Languibonou (population: 22,867)
  - Bouaké Department (population: 680,694)
  1. Bouaké-Ville (population: 536,189)
  2. Bouaké-SP (population: 71,949)
  3. Bounda (population: 10,088)
  4. Brobo (population: 16,447)
  5. Mamini (population: 15,200)
  6. N'Djébonouan (population: 30,821)
  - Sakassou Department (population: 94,525)
  1. Ayaou-Sran (population: 17,713)
  2. Dibri-Assirikro (population: 16,153)
  3. Sakassou (population: 56,230)
  4. Toumodi-Sakassou (population: 4,429)

==== Hambol Region ====
- (population: 429,977)
  - Dabakala Department (population: 189,254)
  1. Bassawa (population: 16,323)
  2. Boniérédougou (population: 23,265)
  3. Dabakala (population: 55,769)
  4. Foumbolo (population: 18,808)
  5. Niéméné (population: 15,698)
  6. Satama-Sokoro (population: 18,209)
  7. Satama-Sokoura (population: 11,603)
  8. Sokala-Sobara (population: 16,389)
  9. Tendéné-Bambarasso (population: 8,769)
  10. Yaossédougou (population: 4,421)
  - Katiola Department (population: 106,905)
  1. Fronan (population: 38,917)
  2. Katiola (population: 56,681)
  3. Timbé (population: 11,307)
  - Niakaramandougou Department (population: 133,818)
  1. Arikokaha (population: 7,416)
  2. Badikaha (population: 21,441)
  3. Niakaramandougou (population: 49,824)
  4. Niédiékaha (population: 9,648)
  5. Tafiré (population: 23,365)
  6. Tortiya (population: 22,124)

=== Woroba District ===
- (population: 845,139)

==== Bafing Region ====
- (population: 183,047)
  - Koro Department (population: 59,210)
  1. Booko (population: 18,356)
  2. Borotou (population: 5,353)
  3. Koro (population: 23,596)
  4. Mahandougou (population: 5,597)
  5. Niokosso (population: 6,308)
  - Ouaninou Department (population: 48,805)
  1. Gbélo (population: 4,941)
  2. Gouékan (population: 3,246)
  3. Koonan (population: 6,553)
  4. Ouaninou (population: 20,790)
  5. Saboudougou (population: 3,918)
  6. Santa (population: 9,357)
  - Touba Department (population: 75,032)
  1. Dioman (population: 4,817)
  2. Foungbesso (population: 18,033)
  3. Guintéguéla (population: 18,994)
  4. Touba (population: 33,188)

==== Béré Region ====
- (population: 389,758)
  - Dianra Department (population: 96,579)
  1. Dianra (population: 53,700)
  2. Dianra-Village (population: 42,879)
  - Kounahiri Department (population: 77,679)
  1. Kongasso (population: 35,642)
  2. Kounahiri (population: 42,037)
  - Mankono Department (population: 215,500)
  1. Bouandougou (population: 35,671)
  2. Mankono (population: 64,330)
  3. Marandallah (population: 36,074)
  4. Sarhala (population: 38,207)
  5. Tiéningboué (population: 41,218)

==== Worodougou Region ====
- (population: 272,334)
  - Kani Department (population: 73,889)
  1. Djibrosso (population: 11,859)
  2. Fadiadougou (population: 15,066)
  3. Kani (population: 31,211)
  4. Morondo (population: 15,753)
  - Séguéla Department (population: 198,445)
  1. Bobi-Diarabana (population: 25,249)
  2. Dualla (population: 8,130)
  3. Kamalo (population: 9,783)
  4. Massala (population: 23,021)
  5. Séguéla (population: 63,774)
  6. Sifié (population: 23,667)
  7. Worofla (population: 44,821)

=== Zanzan District ===
- (population: 934,352)

==== Bounkani Region ====
- (population: 267,167)
  - Bouna Department (population: 114,625)
  1. Bouko (population: 15,319)
  2. Bouna (population: 58,616)
  3. Ondéfidouo (population: 28,088)
  4. Youndouo (population: 12,602)
  - Doropo Department (population: 66,664)
  1. Danoa (population: 6,902
  2. Doropo (population: 37,741)
  3. Kalamon (population: 5,965)
  4. Niamoué (population: 16,056)
  - Nassian Department (population: 44,528)
  1. Bogofa (population: 5,486)
  2. Kakpin (population: 7,040)
  3. Koutouba (population: 5,705)
  4. Nassian (population: 19,971)
  5. Sominassé (population: 6,326)
  - Téhini Department (population: 41,350)
  1. Gogo (population: 11,535)
  2. Téhini (population: 15,122)
  3. Tougbo (population: 14,693)

==== Gontougo Region ====
- (population: 667,185)
  - Bondoukou Department (population: 333,707)
  1. Appimandoum (population: 6,800)
  2. Bondo (population: 19,932)
  3. Bondoukou (population: 117,453)
  4. Gouméré (population: 15,906)
  5. Laoudi-Ba (population: 56,882)
  6. Pinda-Boroko (population: 5,012)
  7. Sapli-Sépingo (population: 8,204)
  8. Sorobango (population: 27,744)
  9. Tabagne (population: 16,970)
  10. Tagadi (population: 34,440)
  11. Taoudi (population: 18,568)
  12. Yézimala (population: 5,796)
  - Koun-Fao Department (population: 116,230)
  1. Boahia (population: 9,182)
  2. Kokomian (population: 10,438)
  3. Kouassi-Datékro (population: 25,833)
  4. Koun-Fao (population: 31,982)
  5. Tankessé (population: 25,378)
  6. Tienkoikro (population: 13,417)
  - Sandégué Department (population: 56,215)
  1. Bandakagni-Tomora (population: 7,159)
  2. Dimandougou (population: 9,280)
  3. Sandégué (population: 23,068)
  4. Yorobodi (population: 16,708)
  - Tanda Department (population: 77,555)
  1. Amanvi (population: 5,312)
  2. Diamba (population: 9,680)
  3. Tanda (population: 51,958)
  4. Tchédio (population: 10,605)
  - Transua Department (population: 83,478)
  1. Assuéfry (population: 30,406)
  2. Kouassia-Niaguini (population: 16,872)
  3. Transua (population: 36,200)
