= Communes of Ivory Coast =

Fifth-level administrative unit of Ivory Coast

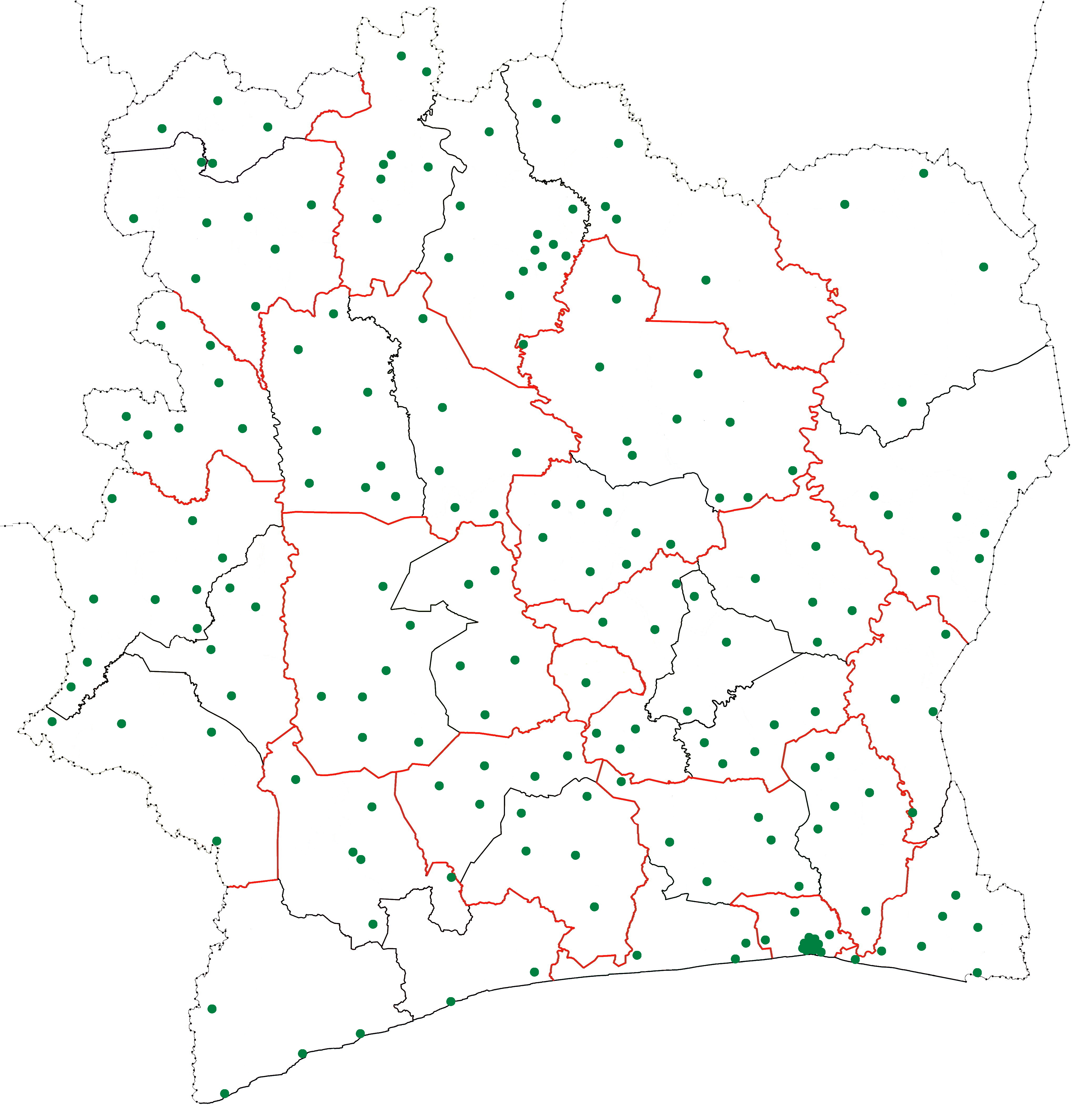
Communes of Ivory Coast. Green dots indicate the location of the settlement that serves as seat of each commune.

The communes of Ivory Coast are a fifth-level administrative unit of administration in Ivory Coast. The sub-prefectures of Ivory Coast contain villages, and in select instances more than one village is combined into a commune. There are currently 197 communes in the 510 sub-prefectures.

Prior to 2011, communes were the third-level administrative units of the country. Under the administration of Laurent Gbagbo, the number of communes grew to more than 1300. In 2011, a reorganization of the country's subdivisions was undertaken, with a goal of decentralizing the state. As part of the reorganization, communes were converted from third-level divisions into fifth-level divisions.

In March 2012, the government abolished 1126 communes on the grounds that under the new jurisdiction of districts, regions, departments, and sub-prefectures, these particular communes were not economically viable governmental units. As a result of the reorganisation, there are now 197 communes in Ivory Coast. In many parts of the country, responsibilities previously carried out by the communes have been transferred to other levels of government. In most cases, the town that is the seat of the commune is also the seat of a sub-prefecture.

== Communes A–Z ==
- Abengourou
- Abobo
- Aboisso
- Adiaké
- Adjamé
- Adzopé
- Afféry
- Agboville
- Agnibilékrou
- Agou
- Akoupé
- Alépé
- Anoumaba
- Anyama
- Arrah
- Assuéfry
- Attécoubé
- Ayamé
- Azaguié
- Bako
- Bangolo
- Bassawa
- Bédiala
- Béoumi
- Bettié
- Biankouma
- Bingerville
- Bin-Houyé
- Bloléquin
- Bocanda
- Bodokro
- Bondoukou
- Bongouanou
- Boniérédougou
- Bonon
- Bonoua
- Booko
- Borotou
- Botro
- Bouaflé
- Bouaké
- Bouna
- Boundiali
- Brobo
- Buyo
- Cocody
- Dabakala
- Dabou
- Daloa
- Danané
- Daoukro
- Diabo
- Dianra
- Diawala
- Didiévi
- Diégonéfla
- Dikodougou
- Dimbokro
- Dioulatièdougou
- Divo
- Djékanou
- Djibrosso
- Doropo
- Dualla
- Duékoué
- Ettrokro
- Facobly
- Ferkessédougou
- Foumbolo
- Fresco
- Fronan
- Gagnoa
- Gboguhé
- Gbon
- Gbonné
- Gohitafla
- Goulia
- Grabo
- Grand-Bassam
- Grand-Béréby
- Grand-Lahou
- Grand-Zattry
- Guéyo
- Guibéroua
- Guiembé
- Guintéguéla
- Guiglo
- Guitry
- Hiré
- Issia
- Jacqueville
- Kanakono
- Kani
- Kaniasso
- Karakoro
- Kasséré
- Katiola
- Kokumbo
- Kolia
- Komborodougou
- Kong
- Kongasso
- Koonan
- Korhogo
- Koro
- Kouassi-Datékro
- Kouassi-Kouassikro
- Kouibly
- Koumassi
- Koumbala
- Kounahiri
- Koun-Fao
- Kouto
- Lakota
- Logoualé
- Madinani
- Maféré
- Man
- Mankono
- Marcory
- Massala
- Mayo
- M'Bahiakro
- M'Batto
- M'Bengué
- Méagui
- Minignan
- Morondo
- Napiéolédougou
- Nassian
- N'Djébonouan
- Niablé
- Niakaramandougou
- Niellé
- Niofoin
- Odienné
- Ouangolodougou
- Ouaninou
- Ouellé
- Oumé
- Ouragahio
- Plateau
- Port-Bouët
- Prikro
- Rubino
- Saïoua
- Sakassou
- Samatiguila
- Sandégué
- Sangouiné
- San-Pédro
- Sarhala
- Sassandra
- Satama-Sokoro
- Satama-Sokoura
- Séguéla
- Séguélon
- Seydougou
- Sifié
- Sikensi
- Sinématiali
- Sinfra
- Sipilou
- Sirasso
- Songon
- Soubré
- Taabo
- Tabou
- Tafiré
- Taï
- Tanda
- Téhini
- Tengréla
- Tiapoum
- Tiassalé
- Tiébissou
- Tiémé
- Tiémélékro
- Tié-N'Diékro
- Tiéningboué
- Tienko
- Tioroniaradougou
- Tortiya
- Touba
- Toulépleu
- Toumodi
- Transua
- Treichville
- Vavoua
- Worofla
- Yakassé-Attobrou
- Yamoussoukro
- Yopougon
- Zikisso
- Zouan-Hounien
- Zoukougbeu
- Zuénoula

== Communes by district and region ==
=== Autonomous District of Abidjan ===
Urban

- Abobo
- Adjamé
- Attécoubé
- Cocody
- Koumassi
- Marcory
- Plateau
- Port-Bouët
- Treichville
- Yopougon

Rural

- Anyama
- Bingerville
- Songon

=== Bas-Sassandra District ===
Gbôklé Region

- Fresco
- Sassandra

Nawa Region

- Buyo
- Grand-Zattry
- Guéyo
- Mayo
- Méagui
- Soubré

San-Pédro Region

- Grabo
- Grand-Béréby
- San-Pédro
- Tabou

=== Comoé District ===
Indénié-Djuablin Region

- Abengourou
- Agnibilékrou
- Bettié
- Niablé

Sud-Comoé Region

- Aboisso
- Adiaké
- Ayamé
- Bonoua
- Grand-Bassam
- Maféré
- Tiapoum

=== Denguélé District ===
Folon Region

- Goulia
- Kaniasso
- Minignan
- Tienko

Kabadougou Region

- Bako
- Dioulatièdougou
- Madinani
- Odienné
- Samatiguila
- Séguélon
- Seydougou
- Tiémé

=== Gôh-Djiboua District ===
Gôh Region

- Diégonéfla
- Gagnoa
- Guibéroua
- Oumé
- Ouragahio

Lôh-Djiboua Region

- Divo
- Guitry
- Hiré
- Lakota
- Zikisso

=== Lacs District ===
Bélier Region

- Didiévi
- Djékanou
- Kokumbo
- Tiébissou
- Tié-N'Diékro
- Toumodi

Iffou Region

- Daoukro
- Ettrokro
- M'Bahiakro
- Ouellé
- Prikro

Moronou Region

- Anoumaba
- Arrah
- Bongouanou
- M'Batto
- Tiémélékro

N'Zi Region

- Bocanda
- Dimbokro
- Kouassi-Kouassikro

=== Lagunes District ===
Agnéby-Tiassa Region

- Agboville
- Azaguié
- Rubino
- Sikensi
- Taabo
- Tiassalé

Grands-Ponts Region

- Dabou
- Grand-Lahou
- Jacqueville

La Mé Region

- Adzopé
- Afféry
- Agou
- Akoupé
- Alépé
- Yakassé-Attobrou

=== Montagnes District ===
Cavally Region

- Bloléquin
- Guiglo
- Taï
- Toulépleu

Guémon Region

- Bangolo
- Duékoué
- Facobly
- Kouibly

Tonkpi Region

- Biankouma
- Bin-Houyé
- Danané
- Gbonné
- Logoualé
- Man
- Sangouiné
- Sipilou
- Zouan-Hounien

=== Sassandra-Marahoué District ===
Haut-Sassandra Region

- Bédiala
- Daloa
- Gboguhé
- Issia
- Saïoua
- Vavoua
- Zoukougbeu

Marahoué Region

- Bonon
- Bouaflé
- Gohitafla
- Sinfra
- Zuénoula

=== Savanes District ===
Bagoué Region

- Boundiali
- Gbon
- Kanakono
- Kasséré
- Kolia
- Kouto
- Tengréla

Poro Region

- Dikodougou
- Guiembé
- Karakoro
- Komborodougou
- Korhogo
- M'Bengué
- Napiéolédougou
- Niofoin
- Sinématiali
- Sirasso
- Tioroniaradougou

Tchologo Region

- Diawala
- Ferkessédougou
- Kong
- Koumbala
- Niellé
- Ouangolodougou

=== Vallée du Bandama District ===
Gbêkê Region

- Béoumi
- Bodokro
- Botro
- Bouaké
- Brobo
- Diabo
- N'Djébonouan
- Sakassou

Hambol Region

- Bassawa
- Boniérédougou
- Dabakala
- Foumbolo
- Fronan
- Katiola
- Niakaramandougou
- Satama-Sokoro
- Satama-Sokoura
- Tafiré
- Tortiya

=== Woroba District ===
Bafing Region

- Booko
- Borotou
- Guintéguéla
- Koonan
- Koro
- Ouaninou
- Touba

Béré Region

- Dianra
- Kongasso
- Kounahiri
- Mankono
- Sarhala
- Tiéningboué

Worodougou Region

- Djibrosso
- Dualla
- Kani
- Massala
- Morondo
- Séguéla
- Sifié
- Worofla

=== Autonomous District of Yamoussoukro ===
- Yamoussoukro

=== Zanzan District ===
Bounkani Region

- Bouna
- Doropo
- Nassian
- Téhini

Gontougo Region

- Assuéfry
- Bondoukou
- Kouassi-Datékro
- Koun-Fao
- Sandégué
- Tanda
- Transua

== Laws creating communes ==
The following laws and decrees created communes in Ivory Coast. Many of the communes created by these laws were abolished in the decree of March 2012.

- (in French) Loi n° 78-07 du 9 janvier 1978 portant institution de communes de plein exercice en Côte d'Ivoire
- (in French) Loi n° 80-1180 du 17 Octobre 1980 relative a l'organisation municipale modifée par les Lois N°s 85-578 du 29 juillet 1985 et 95-608 ainsi que 95-611 du 03 août 1995
- (in French) Loi n° 85-1085 du 17 octobre 1985 portant création de quatre-vingt-dix-huit (98) communes de plein exercice en Côte d'Ivoire
- (in French) Décret n° 80-1078 du 19 septembre 1980, fixant le ressort territorial des communes de Côte d'Ivoire
- (in French) Décret n° 85-1114 du 8 novembre 1985, fixant le ressort territorial de quatre-vingt-dix-huit (98) communes et portant modification des limites territoriales d'une commune
- (in French) Décret n° 90-1594 du 12 décembre 1990 portant modification du décret n° 80-1078 du 19 septembre 1980 fixant le ressort territorial des communes de Côte d'Ivoire et du décret n° 85-1114 du 8 novembre 1985 fixant le ressort de quatre-vingt-dix-huit communes et portant modification des limites territoriales d'une commune
- (in French) Décret n° 95-529 du 14 juillet 1995, portant modification du décret n° 80-1078 due 19 septembre 1980 fixant le ressort territorial des communes de Côte d'Ivoire et du décret n° 85-1114 du 8 novembre 1985, fixant le ressort territorial de quatre-vingt-dix-huit (98) communes et portant modification des limites territoriales d'une commune
- (in French) Décret n° 95-941 du 13 décembre 1995, portant création de nouvelles communes
- (in French) Décret n° 95-942 du 13 décembre 1995, fixant le ressort territorial des nouvelles communes
- (in French) Décret n° 95-945 du 13 décembre, modifiant et complétant le décret n° 80-1078 du 19 septembre 1980 fixant le ressort territorial des communes de Côte d'Ivoire, le décret n° 85-1114 du 8 novembre 1985, fixant le ressort territorial de quatre-vingt-dix-huit (98) communes et portant modification des limites territoriales d'une commune et le décret n° 95-529 du 14 juillet 1995, portant modification des décrets susvisés
- (in French) Décret n° 98-157 du 02 avril 1998 portant création de la commune de Mayo
- (in French) Décret n° 2005-314 du 6 octobre 2005, portant création de cinq cent vingt (520) communes
- (in French) Décret n° 2008-115 du 6 mars 2008, modifiant et complétant le décret n° 2005-314 du 6 octobre 2005 portant création de cinq cent vingt (520) communes
