= Poro Region =

Poro Region Région du Poro
- Region
- Seal
- Motto: "Terre d'accueil et de traditions"
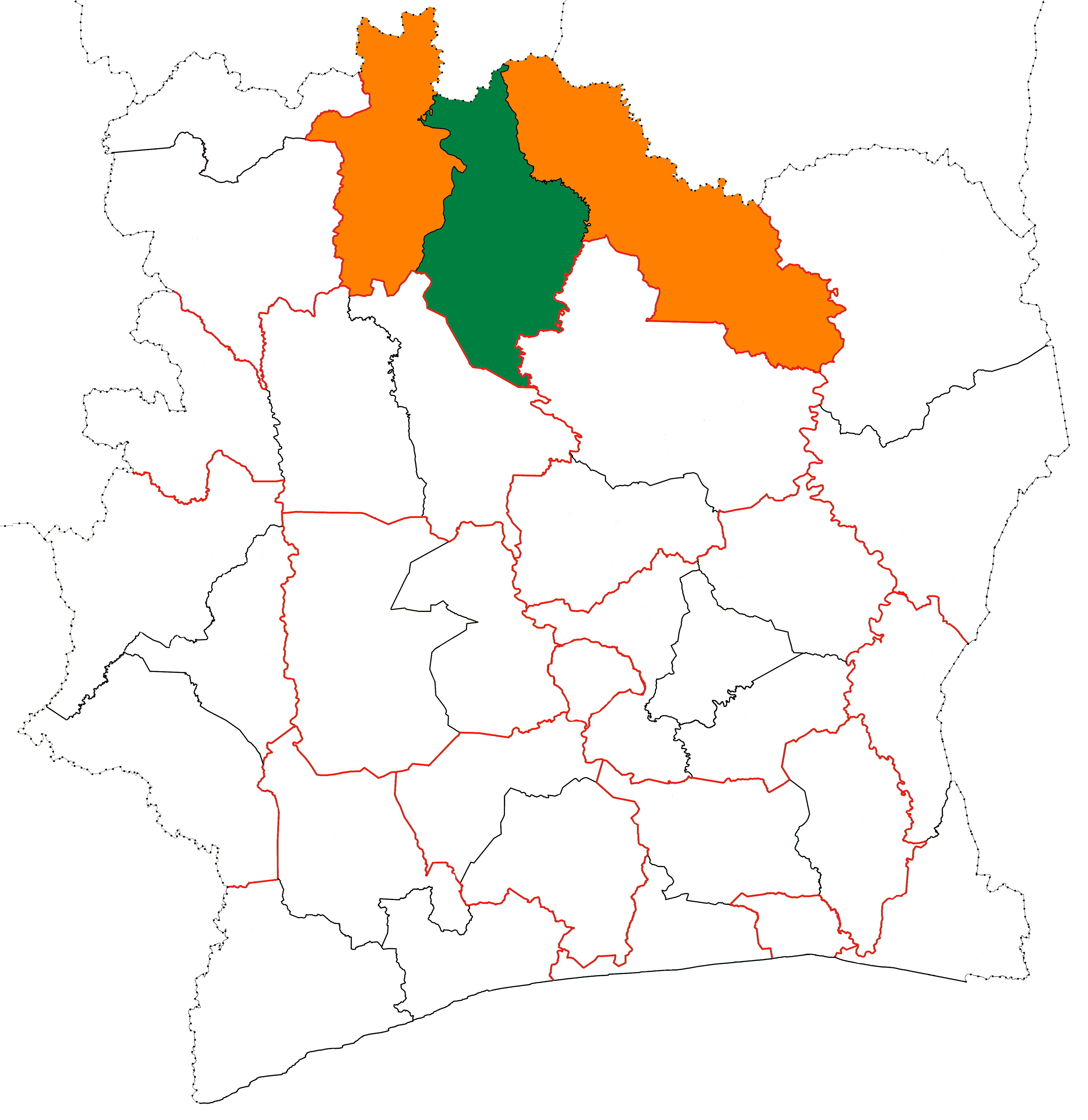
- Location of Poro Region (green) in Ivory Coast and in Savanes District
- Coordinates: 9°25′N 5°37′W
- Country: Ivory Coast
- District: Savanes
- 2011: Established
- Regional seat: Korhogo

Government
  - Prefect: Daouda Outtara
  - Council President: Tiémoko Yadé Coulibaly

Area
  - Total: 12,550 km^{2} (4,850 sq mi)

Population (2021 census)
  - Total: 1,040,461
  - Density: 82.91/km^{2} (214.7/sq mi)
- Time zone: UTC+0 (GMT)

Poro Region is one of the 31 regions of Ivory Coast. Since its establishment in 2011, it has been one of three regions in Savanes District. The seat of the region is Korhogo and the region's population in the 2021 census was 1,040,461.

Poro is currently divided into four departments: Dikodougou, Korhogo, M'Bengué, and Sinématiali.
