= Savanes District =

District of Ivory Coast

Coordinates: 9°25′N 5°37′W

Savanes District District des Savanes
- District
- Country: Ivory Coast
- Established: 2011
- Capital: Korhogo

Area
  - Total: 40,200 km^{2} (15,500 sq mi)

Population (2021 census)
  - Total: 2,159,434
  - Density: 53.7/km^{2} (139/sq mi)
- HDI (2022): 0.471 low · 12th of 14

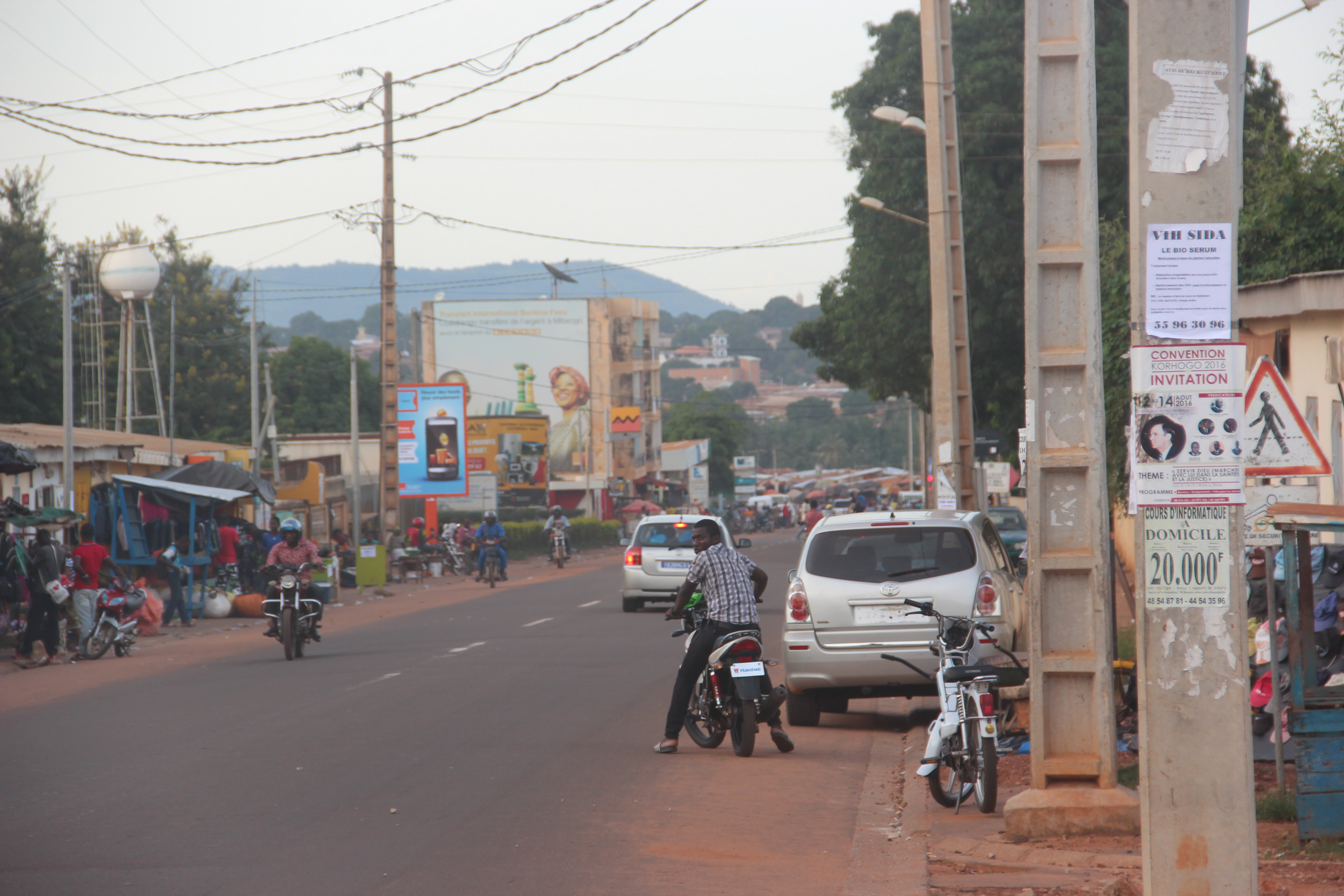
Main street in Korhogo

Savanes District (French: District des Savanes, [sa.van], "Savannahs") is one of fourteen administrative districts of Ivory Coast. The district is located in the northernmost part of the country. The capital of the district is Korhogo.

== Creation ==
Savanes District was created in a 2011 administrative reorganisation of the subdivisions of Ivory Coast. The territory of the district was composed of the former Savanes Region.

== Administrative divisions ==
Savanes District is currently subdivided into three regions and the following departments:

- Bagoué Region (region seat in Boundiali)
  - Boundiali Department
  - Kouto Department
  - Tengréla Department
- Poro Region (region seat also in Korhogo)
  - Korhogo Department
  - Sinématiali Department
  - Dikodougou Department
  - M'Bengué Department
- Tchologo Region (region seat in Ferkessédougou)
  - Ferkessédougou Department
  - Ouangolodougou Department
  - Kong Department

== Population ==
According to the 2021 census, Savanes District has a population of 2,159,434. the population of Savanes is almost entirely Muslim.
