= Doh, Ivory Coast =

Doh Do
- Village
- Location in Ivory Coast
- Coordinates: 8.19°N 7.26°W
- Country: Ivory Coast
- District: Woroba
- Region: Bafing
- Department: Touba
- Sub-prefecture: Guintéguéla
- Time zone: UTC+0 (GMT)

Doh (also spelled Do) is a village in eastern Ivory Coast. It is in the sub-prefecture of Guintéguéla, Touba Department, Bafing Region, Woroba District.

Doh was a commune until March 2012, when it became one of 1,126 communes nationwide that were abolished.
