= Ganhoué =

- Village
- Location in Ivory Coast
- Coordinates: 8°11′N 7°51′W
- Country: Ivory Coast
- District: Woroba
- Region: Bafing
- Department: Ouaninou
- Sub-prefecture: Ouaninou
- Time zone: UTC+0 (GMT)

Ganhoué is a village in the far west of Ivory Coast. It is in the sub-prefecture of Ouaninou, Ouaninou Department, Bafing Region, Woroba District.

Ganhoué was a commune until March 2012, when it became one of 1,126 communes nationwide that were abolished.
