= Massala-Barala =

- Village
- Location in Ivory Coast
- Coordinates: 8.95°N 7.82°W
- Country: Ivory Coast
- District: Woroba
- Region: Bafing
- Department: Koro
- Sub-prefecture: Booko
- Time zone: UTC+0 (GMT)

Massala-Barala is a village in north-western Ivory Coast. It is in the sub-prefecture of Booko, Koro Department, Bafing Region, Woroba District.

Massala-Barala was a commune until March 2012, when it became one of 1,126 communes nationwide that were abolished.
