= Mandougou =

- Village
- Location in Ivory Coast
- Coordinates: 8°10′N 7°48′W
- Country: Ivory Coast
- District: Woroba
- Region: Bafing
- Department: Ouaninou
- Sub-prefecture: Gbélo
- Time zone: UTC+0 (GMT)

Mandougou is a village in western Ivory Coast. It is in the sub-prefecture of Gbélo, Ouaninou Department, Bafing Region, Woroba District.

Mandougou was a commune until March 2012, when it became one of 1,126 communes nationwide that were abolished.
