= Guénimanzo =

Guénimanzo Gbénimanzo
- Village
- Location in Ivory Coast
- Coordinates: 8°12′N 7°37′W
- Country: Ivory Coast
- District: Woroba
- Region: Bafing
- Department: Touba
- Sub-prefecture: Dioman
- Time zone: UTC+0 (GMT)

Guénimanzo (also spelled Gbénimanzo) is a village in western Ivory Coast. It is in the sub-prefecture of Dioman, Touba Department, Bafing Region, Woroba District.

Guénimanzo was a commune until March 2012, when it became one of 1,126 communes nationwide that were abolished.
