= Bakandesso-Sogbéni =

- Village
- Location in Ivory Coast
- Coordinates: 7°53′N 7°42′W
- Country: Ivory Coast
- District: Woroba
- Region: Bafing
- Department: Touba
- Sub-prefecture: Foungbesso
- Time zone: UTC+0 (GMT)

Bakandesso-Sogbéni is a village in western Ivory Coast. It is in the sub-prefecture of Foungbesso, Touba Department, Bafing Region, Woroba District.

Bakandesso-Sogbéni was a commune until March 2012, when it became one of 1,126 communes nationwide that were abolished.

Bakandesso, as of 2014, had approximately 1,736 residents. Sogbéni, during that same time period, had 875 residents, for a total of 2,611 people.
