= Foungbesso =

Foungbesso Foungouésso
- Town and sub-prefecture
- Location in Ivory Coast
- Coordinates: 7°57′N 7°40′W
- Country: Ivory Coast
- District: Woroba
- Region: Bafing
- Department: Touba

Population (2014)
  - Total: 18,033
- Time zone: UTC+0 (GMT)

Foungbesso (also spelled Foungouésso) is a town in western Ivory Coast. It is a sub-prefecture of Touba Department in Bafing Region, Woroba District.

Foungbesso was a commune until March 2012, when it became one of 1,126 communes nationwide that were abolished. In 2014, the population of the sub-prefecture of Foungbesso was 18,033.

== Villages ==
The thirty five villages of the sub-prefecture of Foungbesso and their population in 2014 are

1. Bafingdalla (693)
2. Bakandesso (1,736)
3. Baniga (277)
4. Bémasso (115)
5. Boutisso (394)
6. Danduly (261)
7. Dépanon (395)
8. Dolla (1 174)
9. Douasso (321)
10. Fouenan (755)
11. Foungbesso (1,958)
12. Gasso (435)
13. Goh (670)
14. Gouana (557)
15. Gouékolo 1 (284)
16. Gouékolo 2 (137)
17. Gouéla (208)
18. Lawasso 2 (97)
19. Massasso (658)
20. N'gamonsso (449)
21. Niena (536)
22. Ohisso (236)
23. Singosso (216)
24. Sogbeni (875)
25. Sogbesso 2 (283)
26. Sokouralla Gouana (310)
27. Souatiesso (872)
28. Tiéfinisso (143)
29. Tiekourasso (242)
30. Tiemonisso (369)
31. Vahibasso (522)
32. Wagnangoro (642)
33. Yaala Fouenan (274)
34. Yamatoullo (723)
35. Zouandesso (216)
