= Borotou-Koro =

- Village
- Location in Ivory Coast
- Coordinates: 8°29′N 7°11′W
- Country: Ivory Coast
- District: Woroba
- Region: Bafing
- Department: Koro
- Sub-prefecture: Koro
- Elevation: 293 m (961 ft)
- Time zone: UTC+0 (GMT)

Borotou-Koro is a village in north-western Ivory Coast. It is in the sub-prefecture of Koro, Koro Department, Bafing Region, Woroba District.

Borotou-Koro was a commune until March 2012, when it became one of 1,126 communes nationwide that were abolished.
