= Koro, Ivory Coast =

Koro
- Town, sub-prefecture, and commune
- Location in Ivory Coast
- Coordinates: 8°33′N 7°28′W
- Country: Ivory Coast
- District: Woroba
- Region: Bafing
- Department: Koro

Population (2014)
  - Total: 23,596
- Time zone: UTC+0 (GMT)

Koro is a town in northwest Ivory Coast. It is a sub-prefecture of and the seat of Koro Department in Bafing Region, Woroba District. Koro is also a commune.

In 2014, the population of the sub-prefecture of Koro was 23,596.

== Villages ==
The seventeen villages of the sub-prefecture of Koro and their population in 2014 are:

1. Bontou (1,789)
2. Booro-Borotou (838)
3. Borotou-Koro (11,798)
4. Farako-Koro (122)
5. Gouaké (384)
6. Kassila 2 (348)
7. Koro (4,798)
8. Kountiguisso (798)
9. Massala-Koro (48)
10. Moako-Koro (308)
11. Morifinso (663)
12. Nibillo (181)
13. Sanankoro (480)
14. Touresso (386)
15. Vabouesso (201)
16. Windou-Koro (289)
17. Yakorodougou (165)
