= Santa, Woroba =

Santa
- Town and sub-prefecture
- Location in Ivory Coast
- Coordinates: 8°16′N 8°4′W
- Country: Ivory Coast
- District: Woroba
- Region: Bafing
- Department: Ouaninou

Population (2014)
  - Total: 9,357
- Time zone: UTC+0 (GMT)

Santa is a town in the far west of Ivory Coast. It is a sub-prefecture of Ouaninou Department in Bafing Region, Woroba District.

Santa was a commune until March 2012, when it became one of 1,126 communes nationwide that were abolished.

In 2014, the population of the sub-prefecture of Santa was 9,357.

== Villages ==
The eleven villages of the sub-prefecture of Santa and their population in 2014 are:

1. Drodougou (428)
2. Gbagbadougou (236)
3. Gondodougou (503)
4. Gouékro (1,282)
5. Kossagui (528)
6. Kpoho 2 (857)
7. Kpoho 3 (634)
8. Nianlé (202)
9. Santa (2,691)
10. Séfesso (980)
11. Zabanagoro (1,016)
