= Kalaha =

- Village
- Location in Ivory Coast
- Coordinates: 9°18′N 5°49′W
- Country: Ivory Coast
- District: Savanes
- Region: Poro
- Department: Dikodougou
- Sub-prefecture: Guiembé
- Time zone: UTC+0 (GMT)

Kalaha is a village in northern Ivory Coast. It is in the sub-prefecture of Guiembé, Dikodougou Department, Poro Region, Savanes District.

Kalaha was a commune until March 2012, when it became one of 1,126 communes nationwide that were abolished.
