= Gouékan =

- Town and sub-prefecture
- Location in Ivory Coast
- Coordinates: 8°2′N 7°51′W
- Country: Ivory Coast
- District: Woroba
- Region: Bafing
- Department: Ouaninou

Population (2014)
  - Total: 3,246
- Time zone: UTC+0 (GMT)

Gouékan is a town in the far west of Ivory Coast. It is a sub-prefecture of Ouaninou Department in Bafing Region, Woroba District.

Gouékan was a commune until March 2012, when it became one of 1,126 communes nationwide that were abolished. In 2014, the population of the sub-prefecture of Gouékan was 3,246.

== Villages ==
The eight villages of the sub-prefecture of Gouékan and their population in 2014 are:

1. Gbédéma (648)
2. Gouékan (723)
3. N'gohisso (196)
4. Oualou-Gouékan (550)
5. Sodiman (239)
6. Sougouékan (203)
7. Toubako-Gouékan (196)
8. Vayasso (491)
