= Kadioha =

- Village
- Location in Ivory Coast
- Coordinates: 8°58′N 5°53′W
- Country: Ivory Coast
- District: Savanes
- Region: Poro
- Department: Dikodougou
- Sub-prefecture: Dikodougou
- Time zone: UTC+0 (GMT)

Kadioha is a village in northern Ivory Coast. It is in the sub-prefecture of Dikodougou, Dikodougou Department, Poro Region, Savanes District.

Kadioha was a commune until March 2012, when it became one of 1,126 communes nationwide that were abolished.
