= Mahandougou =

- Town and sub-prefecture
- Location in Ivory Coast
- Coordinates: 9°2′N 7°50′W
- Country: Ivory Coast
- District: Woroba
- Region: Bafing
- Department: Koro

Population (2014)
  - Total: 5,597
- Time zone: UTC+0 (GMT)

Mahandougou is a town in northwest Ivory Coast. It is a sub-prefecture of Koro Department in Bafing Region, Woroba District. Less than two kilometres west is a border crossing with Guinea.

Mahandougou was a commune until March 2012, when it became one of 1,126 communes nationwide that were abolished.
