= Niokosso =

- Town and sub-prefecture
- Location in Ivory Coast
- Coordinates: 8°41′N 7°40′W
- Country: Ivory Coast
- District: Woroba
- Region: Bafing
- Department: Koro

Population (2014)
  - Total: 6,308
- Time zone: UTC+0 (GMT)

Niokosso is a town in northwest Ivory Coast. It is a sub-prefecture of Koro Department in Bafing Region, Woroba District. Five kilometres southwest of town is a border crossing with Guinea.

Niokosso was a commune until March 2012, when it became one of 1,126 communes nationwide that were abolished.
