= Saboudougou =

- Town and sub-prefecture
- Location in Ivory Coast
- Coordinates: 8°22′N 8°8′W
- Country: Ivory Coast
- District: Woroba
- Region: Bafing
- Department: Ouaninou

Population (2014)
  - Total: 3,918
- Time zone: UTC+0 (GMT)

Saboudougou is a town in the far west of Ivory Coast. It is a sub-prefecture of Ouaninou Department in Bafing Region, Woroba District.

Saboudougou was a commune until March 2012, when it became one of 1,126 communes nationwide that were abolished.

In 2014, the population of the sub-prefecture of Saboudougou was 3,918.

== Villages ==
The six villages of the sub-prefecture of Saboudougou and their population in 2014 are:

1. Gomandougou (112)
2. Kpoho 1 (675)
3. Ouéna (362)
4. Saboudougou (1,939)
5. Sogbessèdougou (334)
6. Zodoufouma (496)
