= Dioman =

- Town and sub-prefecture
- Location in Ivory Coast
- Coordinates: 8°16′N 8°4′W
- Country: Ivory Coast
- District: Woroba
- Region: Bafing
- Department: Touba

Population (2014)
  - Total: 4,817
- Time zone: UTC+0 (GMT)

Dioman is a town in the far west of Ivory Coast. It is a sub-prefecture of Touba Department in Bafing Region, Woroba District.

Dioman was a commune until March 2012, when it became one of 1,126 communes nationwide that were abolished.

In 2014, the population of the sub-prefecture of Dioman was 4,817.

== Villages ==
The twenty three villages of the sub-prefecture of Dioman and their population in 2014 are:

1. Bengoro-Dioman (226)
2. Boula-Dioman (107)
3. Diesso-Dioman (162)
4. Dioman (786)
5. Fouala (526)
6. Gagnasso (197)
7. Gatasso (224)
8. Gbéka (114)
9. Gbenigoro (132)
10. Gbotola (86)
11. Guénimanzo (459)
12. Kouesso (113)
13. Kouroukoro-Dioman (62)
14. Lawasso 1 (81)
15. Longana (59)
16. Mamousso (103)
17. Saala-Dioman (61)
18. Saala-Guénimanzo (84)
19. Sogbosso 1 (34)
20. Taako (234)
21. Touko (291)
22. Toulo (489)
23. Yengoro (187)
