= Gbélo =

- Town and sub-prefecture
- Location in Ivory Coast
- Coordinates: 8°9′N 7°45′W
- Country: Ivory Coast
- District: Woroba
- Region: Bafing
- Department: Ouaninou

Population (2014)
  - Total: 4,941
- Time zone: UTC+0 (GMT)

Gbélo is a town in the far west of Ivory Coast. It is a sub-prefecture of Ouaninou Department in Bafing Region, Woroba District.

Gbélo was a commune until March 2012, when it became one of 1,126 communes nationwide that were abolished. In 2014, the population of the sub-prefecture of Ouaninou was 20,790.

== Villages ==
The forty one villages of the sub-prefecture of Ouaninou and their population in 2014 are:

1. Binvè (489)
2. Férentella (885)
3. Ganhoué (1,201)
4. Konigoro 1 (307)
5. Kozéma (263)
6. Lahidougou (110)
7. Oualou-Ganhoué (164)
8. Ouaninou (6,899)
9. Sèfina (353)
10. Silakoro-Ganhoué (169)
11. Sinkoro (495)
12. Tirikoro (901)
13. Toubako-Ganhoué (101)
14. Toutié (479)
15. Vahidougou (514)
16. Babadougou (312)
17. Bassam (109)
18. Bayola (461)
19. Békosso (478)
20. Bondounlo (106)
21. Bounda (555)
22. Faala (485)
23. Goloutoulo (1,028)
24. Gooko (158)
25. Guê (128)
26. Konigoro 2 (46)
27. Koungbèkoro (440)
28. Mamouesso (105)
29. Méhidougou (141)
30. Ohidougou (199)
31. Ouintoulo (143)
32. Sakofè (260)
33. Sanandougou (231)
34. Sérifoula (381)
35. Sidougou-Ganhoué (55)
36. Tiahoué (740)
37. Tiékomandougou (101)
38. Tiénivè (115)
39. Tika (131)
40. Tounvé (322)
41. Vacérisso (230)
