= Ouaninou =

Ouaninou Waninou
- Town, sub-prefecture, and commune
- Location in Ivory Coast
- Coordinates: 8°14′N 7°52′W
- Country: Ivory Coast
- District: Woroba
- Region: Bafing
- Department: Ouaninou

Population (2014)
  - Total: 20,790
- Time zone: UTC+0 (GMT)

Ouaninou (also spelled Waninou) is a town in northwest Ivory Coast. It is a sub-prefecture of and the seat of Ouaninou Department in Bafing Region, Woroba District. Ouaninou is also a commune. In 2014, the population of the sub-prefecture of Ouaninou was 20,790.

== Villages ==
The forty-one villages of the sub-prefecture of Ouaninou and their population in 2014 are:

1. Babadougou (312)
2. Bassam (109)
3. Bayola (461)
4. Binvè (489)
5. Bondounlo (106)
6. Bounda (555)
7. Békosso (478)
8. Faala (485)
9. Férentélla (885)
10. Ganhoué (1,201)
11. Goloutoulo (1,028)
12. Gooko (158)
13. Guê (128)
14. Konigoro 1 (307)
15. Konigoro 2 (46)
16. Koungbèkoro (440)
17. Kozéma (263)
18. Lahidougou (110)
19. Mamouesso (105)
20. Méhidougou (141)
21. Ohidougou (199)
22. Oualou-Ganhoué (164)
23. Ouaninou (6,899)
24. Ouintoulo (143)
25. Sakofè (260)
26. Sanandougou (231)
27. Sidougou-Ganhoué (55)
28. Silakoro-Ganhoué (169)
29. Sinkoro (495)
30. Sèfina (353)
31. Sérifoula (381)
32. Tiahoué (740)
33. Tika (131)
34. Tirikoro (901)
35. Tiékomandougou (101)
36. Tiénivè (115)
37. Toubako-Ganhoué (101)
38. Tounvé (322)
39. Toutié (479)
40. Vacérisso (230)
41. Vahidougou (514)
