= Booko =

- Town, sub-prefecture, and commune
- Location in Ivory Coast
- Coordinates: 8°53′N 7°47′W
- Country: Ivory Coast
- District: Woroba
- Region: Bafing
- Department: Koro

Population (2014)
  - Total: 18,356
- Time zone: UTC+0 (GMT)

Booko is a town in north-western Ivory Coast. It is a sub-prefecture and commune of Koro Department in Bafing Region, Woroba District.

In 2014, the population of the sub-prefecture of Booko was 18,356.

== Villages ==
The forty five villages of the sub-prefecture of Booko and their population in 2014 are:

1. Booko (3 651)
2. Dienguéré (473)
3. Dougbè (428)
4. Farako-Moambasso (478)
5. Kessienko (461)
6. Méfandougou (477)
7. Mémadougou 2 (116)
8. Niamandougou (953)
9. Sagbanikoro (178)
10. Toranou (950)
11. Badala (1 035)
12. Blamadougou (41)
13. Booro-Kessienko (499)
14. Brimala (85)
15. Diala (150)
16. Douagbesso (328)
17. Féna-Barala (181)
18. Ggbanadougou (138)
19. Kaala (196)
20. Kessesso (177)
21. Koffina (1 164)
22. Konsasso-Massala (156)
23. Konsasso-Sokourala (208)
24. Lahomodougou (280)
25. Massala-Barala (695)
26. Massala-Sokourani (385)
27. Moako-Booko (173)
28. Moambasso (869)
29. Mofouinso (44)
30. Moritiédougou (65)
31. Ouayèrè (251)
32. Ourossanisso (689)
33. Sémodougou (95)
34. Séna (102)
35. Sessinko (28)
36. Silakoro-Moambasso (258)
37. Silakoro-Sokourala (545)
38. Sokoro-Kessienko (72)
39. Somana (231)
40. Tamadougou (116)
41. Tiana (91)
42. Tiémokodougou (86)
43. Tienlo (367)
44. Tounzi (260)
45. Yaossedougou (131)
