= Nord Department (Ivory Coast) =

Department of Ivory Coast (1961–1969)

Nord Department Département de Nord
- Department of Ivory Coast
- 1961–1969
- The location of Nord Department in Ivory Coast. The boundaries of the other departments are those that existed in 1963–69.
- Capital: Korhogo
- History
  - Established as a first-level subdivision: 1961
  - Disestablished: 1969
- Today part of: Denguélé, Savanes, and Woroba Districts

Nord Department was one of the original four departments of Ivory Coast. It was established in 1961, along with Centre Department, Sud-Est Department, and Sud-Ouest Department. During Nord Department's existence, departments were the first-level administrative subdivisions of Ivory Coast.

Using current boundaries as a reference, the territory of Nord Department was composed of Denguélé District, Savanes District, and Woroba District.

In 1969, Nord Department and the other five existing departments of the country were abolished and replaced with 24 new departments. The territory of Nord Department became the new departments of Boundiali, Ferkessédougou, Korhogo, Odienné, Séguéla, and Touba.

Nord Department and the other three original departments of Ivory Coast (1961–63)
