= Guintéguéla =

- Town, sub-prefecture, and commune
- Location in Ivory Coast
- Coordinates: 8°17′N 7°19′W
- Country: Ivory Coast
- District: Woroba
- Region: Bafing
- Department: Touba

Population (2014)
  - Total: 18,994
- Time zone: UTC+0 (GMT)

Guintéguéla is a town in western Ivory Coast. It is a sub-prefecture and commune of Touba Department in Bafing Region, Woroba District. In 2014, the population of the sub-prefecture of Guintéguéla was 18,994.

== Villages ==
The twenty two villages of the sub-prefecture of Guintéguéla and their population in 2014 are:

1. Banzi (213)
2. Faman (165)
3. Guintéguéla (4 276)
4. Kolon (416)
5. Kongorona (148)
6. Konima (1 007)
7. Madialo (646)
8. Tienfou (275)
9. Vacerrisso (220)
10. Arsenekro (420)
11. Bahadala (433)
12. Bontoma (148)
13. Bonzo (1 825)
14. Doh (1 254)
15. Fénan (464)
16. Gbétéma (1 086)
17. Gouana (1 261)
18. Gouralo (368)
19. Kaako (457)
20. Ladjidougou (324)
21. Ouebasso (2 103)
22. Sorotona (1 485)
