= Sud Department (Ivory Coast) =

Department of Ivory Coast (1961–1969)

Sud Department Département de Sud
- Department of Ivory Coast
- 1961–1969
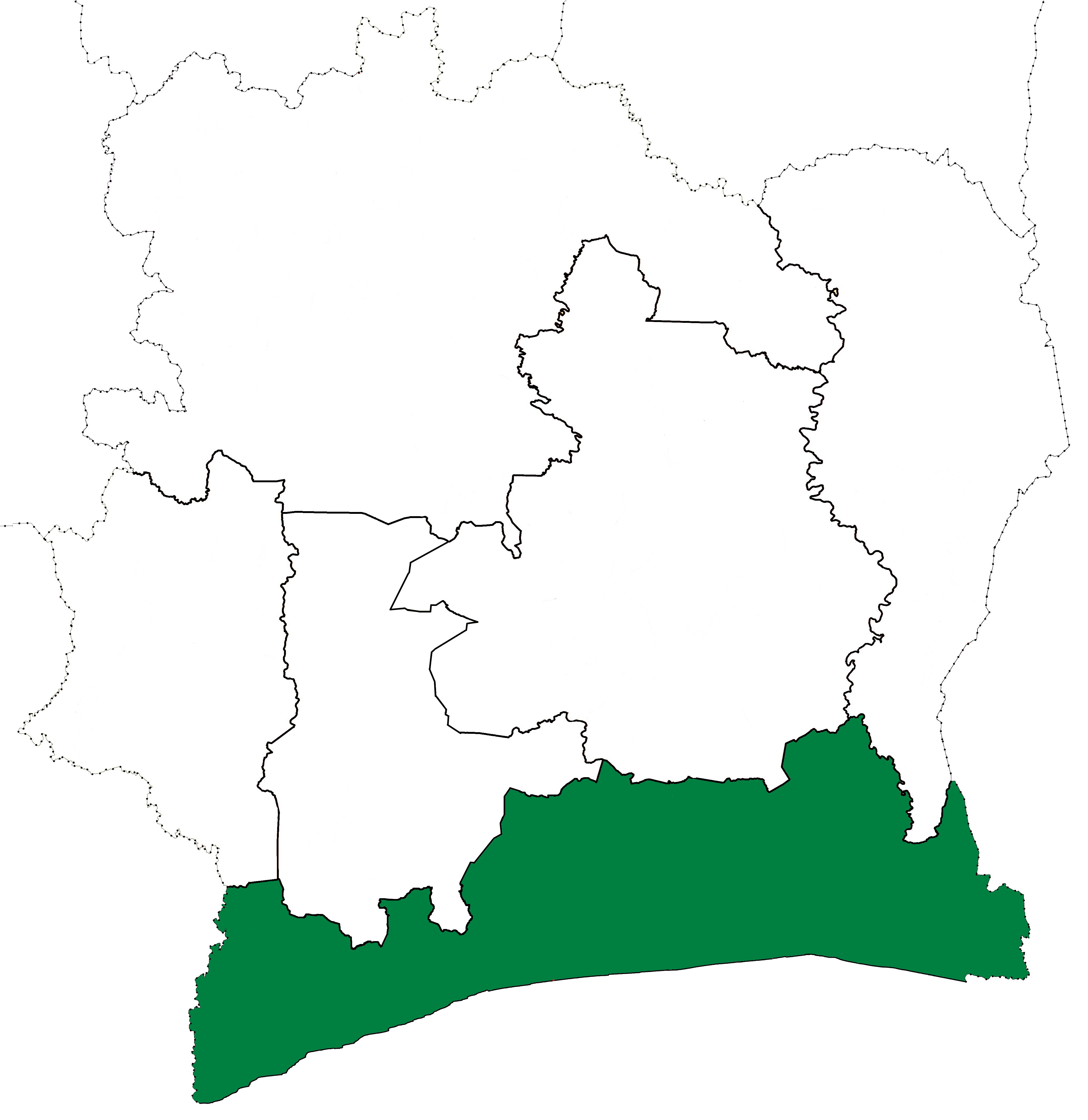
- The location of Sud Department in Ivory Coast. The boundaries of the departments are those that existed in 1963–69.
- Capital: Abidjan
- History
  - Established as a first-level subdivision as Sud-Est Department: 1961
  - Divided to create Est Dept: 1963
  - Renamed Sud Department: 1963
  - Disestablished: 1969
- Today part of: As Sud Dept: Abidjan Autonomous and Lagunes Districts; Gbôklé, Lôh-Djiboua, San-Pédro, and Sud-Comoé Regions; As Sud-Est Dept: Abidjan Autonomous, Lagunes, and Zanzan Districts; Gbôklé, Indénié-Djuablin, Lôh-Djiboua, San-Pédro, and Sud-Comoé Regions

Sud Department (originally Sud-Est Department) was one of the original four departments of Ivory Coast. It was established in 1961, along with Centre Department, Nord Department, and Sud-Ouest Department. During Sud Department's existence, departments were the first-level administrative subdivisions of Ivory Coast.

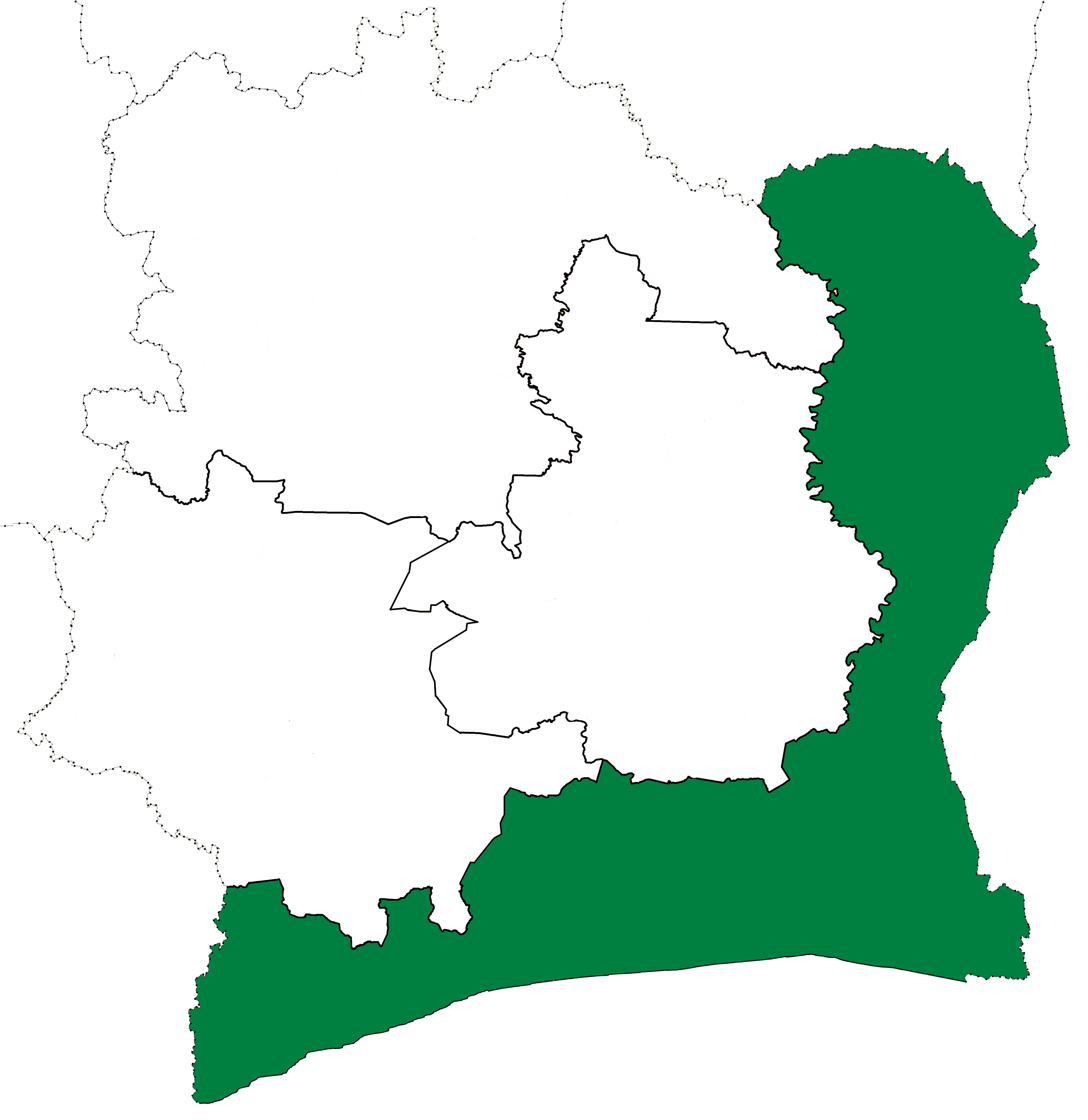
Sud-Est Department and the other three original departments of Ivory Coast (1961–63)

The department was established as Sud-Est Department. Using current boundaries as a reference, the territory of Sud-Est Department was composed of Abidjan Autonomous District, Comoé District, Gbôklé Region, Lagunes District, Lôh-Djiboua Region, San-Pédro Region, and Zanzan District.

In 1963, Est Department was created by dividing Sud-Est Department. As a result of this division, Sud-Est Department was renamed Sud Department. Using current boundaries as a reference, the territory of Sud Department was composed of Abidjan Autonomous District, Gbôklé Region, Lagunes District, Lôh-Djiboua Region, San-Pédro Region, and Sud-Comoé Region.

In 1969, Sud Department and the other five existing departments of the country were abolished and replaced with 24 new departments. The territory of Sud Department became the new departments of Abidjan, Aboisso, Adzopé, Agboville, Divo, and Sassandra.
