= Sokourala, Ivory Coast =

Sokourala
- Village
- Location in Ivory Coast
- Coordinates: 8.08°N 6.16°W
- Country: Ivory Coast
- District: Woroba
- Region: Béré
- Department: Mankono
- Sub-prefecture: Mankono
- Time zone: UTC+0 (GMT)

Sokourala is a village in northwestern Ivory Coast. It is in the sub-prefecture of Mankono, Mankono Department, Béré Region, Woroba District.

Until 2012, Sokourala was in the commune of Sokourala-Mahou. In March 2012, Sokourala-Mahou became one of 1,126 communes nationwide that were abolished.
