= Trafesso =

- Village
- Location in Ivory Coast
- Coordinates: 7°49′N 6°38′W
- Country: Ivory Coast
- District: Woroba
- Region: Worodougou
- Department: Séguéla
- Sub-prefecture: Séguéla
- Time zone: UTC+0 (GMT)

Trafesso is a village in western Ivory Coast. It is in the sub-prefecture of Séguéla, Séguéla Department, Worodougou Region, Woroba District.

Trafesso was a commune until March 2012, when it became one of 1,126 communes nationwide that were abolished.
