= Boron, Ivory Coast =

Boron
- Town and sub-prefecture
- Location in Ivory Coast
- Coordinates: 8°42′N 5°58′W
- Country: Ivory Coast
- District: Savanes
- Region: Poro
- Department: Dikodougou

Population (2014)
  - Total: 24,239
- Time zone: UTC+0 (GMT)

Boron is a town in north-central Ivory Coast. It is a sub-prefecture of Dikodougou Department in Poro Region, Savanes District. The town sits just northeast of the border of Woroba District.

Boron was a commune until March 2012, when it became one of 1,126 communes nationwide that were abolished.

In 2014, the population of the sub-prefecture of Boron was 24,239.

== Villages ==
The six villages of the sub-prefecture of Boron and their population in 2014 are:

1. Bissidougou (2,309)
2. Boron (6,135)
3. Farakoro (3,270)
4. Gbondougou (2,294)
5. Marha (5,502)
6. Ouattaradougou (4,729)
