= Mahana =

Mahana may refer to:

== Places ==
- Mahana, List of schools in the Tasman District
- Mahana, site of Kokia cookei trees, northeast of Puu Nana
- Mahana Airport, airport serving Touba, Côte d'Ivoire
- Mahana Beach, located near South Point, in the Kaʻū district of the island of Hawaiʻi
- Mahana, Narayanganj, Dhaka Div, Bangladesh
- Mahana, Administrative divisions of French Polynesia

== People ==
- Nur Mahana, Syrian singer
- Satish Mahana (born 1960), Indian politician from the BJP
- Mahana, fictional character in Johnny Lingo

== Film ==
- Mahana (film), 2016 New Zealand drama film directed by Lee Tamahori
