= Touba, Ivory Coast =

Touba
- Town, sub-prefecture, and commune
- Location in Ivory Coast Touba (Africa)
- Coordinates: 8°17′N 7°41′W
- Country: Ivory Coast
- District: Woroba
- Region: Bafing
- Department: Touba

Area
  - Total: 983 km^{2} (380 sq mi)

Population (2021 census)
  - Total: 55,013
  - Density: 56.0/km^{2} (145/sq mi)
  - Town: 22,361
- (2014 census)
- Time zone: UTC+0 (GMT)

Touba is a town in western Ivory Coast. It is a sub-prefecture of and the seat of Touba Department. It is also a commune and the seat of Bafing Region in Woroba District, near the border with Guinea.

Touba is a market town known for its stilt dancing, which takes place in nearby villages. It is viewed as the capital of the Mahouka people. The town is served by Mahana Airport.

In 2021, the population of the sub-prefecture of Touba was 55,013.

== Villages ==
The forty one villages of the sub-prefecture of Touba and their population in 2014 are:

1. Fobédougou (204)
2. Kamassella (570)
3. Kohidougou (128)
4. Kouroukoro (267)
5. Mahana (300)
6. Mimballa (512)
7. N'golodougou (519)
8. Orossanisso (153)
9. Saala-Kamassella (92)
10. Sanakoro (355)
11. Sékodougou (186)
12. Siano (119)
13. Touba (22 361)
14. Toubako-Kamassella (185)
15. Yo (359)
16. Bangofè (173)
17. Bengoro-Tienko (160)
18. Bénigoro (108)
19. Bianko (262)
20. Boola (90)
21. Booni (265)
22. Bouindala (343)
23. Fahimasso (135)
24. Gbanadougou (44)
25. Godoufouna (414)
26. Gouéla-Tienko (60)
27. Londanan (163)
28. Madina (376)
29. Morigbèdougou (51)
30. Silakoro (674)
31. Sogbosso (26)
32. Sokourala-Mahou (1 073)
33. Tiasso (82)
34. Tiékourasso-Tienko (96)
35. Tienko (424)
36. Toa (287)
37. Touéla (164)
38. Yaala-Touba (345)
39. Yatienso (138)
40. Zaala (496)
41. Zoh (429)
