= Est Department =

Est Department Département d'Est
- Department of Ivory Coast
- 1963–1969
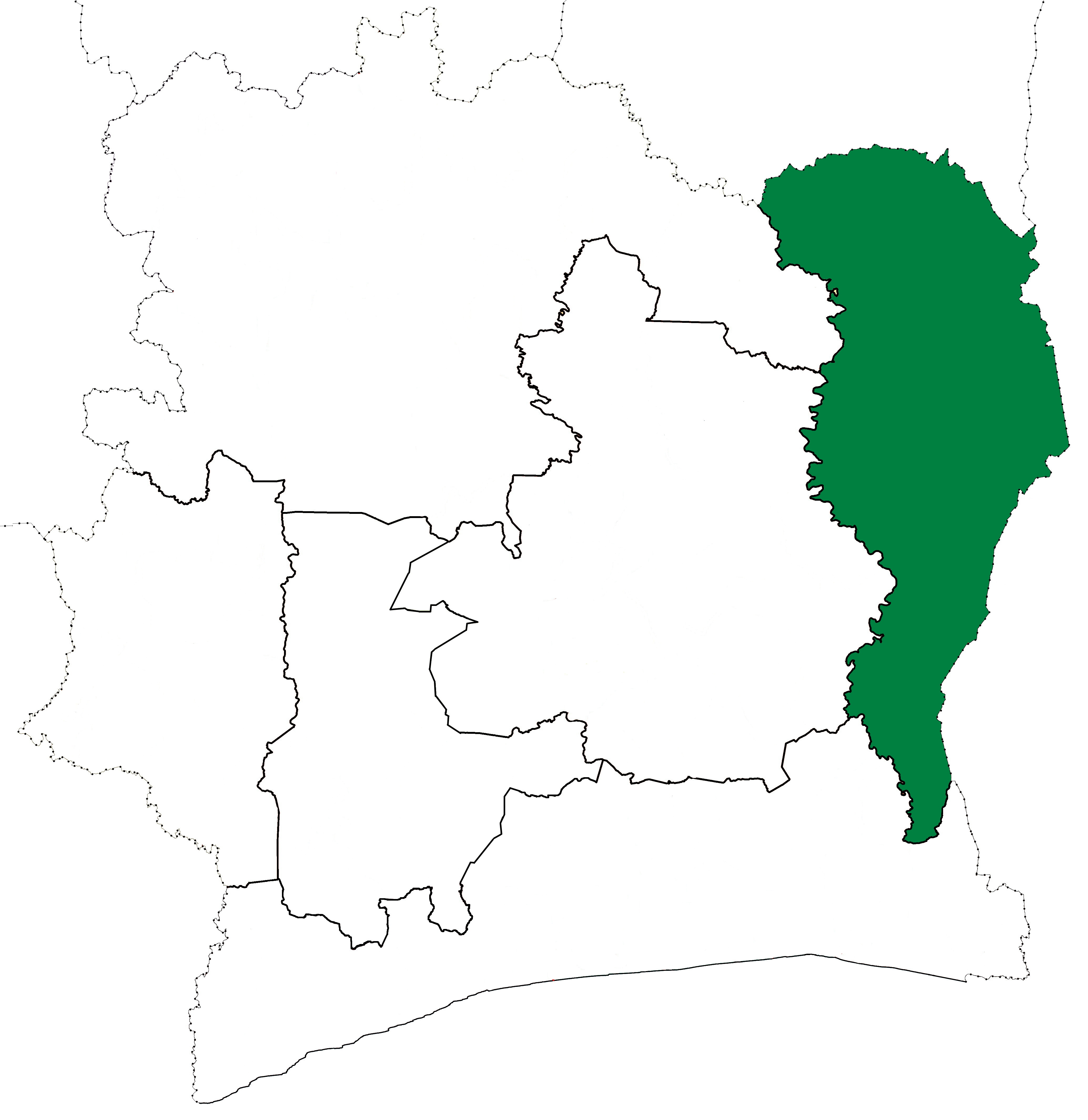
- The location of Est Department in Ivory Coast.
- Capital: Abengourou
- History
  - Established via a division of Sud-Est Dept: 1963
  - Disestablished: 1969
- Today part of: Indénié-Djuablin Region and Zanzan District

Est Department was one a departments of Ivory Coast between 1963 and 1969. It was established in 1963 as a split-off from Sud-Est Department. During Est Department's existence, departments were the first-level administrative subdivisions of Ivory Coast.

Using current boundaries as a reference, the territory of Est Department was composed of Indénié-Djuablin Region and Zanzan District.

In 1969, Est Department and the other five existing departments of the country were abolished and replaced with 24 new departments. The territory of Est Department became the new departments of Abengourou and Bondoukou.
