= Ouest Department (Ivory Coast) =

Department of Ivory Coast (1961–1969)

Ouest Department Département de Ouest
- Department of Ivory Coast
- 1961–1969
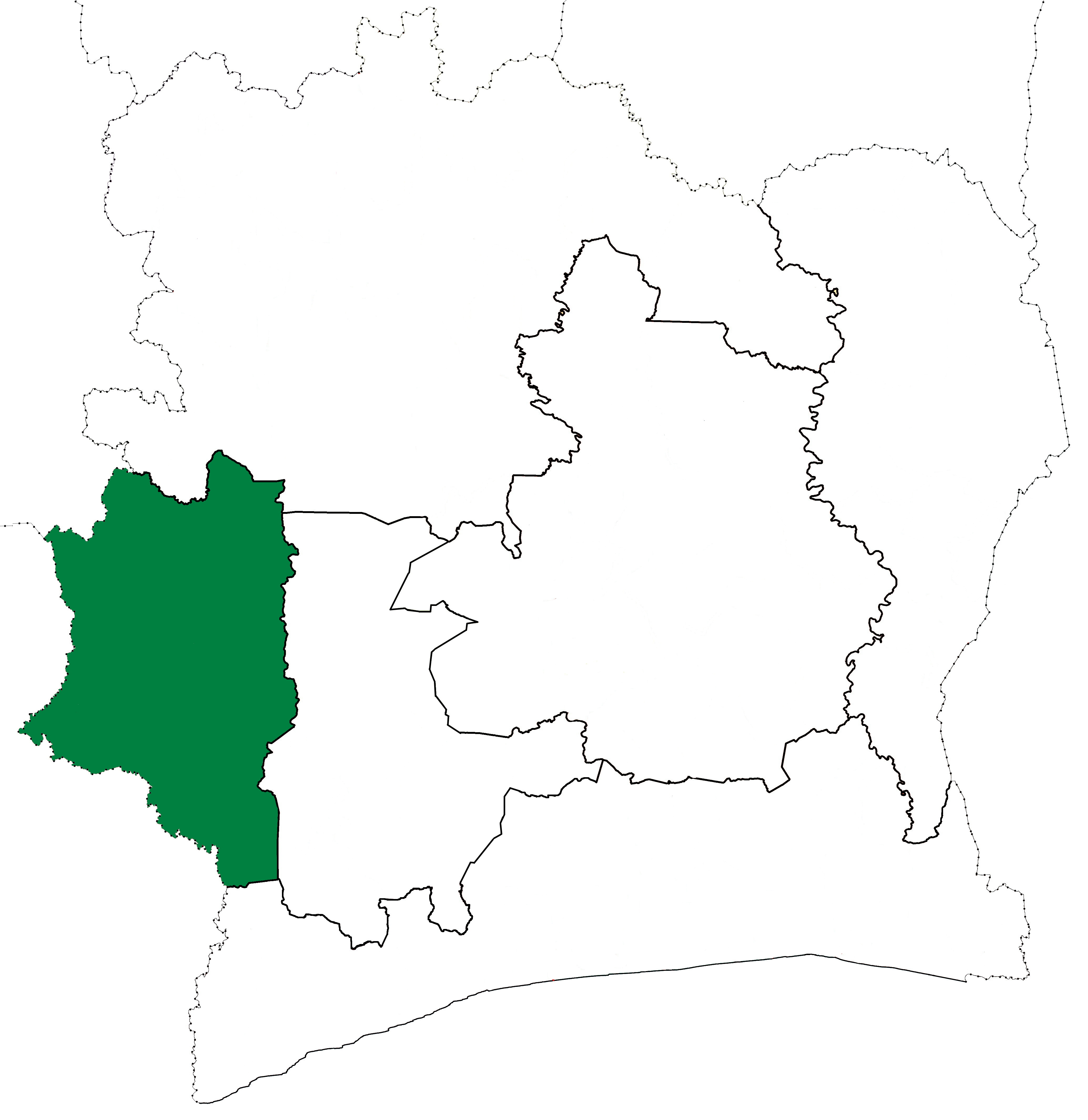
- The location of Ouest Department in Ivory Coast. The boundaries of the departments are those that existed in 1963–69.
- Capital: Man
- History
  - Established as a first-level subdivision as Sud-Ouest Department: 1961
  - Divided to create Centre-Ouest Dept: 1963
  - Renamed Ouest Department: 1963
  - Disestablished: 1969
- Today part of: As Ouest Dept: Montagnes District; As Sud-Ouest Dept: Montagnes District; Haut-Sassandra, Gôh, and Nawa Regions

Ouest Department (originally Sud-Ouest Department) was one of the original four departments of Ivory Coast. It was established in 1961, along with Centre Department, Nord Department, and Sud-Est Department. During Ouest Department's existence, departments were the first-level administrative subdivisions of Ivory Coast.

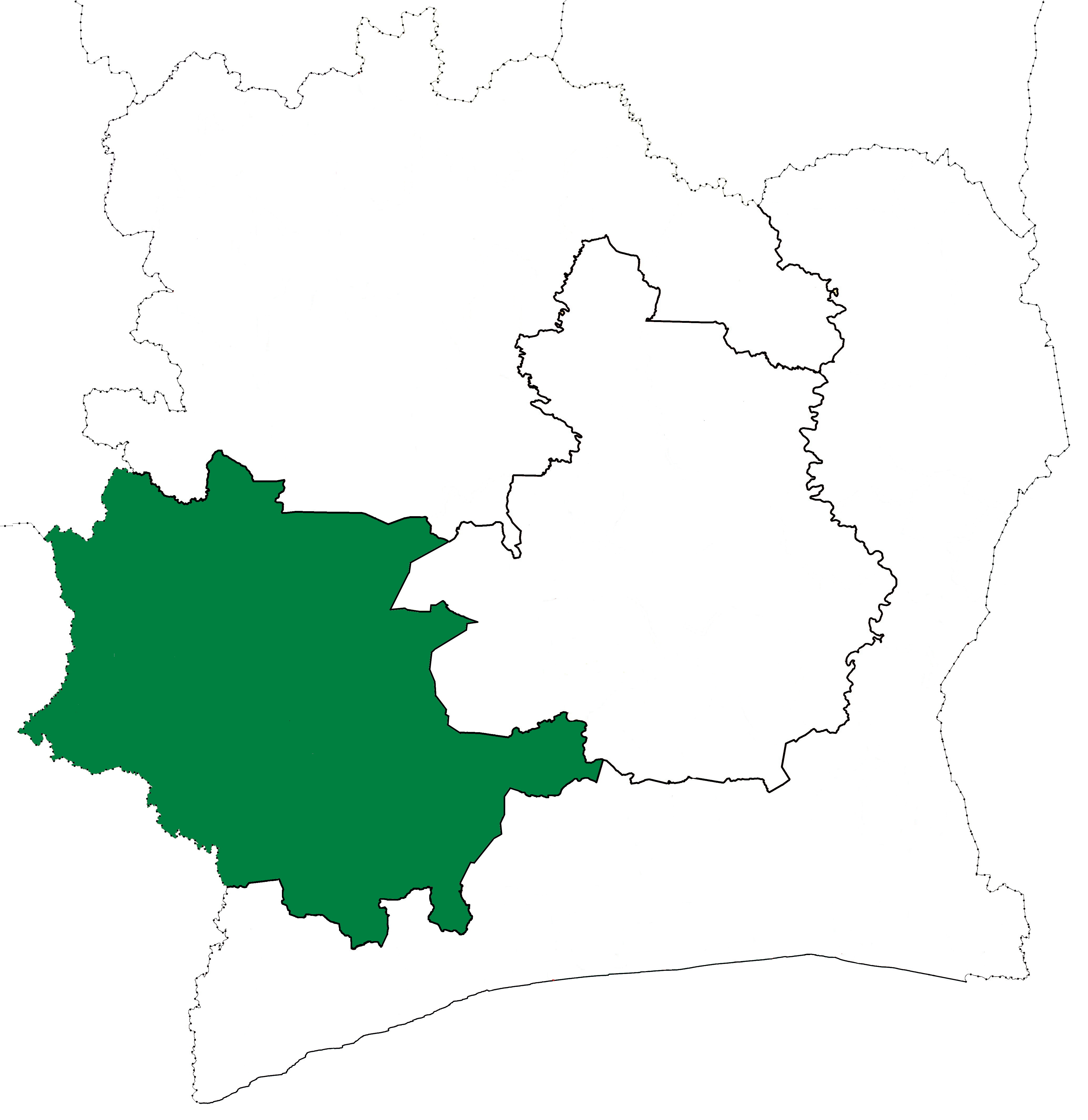
Sud-Ouest Department and the other three original departments of Ivory Coast (1961–63)

The department was established as Sud-Ouest Department. Using current boundaries as a reference, the territory of Sud-Ouest Department was composed of Haut-Sassandra Region, Gôh Region, Montagnes District, and Nawa Region.

In 1963, Centre-Ouest Department was created by dividing Sud-Ouest Department. As a result of this division, Sud-Ouest Department was renamed Ouest Department. Using current boundaries as a reference, in 1963 Ouest Department occupied the same territory as Montagnes District.

In 1969, Ouest Department and the other five existing departments of the country were abolished and replaced with 24 new departments. The territory of Ouest Department became the new departments of Biankouma, Danané, Guiglo, and Man.
