= Centre-Ouest Department =

Centre-Ouest Department Département de Centre-Ouest
- Department of Ivory Coast
- 1963–1969
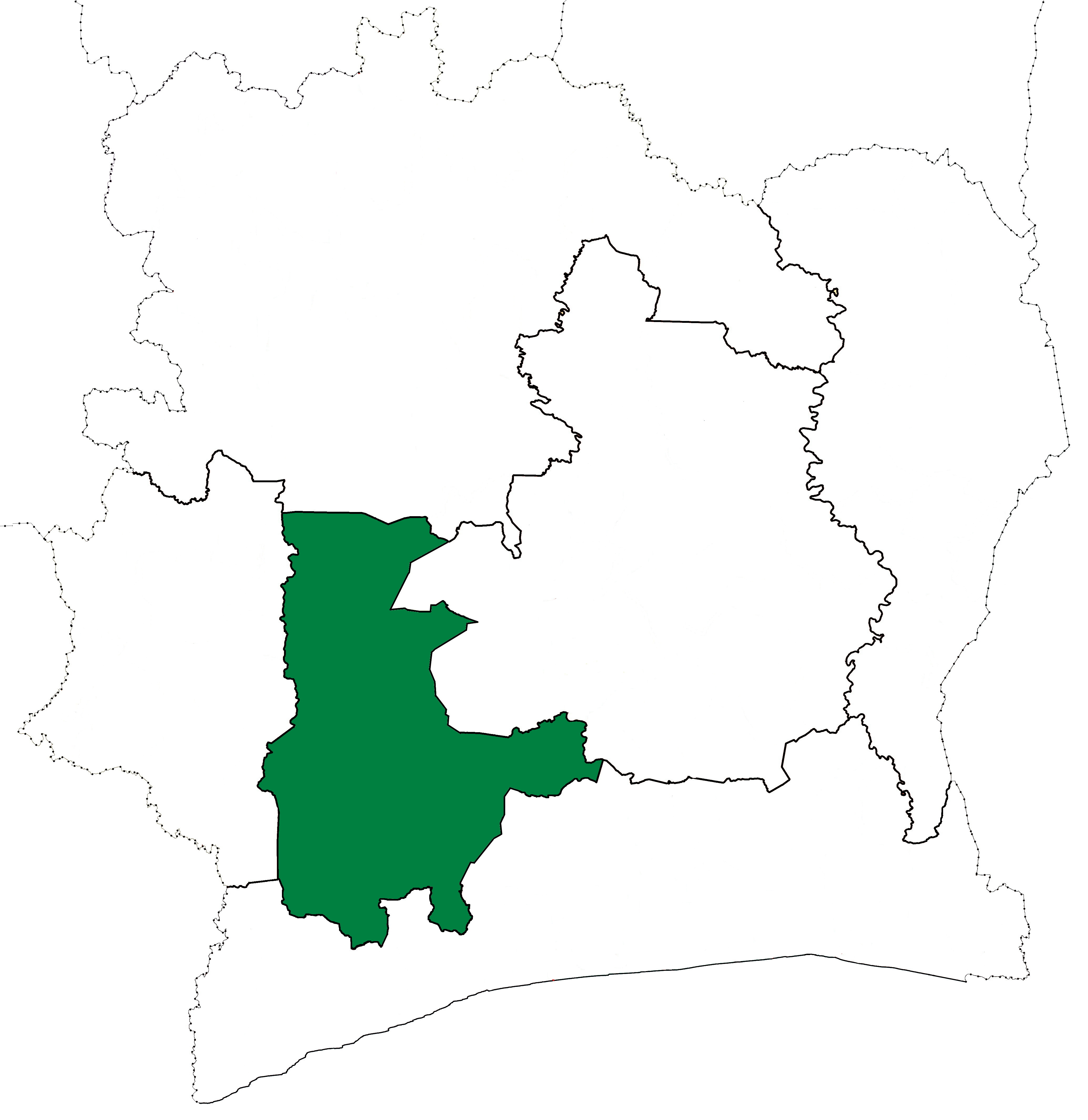
- The location of Centre-Ouest Department in Ivory Coast.
- Capital: Daloa
- History
  - Established as a first-level subdivision via a division of Sud-Ouest Dept: 1963
  - Disestablished: 1969
- Today part of: Haut-Sassandra, Gôh, and Nawa Regions

Centre-Ouest Department was a department of Ivory Coast between 1963 and 1969. It was established in 1963 as a split-off from Sud-Ouest Department. During Centre-Ouest Department's existence, departments were the first-level administrative subdivisions of Ivory Coast.

Using current boundaries as a reference, the territory of Centre-Ouest Department was composed of Haut-Sassandra Region, Gôh Region, and Nawa Region.

In 1969, Centre-Ouest Department and the other five existing departments of the country were abolished and replaced with 24 new departments. The territory of Centre-Ouest Department became the new departments of Daloa, Gagnoa, and Sassandra.
