= Sirana =

Sirana Sirana de Odienné
- Village
- Location in Ivory Coast
- Coordinates: 9°25′N 7°51′W
- Country: Ivory Coast
- District: Denguélé
- Region: Kabadougou
- Department: Odienné
- Sub-prefecture: Odienné
- Time zone: UTC+0 (GMT)

Sirana (also known as Sirana de Odienné) is a village in northwestern Ivory Coast. It is in the sub-prefecture of Odienné, Odienné Department, Kabadougou Region, Denguélé District. At the west end of the village is a border crossing with Guinea.

Sirana was a commune until March 2012, when it became one of 1,126 communes nationwide that were abolished.
