= Centre Department (Ivory Coast) =

Department of Ivory Coast (1961–1969)

Centre Department Département de Centre
- Department of Ivory Coast
- 1961–1969
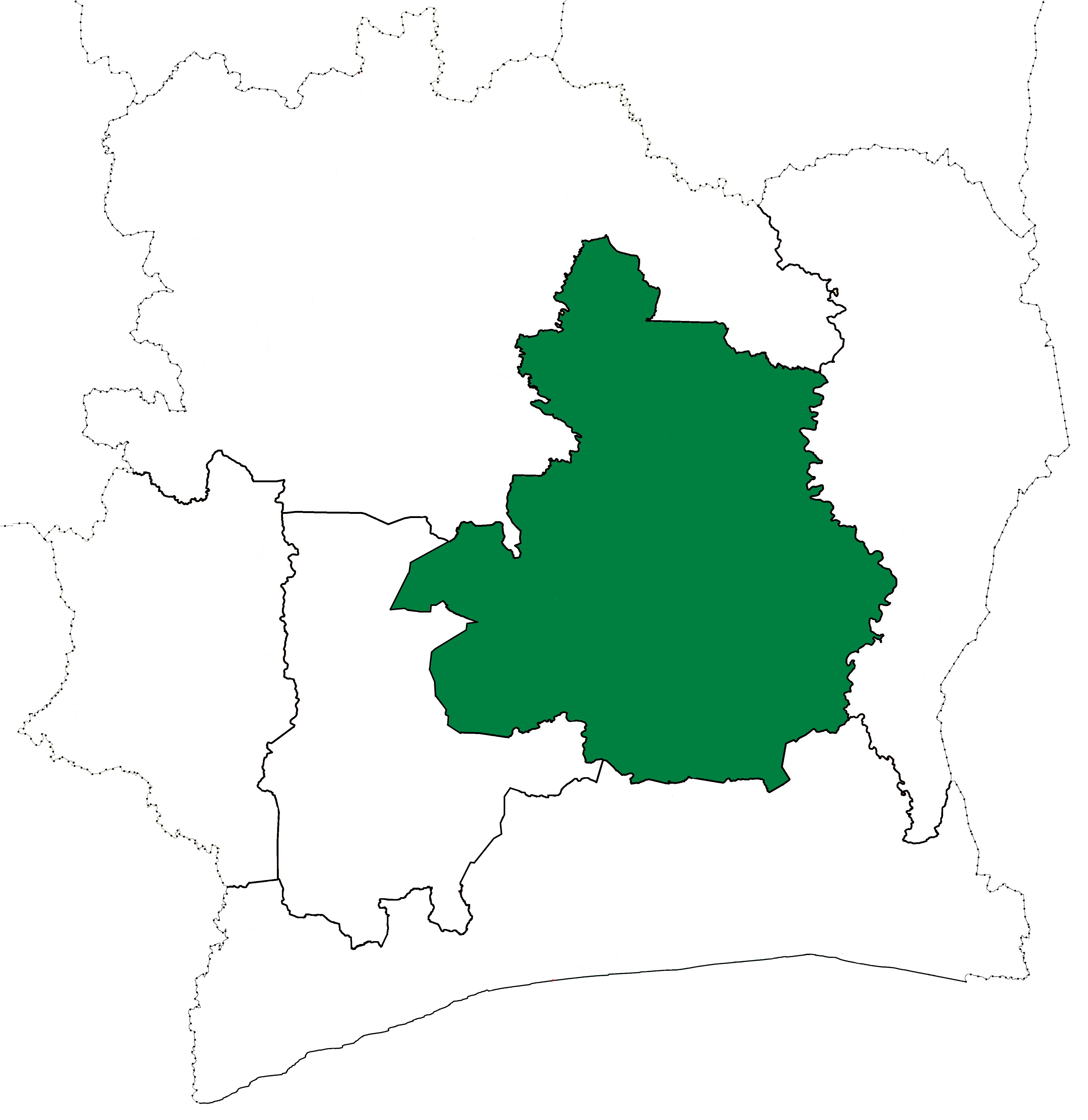
- The location of Centre Department in Ivory Coast. The boundaries of the other departments are those that existed in 1963–69.
- Capital: Bouaké
- History
  - Established as a first-level subdivision: 1961
  - Disestablished: 1969
- Today part of: Lacs, Vallée du Bandama, and Yamoussoukro Autonomous Districts; Marahoué Region

Centre Department was one of the original four departments of Ivory Coast. It was established in 1961, along with Nord Department, Sud-Est Department, and Sud-Ouest Department. During Centre Department's existence, departments were the first-level administrative subdivisions of Ivory Coast.

Using current boundaries as a reference, the territory of Centre Department was composed of Lacs District, Marahoué Region, Vallée du Bandama District, and Yamoussoukro Autonomous District.

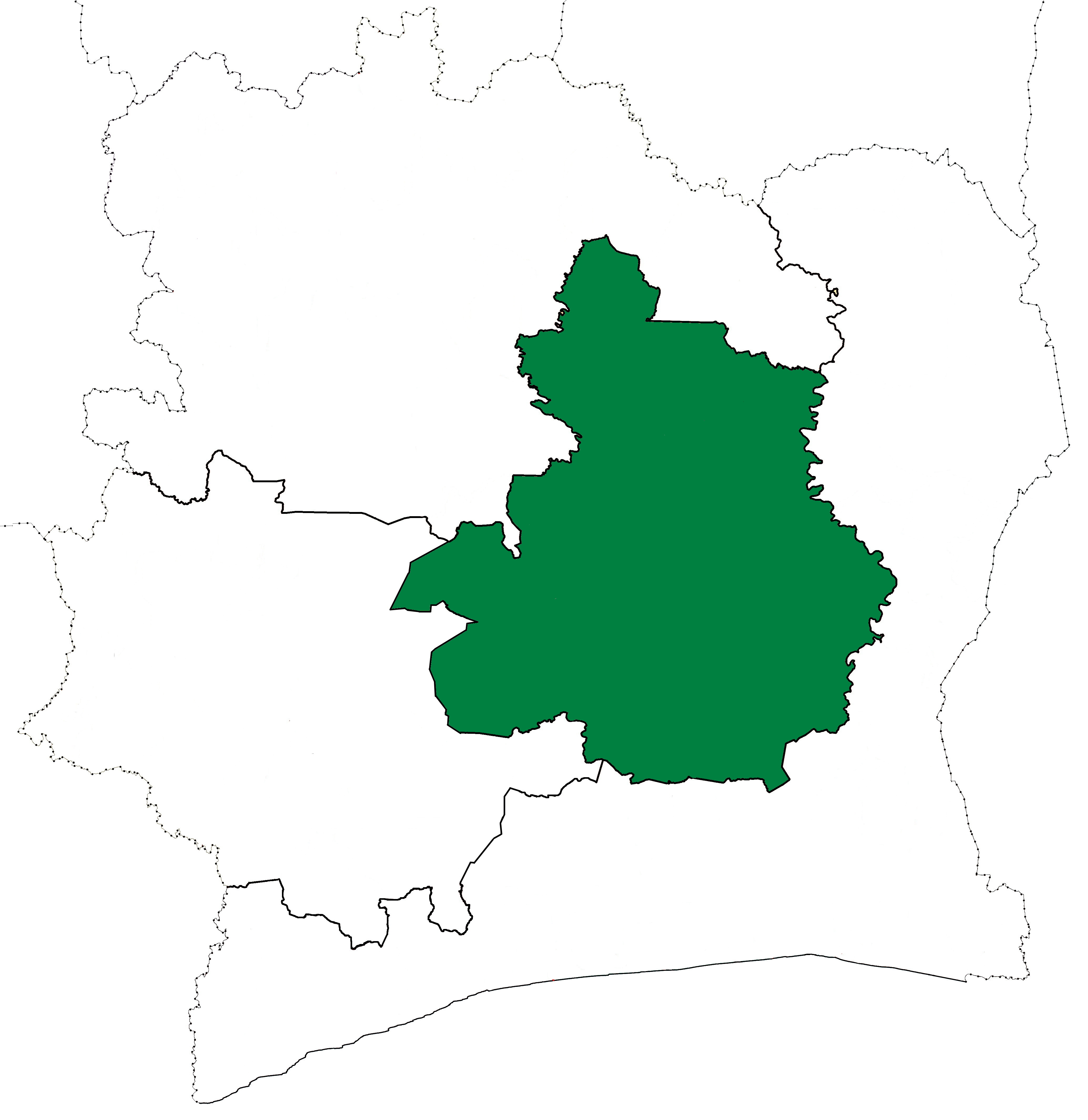
Centre Department and the other three original departments of Ivory Coast (1961–63)

In 1969, Centre Department and the other five existing departments of the country were abolished and replaced with 24 new departments. The territory of Centre Department became the new departments of Bouaflé, Bouaké, Dimbokro, and Katiola.
