= Dikodougou =

- Town, sub-prefecture, and commune
- Location in Ivory Coast
- Coordinates: 9°4′N 5°46′W
- Country: Ivory Coast
- District: Savanes
- Region: Poro
- Department: Dikodougou

Population (2014)
  - Total: 39,567
- Time zone: UTC+0 (GMT)

Dikodougou is a town in north-central Ivory Coast. It is a sub-prefecture of and the seat of Dikodougou Department in Poro Region, Savanes District. Dikodougou is also a commune.

In 2014, the population of the sub-prefecture of Dikodougou was 39,567.

== Villages ==
The 29 villages of the sub-prefecture of Dikodougou and their population in 2014 are:

1. Bana (401)
2. Diendron (149)
3. Dikodougou (13,953)
4. Kadioha (4,626)
5. Kapreme (2,549)
6. Karafine (504)
7. Karakpo (736)
8. Koulopankaha (1,243)
9. Kpele (296)
10. Namasselikaha (805)
11. Nangakaha (47)
12. Nerkene (998)
13. Nogotaha (1,148)
14. Ouamessionkaha (1,234)
15. Ouelelokaha (896)
16. Pezorolakaha (46)
17. Pindokaha (704)
18. Pleuro (2,464)
19. Poundia (238)
20. Samatiguila (652)
21. Sefon (344)
22. Seguebe (392)
23. Sionhouakaha (174)
24. Sounzorisso (1,079)
25. Tapre (976)
26. Tionrikaha (82)
27. Tolisso (224)
28. Toufinde (1,980)
29. Zangbokpo (627)
