= Guinea–Ivory Coast border =

International border

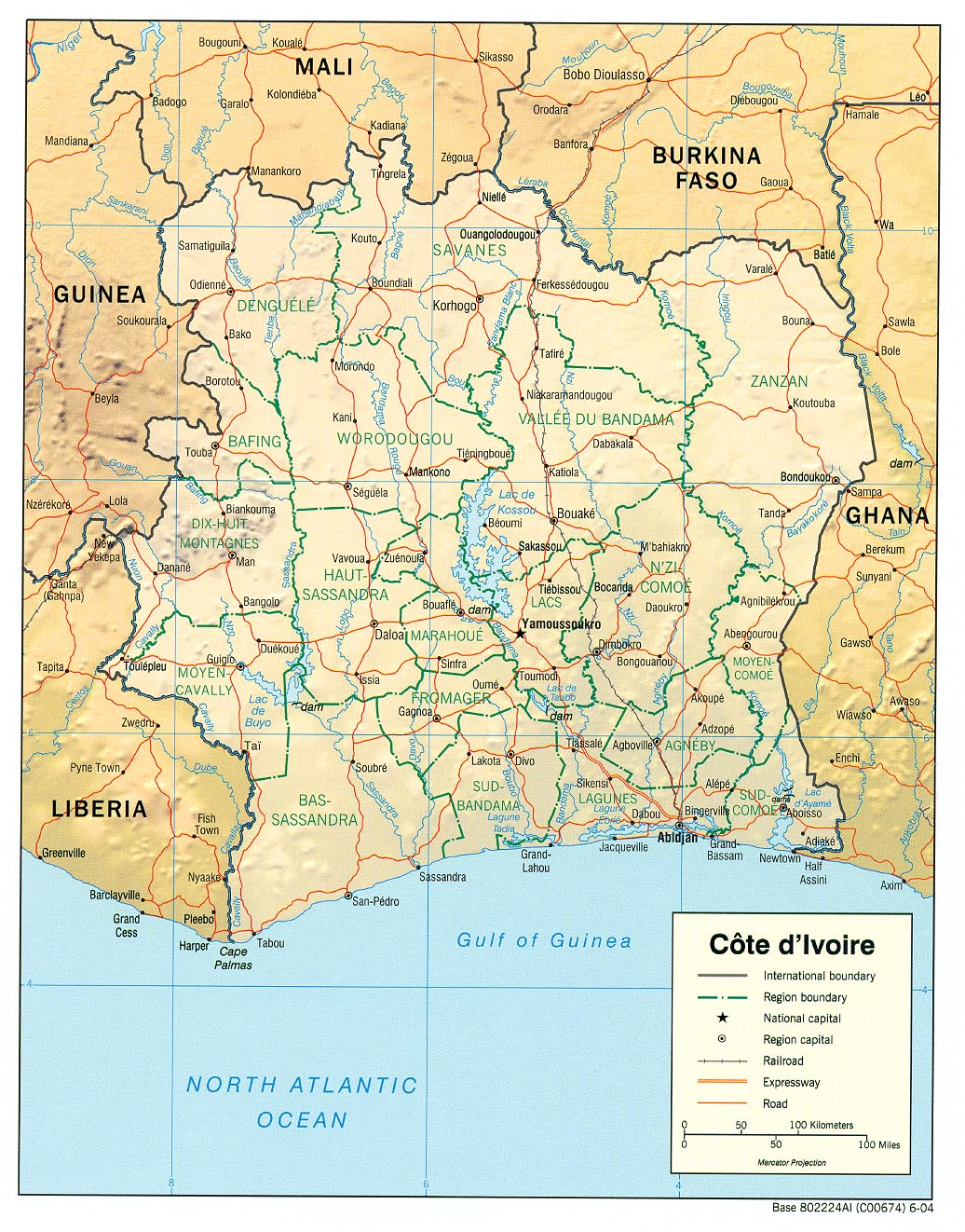
Map of Ivory Coast, with Guinea to the west

The Guinea–Ivory Coast border is 816 kilometres (507 mi) in length and runs from the tripoint with Mali in the north to the tripoint with Liberia in the south.

== Description ==
The border starts in the north at the Malian tripoint, briefly going overland to the south-west before reaching the Sankarani River. The border follows this river, then the Gbanhala, southwards, before joining the Kourou Kelle river. The border then proceeds overland to the south via a series of irregular lines, before reaching the Bagbe river, which it then follows as it flows to the west, followed by the Koure as it flows to the south. A series of irregular overland lines then connect southwards to the Liberian tripoint in the Nimba Range.

== History ==
France had begun signing treaties with chiefs along the modern Ivorian coast in the 1840s, thereby establishing a protectorate which later became the colony of Ivory Coast in 1893. France has also annexed the coast of what is now Guinea in the late 19th century as the Rivières du Sud colony. The area was renamed French Guinea 1894, and was later included within the French West Africa colony along with Ivory Coast. A border between the two was delimited by decree on 17 October 1899, with a more detailed description provided in a French arrete of 21 June 1911.

As the movement for decolonisation grew in the post-Second World War era, France gradually granted more political rights and representation for their sub-Saharan African colonies, culminating in the granting of broad internal autonomy to French West Africa in 1958 within the framework of the French Community. Guinea gained full independence in 1958, followed by Ivory Coast in 1960.

== Settlements near the border ==
=== Guinea ===
- Noumoudjiguila
- Fassiadougou
- N'Zoo

=== Ivory Coast ===
- Biramadougou
- Seydougou
- Gbéléban
- Sirana
- Bougousso
- Bako
- Niokosso
- Mahandougou
- Ngorodougou
- Touba
- Sipilou
- Zoupleu
