= Guiembé =

- Town, sub-prefecture, and commune
- Location in Ivory Coast
- Coordinates: 9°14′N 5°43′W
- Country: Ivory Coast
- District: Savanes
- Region: Poro
- Department: Dikodougou

Population (2014)
  - Total: 16,772
- Time zone: UTC+0 (GMT)

Guiembé is a town in north-central Ivory Coast. It is a sub-prefecture and commune of Dikodougou Department in Poro Region, Savanes District.

In 2014, the population of the sub-prefecture of Guiembé was 16,772.

== Villages ==
The 22 villages of the sub-prefecture of Guiembé and their population in 2014 are:

1. Bapolkaha (1 044)
2. Guiembe (5 208)
3. Kafine (628)
4. Karakpo (1 035)
5. Katiorkpo (520)
6. Katiorple (128)
7. Tiegana (1 771)
8. Feguere (149)
9. Kafiple (380)
10. Kalaha (71)
11. Karafine (301)
12. Koniehe (165)
13. Lagnonkaha (71)
14. Latamakaha (1 096)
15. Noufre (735)
16. Sokpokaha (570)
17. Soumon (232)
18. Tagbara (52)
19. Tallere (513)
20. Tape (237)
21. Trypoungo (416)
22. Zangbople (1 450)
