= Abidjan Department =

Abidjan Department Département d'Abidjan
- Department
- Location in Ivory Coast. Abidjan Department has had these boundaries since 1998. Darker shade: City of Abidjan.
- Country: Ivory Coast
- District: Abidjan
- 1969: Established as a first-level subdivision
- 1988: Divided to create Grand-Lahou and Tiassalé Depts
- 1997: Converted to a second-level subdivision
- 1998: Divided to create Alépé, Dabou, and Jacqueville Depts
- 2011: Converted to a third-level subdivision
- 2011: Transferred from Lagunes Region to Abidjan Autonomous District
- Departmental seat: Abidjan

Government
  - Prefect: Sidiki Diakité

Area
  - Total: 2,119 km^{2} (818 sq mi)

Population (2021 census)
  - Total: 6,321,017
  - Density: 2,983/km^{2} (7,726/sq mi)
- Time zone: UTC+0 (GMT)

Abidjan Department (French: Département d'Abidjan, pronounced [depaʁtəmɑ̃ d‿abidʒɑ̃]) is a department of Ivory Coast. It is the sole department in Abidjan Autonomous District, which is coextensive with the department.

== History ==
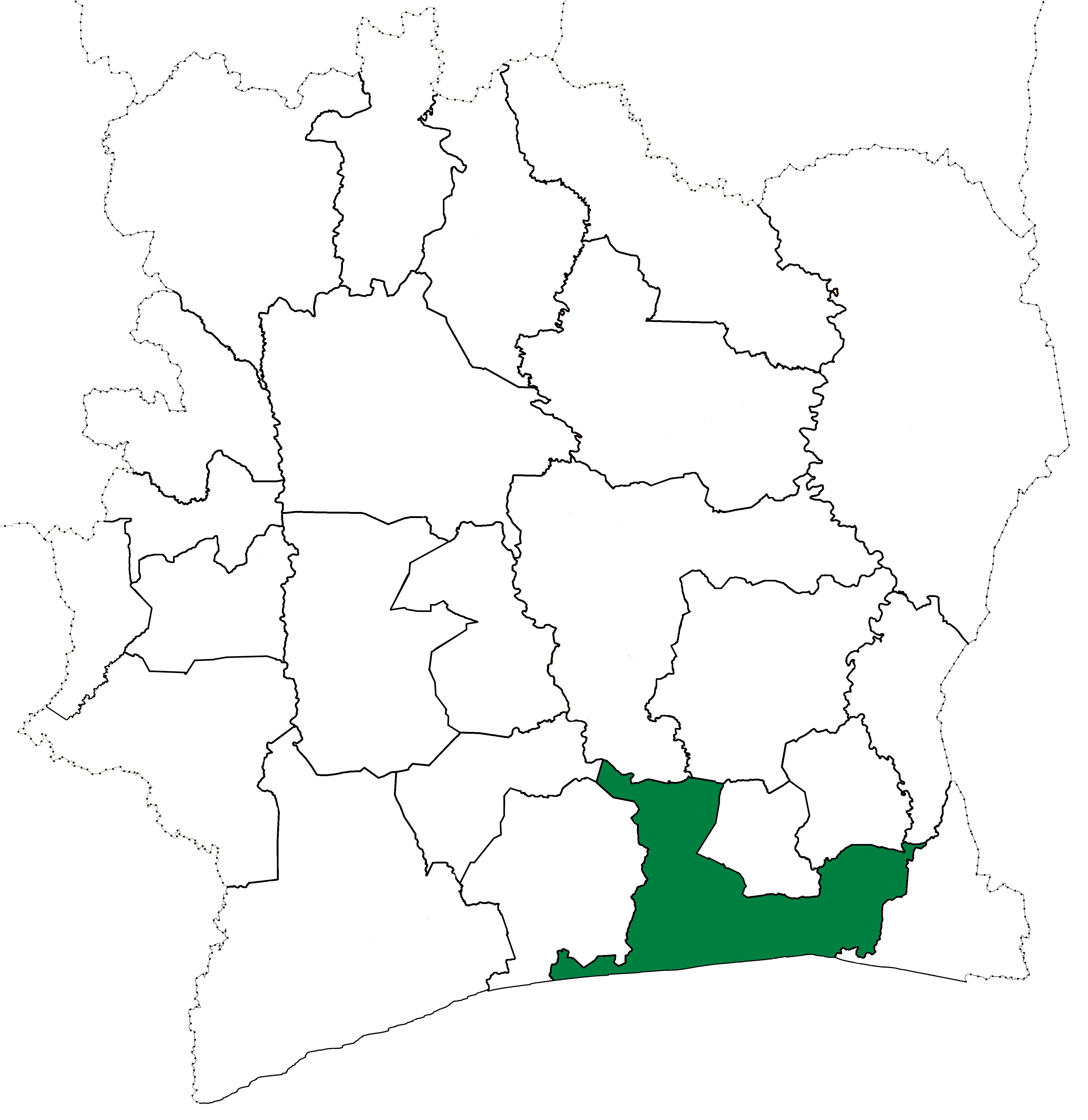
Abidjan Department upon its creation in 1969. It kept these boundaries until 1988, but other departments began to be divided in 1974.

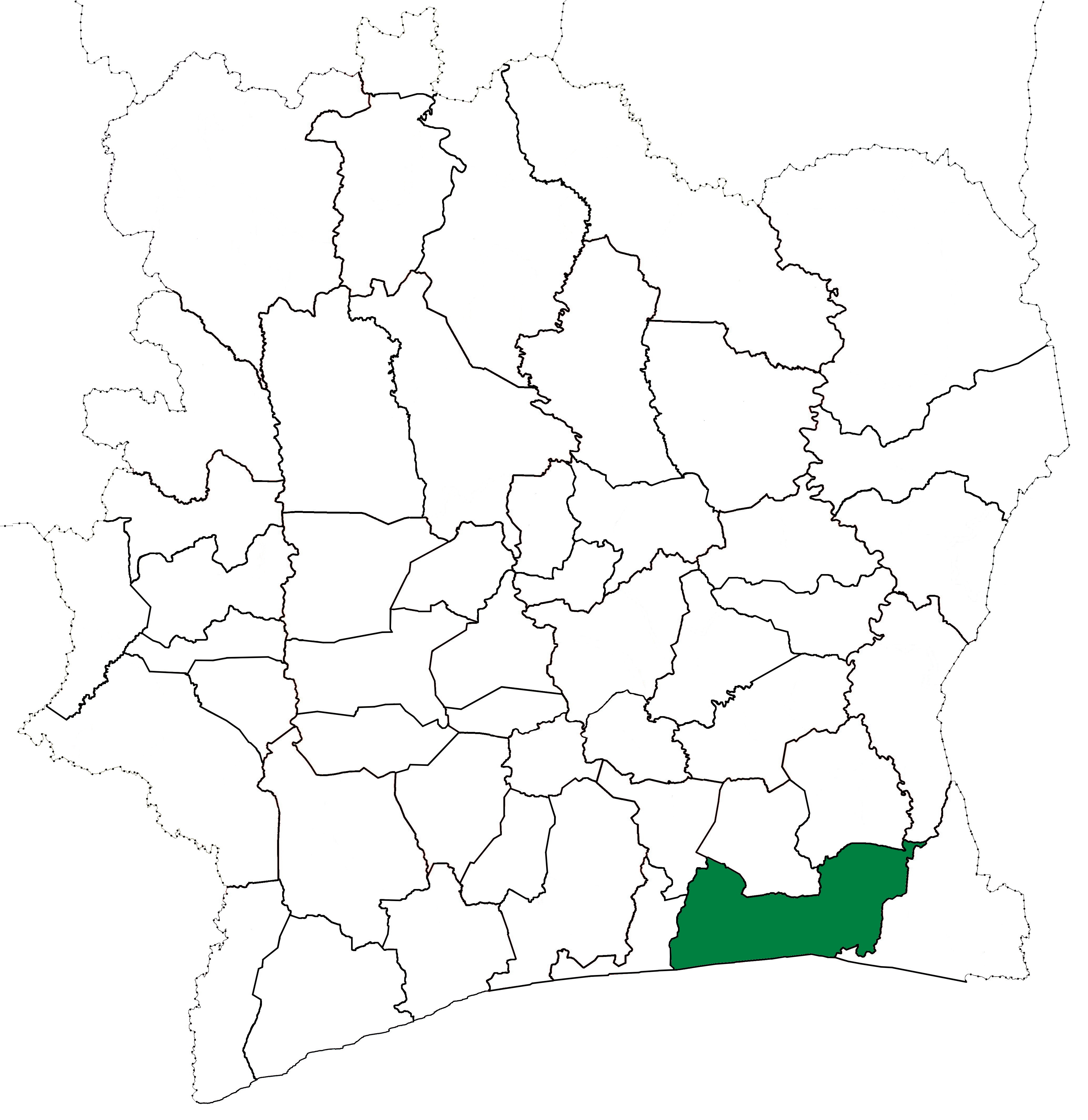
Abidjan Department from 1988 until 1998. (Other subdivision boundaries changed beginning in 1995.)

Abidjan Department was created in 1969 as one of the 24 new departments that were created to take the place of the six departments that were being abolished. It was created from territory that was formerly part of Sud Department. Using current boundaries as a reference, from 1969 to 1988 the department encompassed all of the Abidjan Autonomous District; all of Grands-Ponts Region; all of Agnéby-Tiassa Region, with the exception of Agboville Department; and Alépé Department in La Mé Region.

Abidjan Department was divided into three parts in 1988 in order to create Grand-Lahou Department and Tiassalé Department.

In 1997, regions were introduced as new first-level subdivisions of Ivory Coast; as a result, all departments were converted into second-level subdivisions. Abidjan Department was included as part of Lagunes Region. Abidjan Department was divided again in 1998 in order to create Alépé, Dabou, and Jacqueville Departments.

In 2011, districts were introduced as new first-level subdivisions of Ivory Coast. At the same time, regions were reorganised and became second-level subdivisions and all departments were converted into third-level subdivisions. At this time, Abidjan Department became part of Abidjan Autonomous District, one of two districts in the country with no regions. Abidjan Department and the Abidjan Autonomous District share the same territory.
