= Mahana Airport =

Airport in Ivory Coast

- IATA: TOZ; ICAO: DITM

Summary
- Airport type: Public
- Serves: Touba
- Elevation AMSL: 1,610 ft / 491 m
- Coordinates: 8°17′45″N 7°40′20″W

Map

Runways
Direction	Length		Surface
Direction	ft	m	Surface
05/23	5,580	1,700	Unpaved
- Source: Google Maps

Touba Airport (IATA: TOZ, ICAO: DITM) is an airport serving Touba, Côte d'Ivoire.

== See also ==
- Transport in Côte d'Ivoire
