= Koro Department =

Coordinates: 8°33′N 7°28′W

Koro Department Département de Koro
- Department
- Location in Ivory Coast. Koro Department has retained the same boundaries since its creation in 2008.
- Country: Ivory Coast
- District: Woroba
- Region: Bafing
- 2008: Established as a second-level subdivision via a division of Touba Dept
- 2011: Converted to a third-level subdivision
- Departmental seat: Koro

Government
  - Prefect: Ibrahima Cissé

Area
  - Total: 3,030 km^{2} (1,170 sq mi)

Population (2021 census)
  - Total: 76,345
  - Density: 25.2/km^{2} (65.3/sq mi)
- Time zone: UTC+0 (GMT)

Koro Department is a department of Bafing Region in Woroba District, Ivory Coast. In 2021, its population was 76,345 and its seat is the settlement of Koro. The sub-prefectures of the department are Booko, Borotou, Koro, Mahandougou, and Niokosso.

== History ==
Koro Department was created in 2008 as a second-level subdivision via a split-off from Touba Department. At its creation, it was part of Bafing Region.

In 2011, districts were introduced as new first-level subdivisions of Ivory Coast. At the same time, regions were reorganised and became second-level subdivisions and all departments were converted into third-level subdivisions. At this time, Koro Department remained part of the retained Bafing Region in the new Woroba District.
