= Ouaninou Department =

Coordinates: 8°14′N 7°52′W

Ouaninou Department Département d'Ouaninou
- Department
- Location in Ivory Coast. Ouaninou Department in dark green, Bafing region in light green.
- Country: Ivory Coast
- District: Woroba
- Region: Bafing
- 2011: Established via a division of Touba Dept
- Departmental seat: Ouaninou

Government
  - Prefect: Ballet Albert Zaouella

Area
  - Total: 2,260 km^{2} (870 sq mi)

Population (2021)
  - Total: 65,981
  - Density: 29.2/km^{2} (75.6/sq mi)
- Time zone: UTC+0 (GMT)

Ouaninou Department is a department of Bafing Region in Woroba District, Ivory Coast. In 2021, its population was 65,981 and its seat is the settlement of Ouaninou. The sub-prefectures of the department are Gbelo, Gouékan, Koonan, Ouaninou, Saboudougou, and Santa.

== History ==
Ouaninou Department was created in 2011 as part of the restructuring of the subdivisions of Ivory Coast, when departments were converted from the second-level administrative subdivisions of the country to the third-level subdivisions. It was created by splitting Touba Department.
