= Dikodougou Department =

Coordinates: 9°4′N 5°46′W

Dikodougou Department Département de Dikodougou
- Department
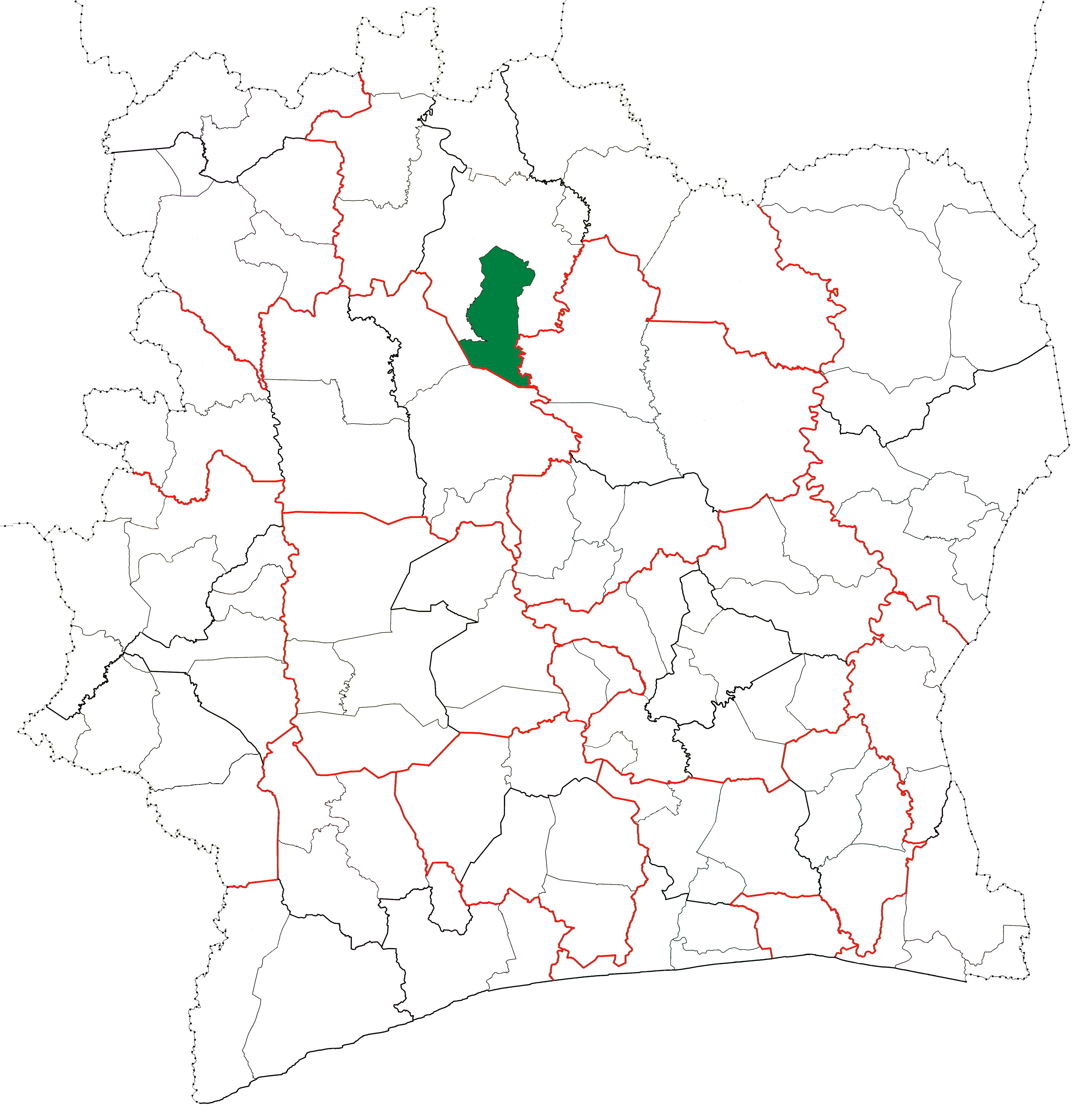
- Location in Ivory Coast. Dikodougou Department has retained the same boundaries since its creation in 2011.
- Country: Ivory Coast
- District: Savanes
- Region: Poro
- 2011: Established via a division of Korhogo Dept
- Departmental seat: Dikodougou

Government
  - Prefect: N'Dri Kouacou

Area
  - Total: 2,480 km^{2} (960 sq mi)

Population (2021 census)
  - Total: 102,115
  - Density: 41.2/km^{2} (107/sq mi)
- Time zone: UTC+0 (GMT)

Dikodougou Department is a department of Poro Region in Savanes District, Ivory Coast. In 2021, its population was 102,115 and its seat is the settlement of Dikodougou. The sub-prefectures of the department are Boron, Dikodougou and Guiembé.

== History ==
Dikodougou Department was created in 2011 as part of the restructuring of the subdivisions of Ivory Coast, when departments were converted from the second-level administrative subdivisions of the country to the third-level subdivisions. It was created by splitting Korhogo Department.
