= Touba Department =

Coordinates: 8°16′N 7°41′W

Touba Department Département de Touba
- Department
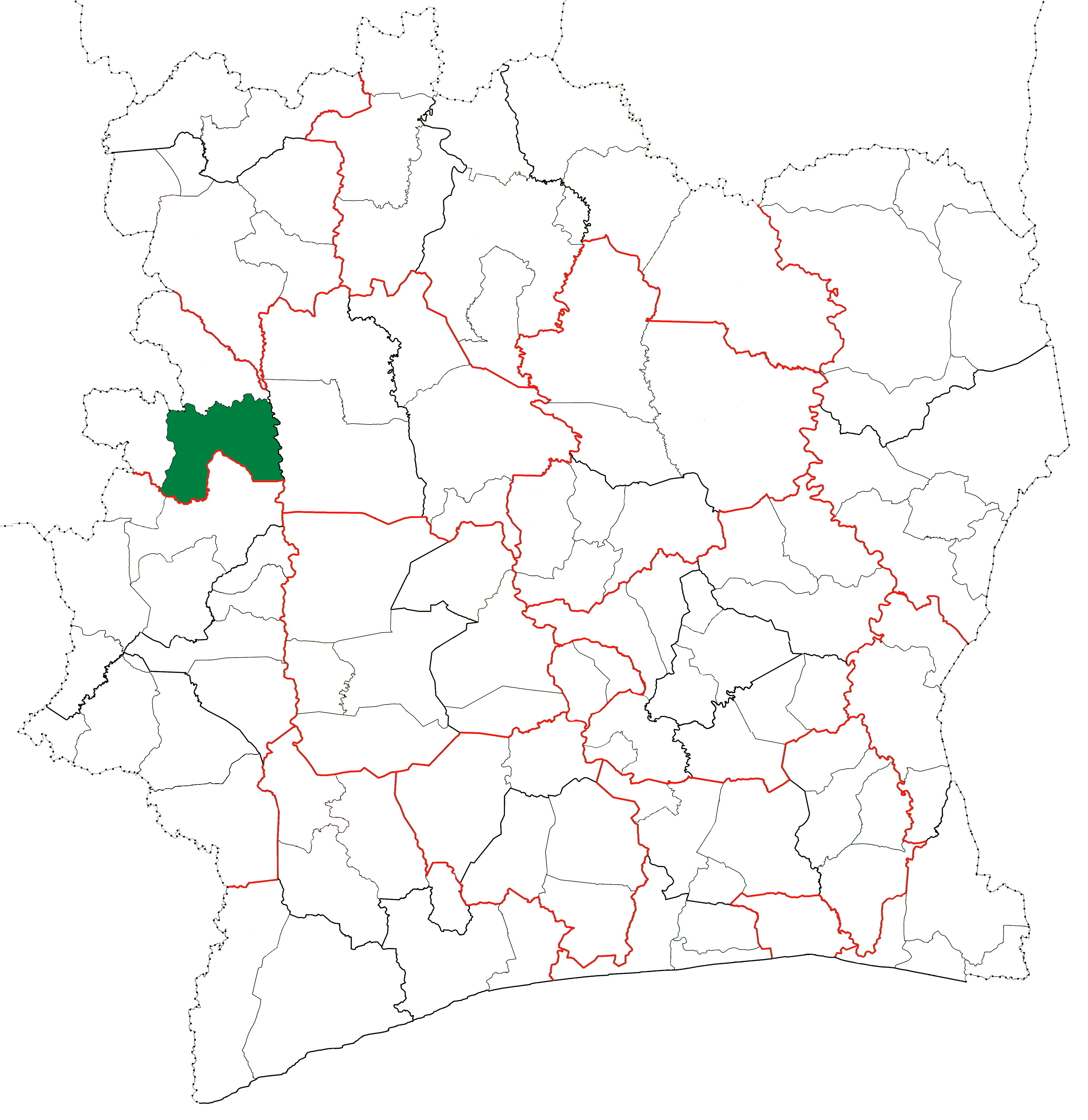
- Location in Ivory Coast. Touba Department has had these boundaries since 2011.
- Country: Ivory Coast
- District: Woroba
- Region: Bafing
- 1969: Established as a first-level subdivision
- 1997: Converted to a second-level subdivision
- 2000: Transferred to the new Bafing Region
- 2008: Divided to create Koro Dept
- 2011: Converted to a third-level subdivision
- 2011: Divided to create Ouaninou Dept
- Departmental seat: Touba

Government
  - Prefect: Benoît Yao Kouakou

Area
  - Total: 3,370 km^{2} (1,300 sq mi)

Population (2021 census)
  - Total: 120,524
  - Density: 35.8/km^{2} (92.6/sq mi)
- Time zone: UTC+0 (GMT)

Touba Department is a department of Bafing Region in Woroba District, Ivory Coast. In 2021, its population was 120,524 and its seat is the settlement of Touba. The sub-prefectures of the department are Dioman, Foungbesso, Guintéguéla, and Touba.

== History ==
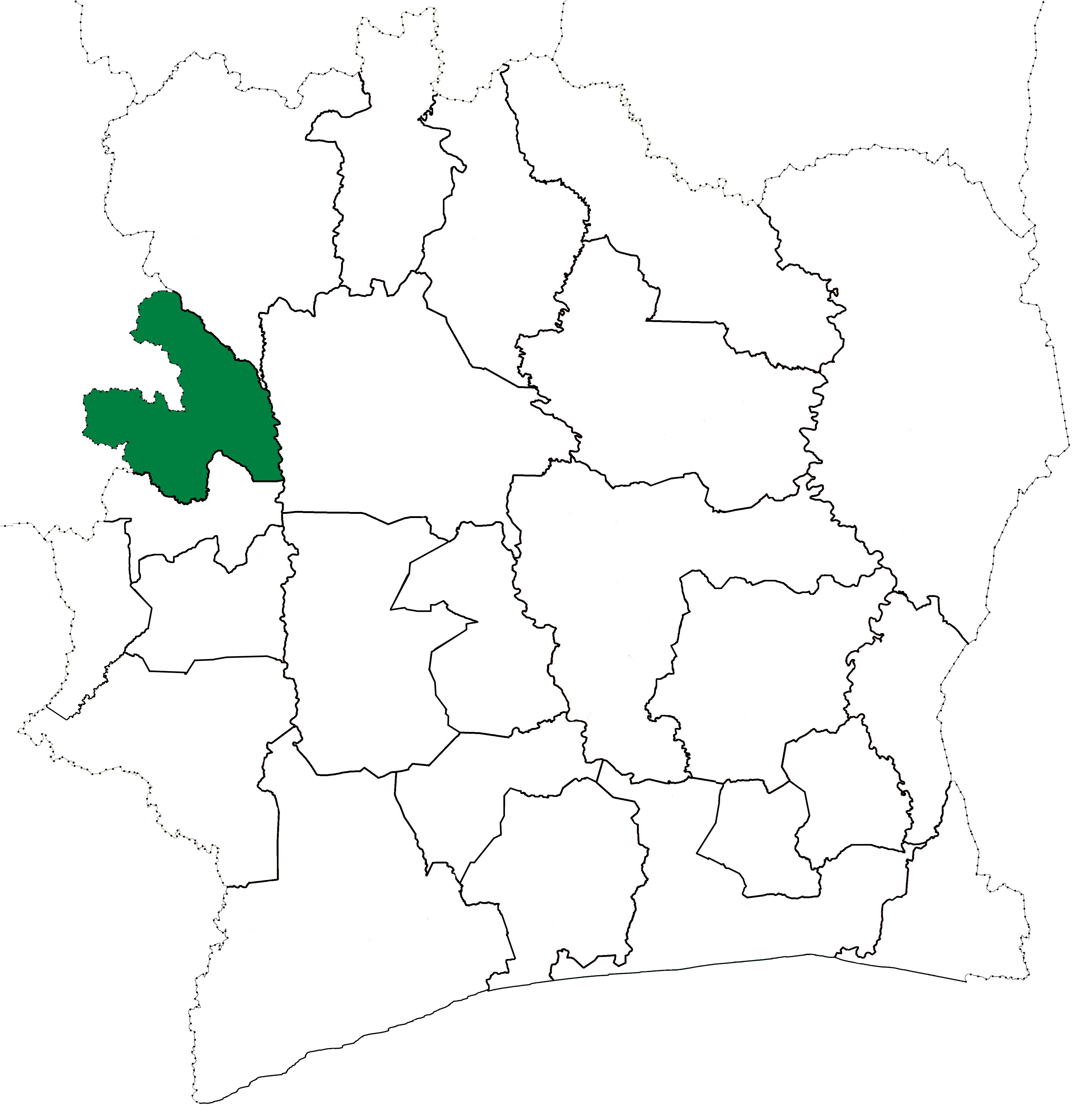
Touba Department upon its creation in 1969. It kept these boundaries until 2008, but other departments began to be divided in 1974.

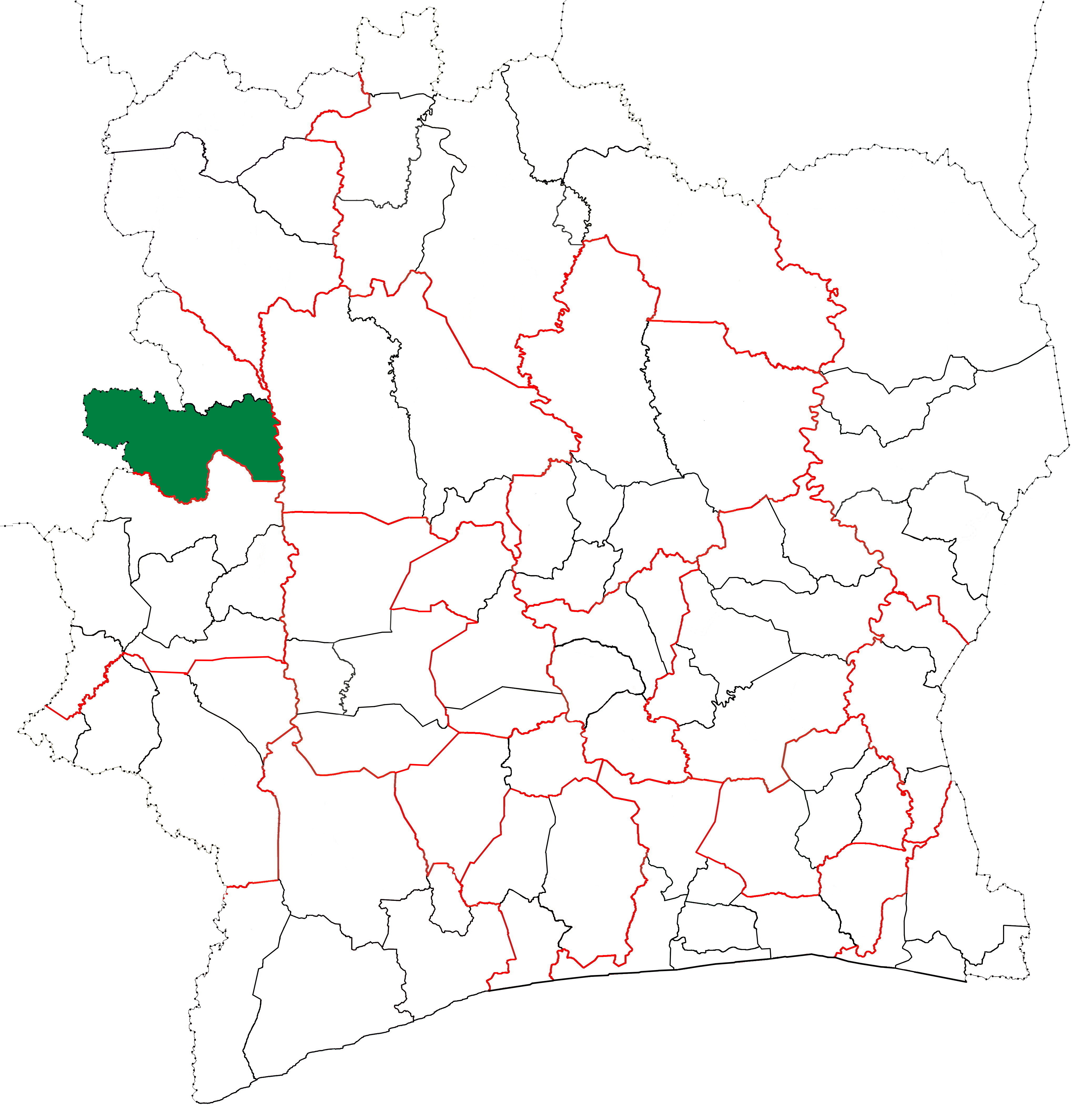
Touba Department from 2008 to 2011. (Other subdivision boundaries began to change in 2009.)

Touba Department was created in 1969 as one of the 24 new departments that were created to take the place of the six departments that were being abolished. It was created from territory that was formerly part of Nord Department. Using current boundaries as a reference, from 1969 to 2008 the department occupied the territory that is Bafing Region.

In 1997, regions were introduced as new first-level subdivisions of Ivory Coast; as a result, all departments were converted into second-level subdivisions. Touba Department was initially included as part of Worodougou Region, but in 2000 Touba Department was placed in the newly formed Bafing Region. From 2000 to 2008, Touba Department was the sole department of Bafing Region.

Touba Department was split in 2008 to create Koro Department and again in 2011 to create Ouaninou Department.

In 2011, districts were introduced as new first-level subdivisions of Ivory Coast. At the same time, regions were reorganised and became second-level subdivisions and all departments were converted into third-level subdivisions. At this time, Touba Department remained part of the retained Bafing Region in the new Woroba District.
