= Subdivisions of Ivory Coast =

Governance arrangements

Districts of Ivory Coast, the highest-level subdivision

Ivory Coast (Côte d'Ivoire) is a relatively decentralised state. The country divided into 14 districts, of which two are cities organised as autonomous districts. The other 12 districts are subdivided into 31 second-level regions. The autonomous districts and the regions are divided into 111 third-level departments. The departments are divided into 510 fourth-level sub-prefectures. Sub-prefectures contain villages and, in some instances, several villages are combined into fifth-level communes. There are 197 communes.

== History ==
Independent Ivory Coast was first divided into administrative subdivisions in 1961, when four departments were created. In 1963, two additional departments were created, and in 1969, the six departments were reorganised into 24. Over the years, the departments continued to divide as the population grew until there were 50 by 1995.

In 1997, a comprehensive system of multiple administrative levels was created for the first time. Sixteen regions were created as new first-level subdivisions; each region contained two or more departments, which became the second-level administrative subdivisions. In 2000, three more regions were created.

By 2011, there were 90 second-level departments within the 19 first-level regions of Ivory Coast.

In 1978, 28 communes had been created, and many more were created in the years following. However, the communes were not organised as a systematic administrative level covering all portions of the country until 1997, when they became the national third-level subdivisions. By 2011, the departments were divided into over 1300 communes.

=== 2011 decentralisation reorganisation ===
In 2011, Ivory Coast instituted a reorganisation of its subdivisions with the goal of further decentralising the state. Immediately prior to the reorganisation, the country was divided into 19 first-level regions, 90 second-level departments, and more than 1300 third-level communes.

The reorganisation was implemented in September 2011. First, 14 districts were created, which replaced regions as the first-level subdivision of the country. Some of the new districts had the same boundaries and names as some of the old regions, but overall the number of first-level subdivisions was decreased from 19 to 14. Second, the number of regions was increased to 30, and they were converted into second-level subdivisions. Third, the departments were reorganised, with the number being increased from 90 to 95; they were converted into third-level subdivisions. Fourth, 498 sub-prefectures were created as new fourth-level subdivisions. The more than 1300 communes were retained, but they were converted from third-level subdivisions into fifth-level subdivisions. In March 2012, the number of communes was drastically reduced to 197 on the grounds that in many cases, they were now an economically unfeasible level of government. As was the case prior to 1997, today not all areas of the country are divided into communes.

Since the 2011 reorganisation, one additional region has been created, bringing the total to 31. Thirteen more departments have been created, bringing the total to 108. Twelve new sub-prefectures have been created, bringing the total to 510. The number of communes remains 197.

In 2014, the districts were abolished except for Abidjan and Yamoussoukro. Then in 2021 the former districts were reinstated as autonomous districts.

The two autonomous districts of Abidjan and Yamoussoukro are not subdivided into regions, but they do contain departments, sub-prefectures, and communes.

== Maps of current subdivisions ==
Districts (first-level)

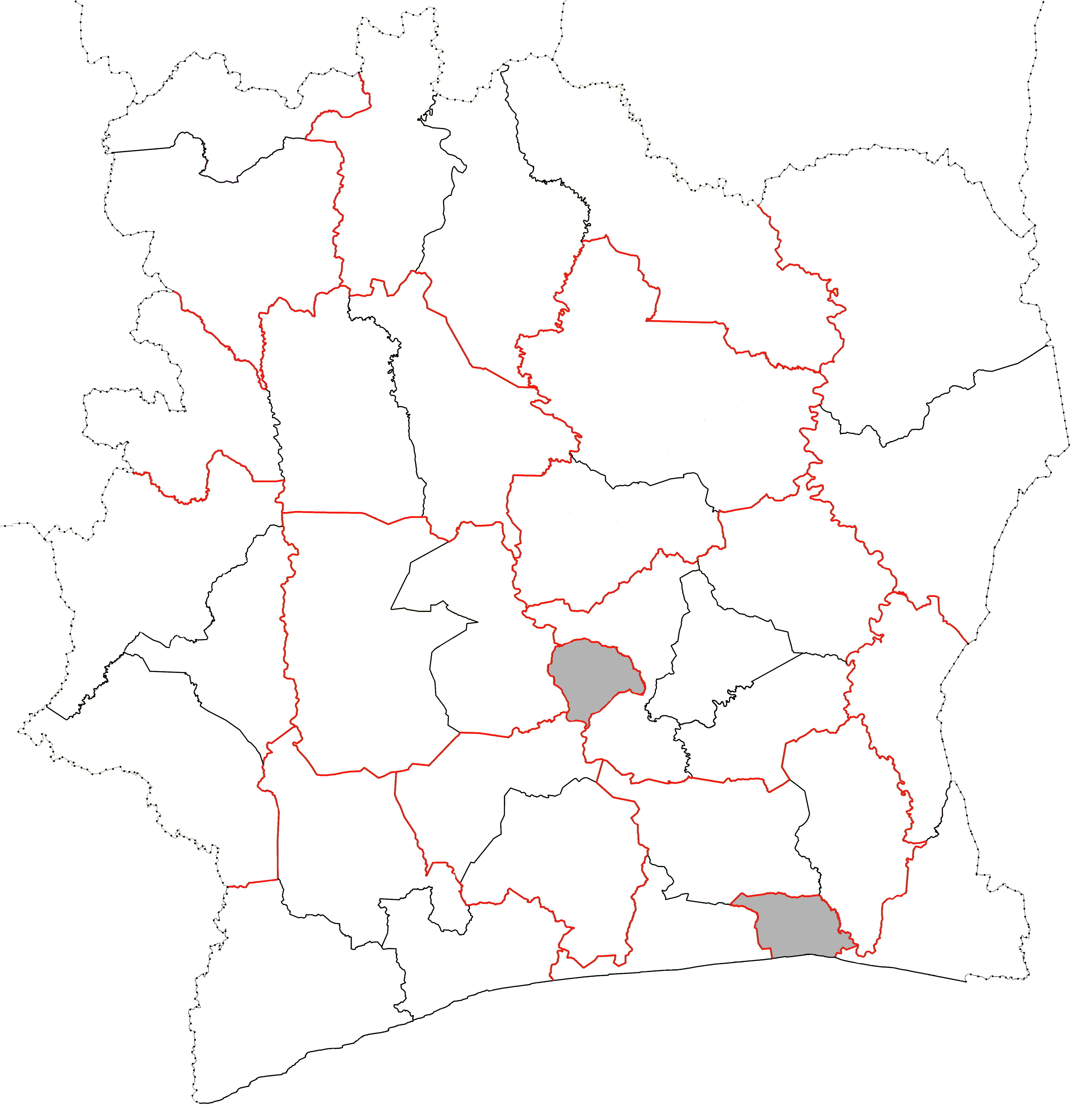
Regions (second-level)

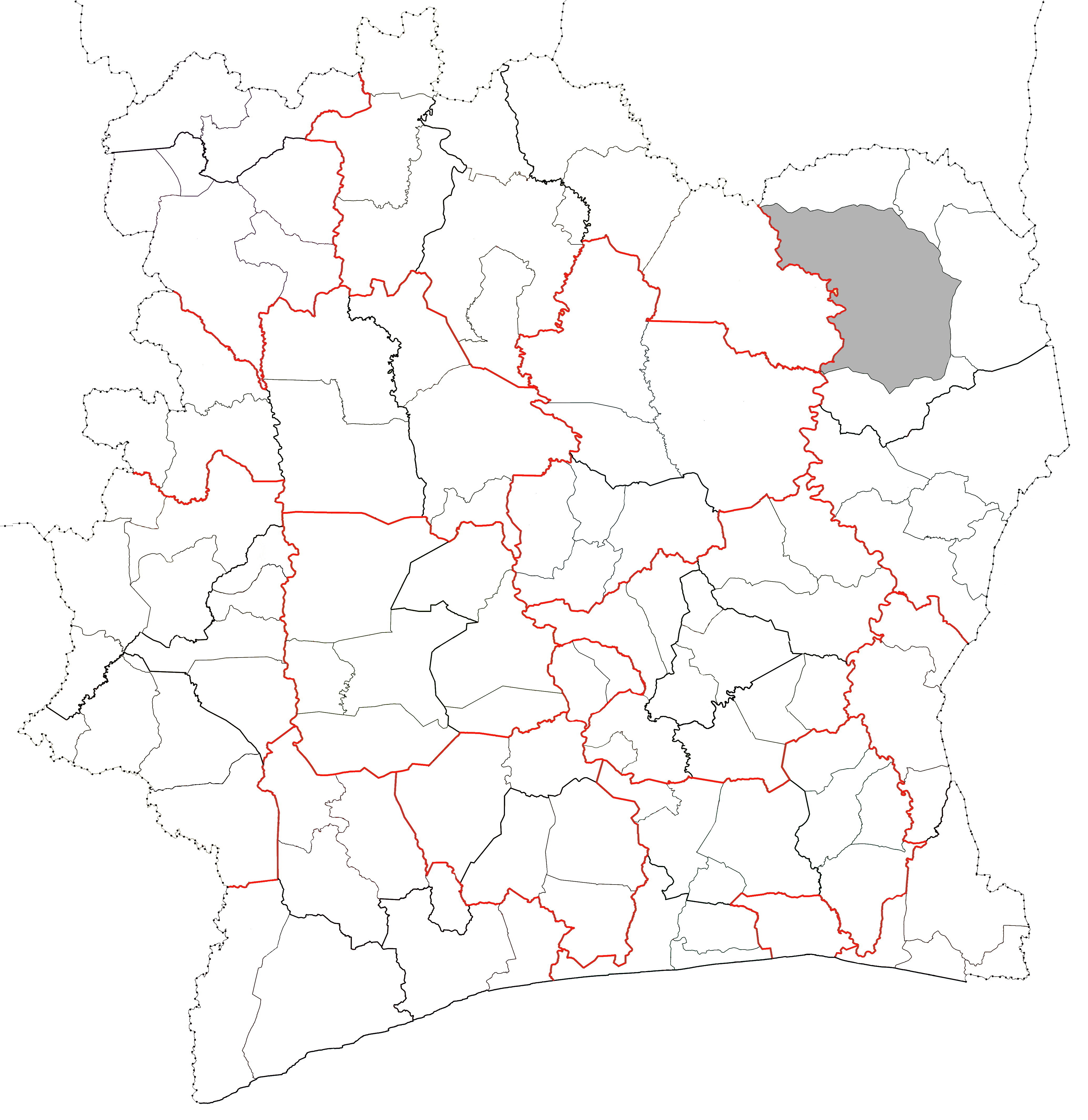
Departments (third-level)

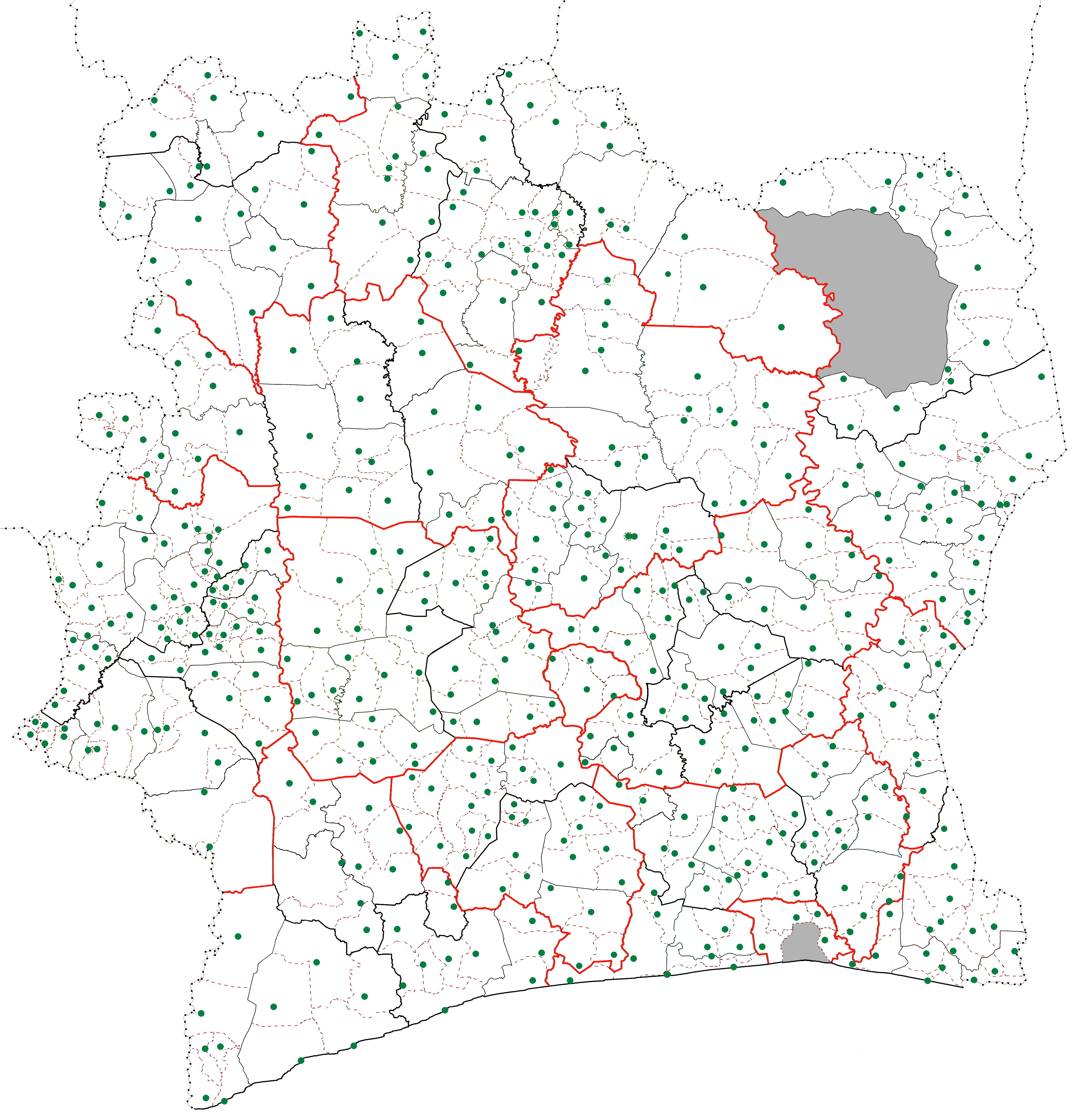
Sub-prefectures (fourth-level)

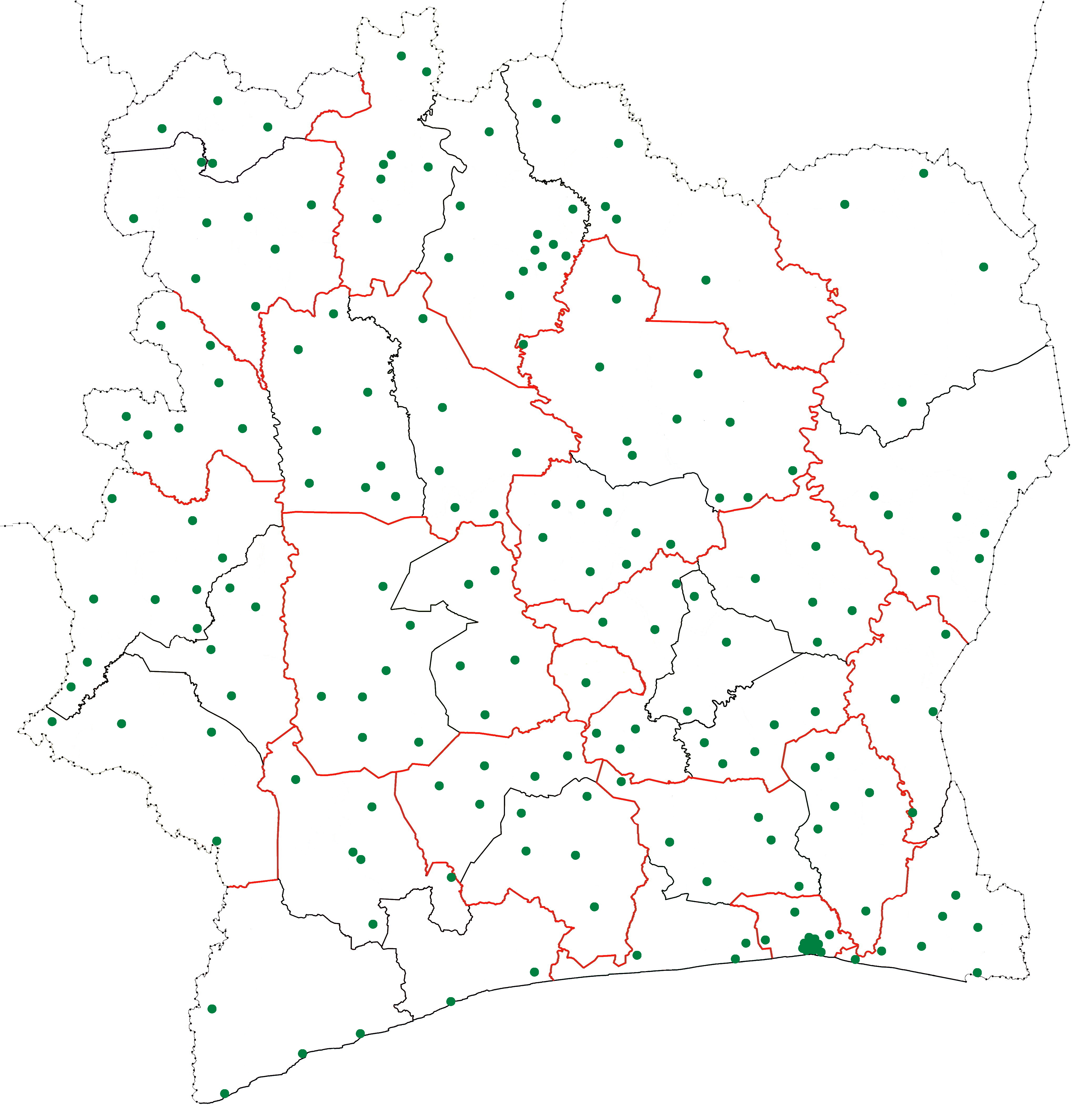
Communes (fifth-level but implemented sparingly)

== Maps of subdivisions through time ==
| Map | Years effective | First-level subdivisions | Second-level subdivisions | Third-level subdivisions | Changes |
|---|---|---|---|---|---|
| | 1961–63 | 4 departments | — | — | Four departments created as first-level subdivisions. |
| | 1963–69 | 6 departments | — | — | Two departments added. |
| | 1969–74 | 24 departments | — | — | All previous departments abolished. 24 new departments established as first-level subdivisions. |
| | 1974–80 | 26 departments | — | — | Two departments added. |
| | 1980–88 | 34 departments | — | — | Eight departments added. |
| | 1988–95 | 49 departments | — | — | 15 departments added. |
| | 1995–97 | 50 departments | — | — | One department added. |
| | 1997–98 | 16 regions | 50 departments | — | 16 regions created as new first-level subdivisions. Departments converted to second-level subdivisions. |
| | 1998–2000 | 16 regions | 58 departments | — | Eight departments added. |
| | 2000–05 | 19 regions | 58 departments | — | Three regions added. |
| | 2005–08 | 19 regions | 70 departments | — | 12 departments added. |
| | 2008–09 | 19 regions | 81 departments | — | 11 departments added. |
| | 2009–11 | 19 regions | 90 departments | — | 9 departments added. |
| | 2011–12 | 14 districts | 30 regions | 95 departments | 14 districts created as new first-level subdivisions. Regions increased to 30 and converted to second-level subdivisions. Departments converted to third-level subdivisions. Five departments added. Two areas removed from regional jurisdiction. One area removed from departmental jurisdiction. |
| | 2012–13 | 14 districts | 31 regions | 107 departments | One region added. 12 departments added. |
| | 2013– | 14 districts | 31 regions | 108 departments | One department added. |
