= Bafing Region =

Coordinates: 8°30′N 7°30′W

Bafing Region Région du Bafing
- Region
- Motto: "La Renaissance du Bafing"
- Location of Bafing Region (dark red) in Ivory Coast
- Country: Ivory Coast
- District: Woroba
- 2000: Established as a first-level subdivision via division of Worodougou Region
- 2011: Converted to a second-level subdivision
- Regional seat: Touba

Government
  - Prefect: Benoît Yao Kouakou
  - Council President: Diomande Lassina

Area
  - Total: 8,660 km^{2} (3,340 sq mi)

Population (2021)
  - Total: 262,850
  - Density: 30.4/km^{2} (78.6/sq mi)
- Time zone: UTC+0 (GMT)

Bafing Region is one of the 31 regions of Ivory Coast and is part of Woroba District. The region's seat is Touba. The region's area is 8,660 km^{2}, and its population in the 2021 census was 262,850.

== Departments and geography ==
Bafing Region is currently divided into three departments: Koro, Ouaninou, and Touba. The region is traversed by a northwesterly line of equal latitude and longitude.

== History ==
Bafing Region was created in 2000 as a first-level administration region of the country. It was formed by splitting-off Touba Department from Worodougou Region. Koro Department was created as a split-off from Touba Department in 2008.

As part of the 2011 reorganisation of the subdivisions of Ivory Coast, Bafing was converted into a second-level administrative region and was added to the new first-level Woroba District. No territorial changes were made to Bafing as a result of the reorganisation, but a third department—Ouaninou Department—was created by splitting Touba Department again.

== Demographic change ==
Historical population

Year	Pop.	±%
1988	107,886	—
1998	148,813	+37.9%

Year	Pop.	±%
2010	205,339	+38.0%
2014	183,047	−10.9%
