= Woroba District =

District of Ivory Coast

Coordinates: 8°29′N 6°36′W

Woroba District District du Woroba
- District
- Country: Ivory Coast
- Established: 2011
- Capital: Séguéla

Area
  - Total: 31,100 km^{2} (12,000 sq mi)

Population (2021)
  - Total: 1,184,813
  - Density: 38.1/km^{2} (98.7/sq mi)
- ISO 3166 code: CI-WR
- HDI (2022): 0.423 low · 14th of 14

Woroba District (French: District du Woroba) is one of 14 administrative districts of Ivory Coast. It is in the northwest part of the country. Its capital is Séguéla.

== Creation ==
Woroba District was created in a 2011 administrative reorganisation of the subdivisions of Ivory Coast. The territory of the district was composed by merging the regions of Bafing and Worodougou.

== Administrative divisions ==
Woroba District is currently subdivided into three regions and the following departments:

- Bafing Region (region seat in Touba)
  - Koro Department
  - Touba Department
  - Ouaninou Department
- Béré Region (region seat in Mankono)
  - Kounahiri Department
  - Mankono Department
  - Dianra Department
- Worodougou Region (region seat also in Séguéla)
  - Séguéla Department
  - Kani Department

== Population ==
According to the 2021 census, Woroba District has a population of 1,184,813, making it the third least populous district in Ivory Coast, behind Yamoussoukro Autonomous District and Denguélé District.

=== Religion ===
Religion in Woroba (2021 census)
Religion	Percent
Islam	70.5%
Christianity	12.9%
None	10.6%
Traditional	3.8%
Other	2.2%

According to the 2021 census, the largest religion in Woroba is Islam, practised by 70.5% of the total population. Christians represent 12.9% of the district's population, followed by those with no religion at 10.6% and adherents of traditional religions at 3.8%.

== Villages ==
- Trafesso
