= Departments of Ivory Coast =

Third-level administrative subdivision of the country

Departments of Ivory Coast. Colours indicate regions and autonomous districts

Departments of Ivory Coast (French: départements de Côte d'Ivoire) are currently the third-level administrative subdivision of the country. Each of the 31 second-level regions of Ivory Coast is divided into two or more departments. (The autonomous districts are containing departments, but have a specific status.) Each department is divided into two or more sub-prefectures. Since 2020, there are 111 departments of Ivory Coast.

Departments were first created in 1959. During their existence, they have been first-, second-, and third-level administrative subdivisions.

== Current departments ==

There are currently 111 departments of Ivory Coast. The departments are as follows:

1. Abengourou
2. Abidjan
3. Aboisso
4. Adzopé
5. Agboville
6. Agnibilékrou
7. Bangolo
8. Béoumi
9. Biankouma
10. Bondoukou
11. Bongouanou
12. Bouaflé
13. Bouaké
14. Bouna
15. Boundiali
16. Dabakala
17. Daloa
18. Danané
19. Daoukro
20. Dimbokro
21. Divo
22. Duékoué
23. Ferkessédougou
24. Gagnoa
25. Grand-Lahou
26. Guiglo
27. Issia
28. Katiola
29. Korhogo
30. Lakota
31. Man
32. Mankono
33. M’Bahiakro
34. Odienné
35. Oumé
36. Sakassou
37. San-Pedro
38. Sassandra
39. Séguéla
40. Sinfra
41. Soubré
42. Tabou
43. Transua
44. Tengréla
45. Tiassalé
46. Touba
47. Toumodi
48. Vavoua
49. Yamoussoukro
50. Zuénoula
51. Adiaké
52. Alépé
53. Bocanda
54. Dabou
55. Grand-Bassam
56. Jacqueville
57. Tiébissou
58. Toulépleu
59. Bloléquin
60. Akoupé
61. Didiévi
62. Kouibly
63. Nassian
64. Prikro
65. Sikensi
66. Zouan-Hounien
67. Madinani
68. Minignan
69. Kounahiri
70. Koun-Fao
71. Arrah
72. Attiégouakro
73. Bettié
74. Botro
75. Dikodougou
76. Doropo
77. Fresco
78. Guéyo
79. Guitry
80. Kani
81. Kaniasso
82. Koro
83. Kouto
84. M’Batto
85. Niakaramadougou
86. Ouangolodougou
87. Ouaninou
88. Samatiguila
89. Sandégué
90. Sinématiali
91. Téhini
92. Tiapoum
93. Tanda
94. Yakassé-Attobrou
95. Zoukougbeu
96. Buyo
97. Dianra
98. Djékanou
99. Facobly
100. Gbéléban
101. Kong
102. Kouassi-Kouassikro
103. M’Bengué
104. Méagui
105. Séguélon
106. Sipilou
107. Taabo
108. Taï
109. Ouellé
110. Bonon
111. Gohitafla

== History ==
=== 1961–69 ===
Departments of Ivory Coast in 1961–63.

Departments of Ivory Coast in 1963–69.

Departments were established in 1961 and were the original first-level administrative subdivision of independent Ivory Coast. Initially, there were just four departments: Centre, Nord, Sud-Est, and Sud-Ouest. In 1963, two more departments were created: Est was created by dividing Sud-Est, and Centre-Ouest) was created by dividing Sud-Ouest. As a result of the divisions, Sud-Est was renamed Sud and Sud-Ouest was renamed Ouest.

=== 1969: 24 new departments ===
In 1969, the six departments were abolished and in their place 24 new departments were created. The following table illustrates how the old departments were divided into the new departments:

The 24 new departments that were created in 1969 (in background the 6 former departments). These boundaries were consistent until departments began to be divided in 1974.

Old department	New departments (number corresponds to position on map)
Centre	Bouaflé (8), Bouaké (9), Dimbokro (13), Katiola (18)
Centre-Ouest	Daloa (11), Gagnoa (16), Sassandra (22)
Est	Abengourou (1), Bondoukou (7)
Nord	Boundiali (10), Ferkessédougou (15), Korhogo (19), Odienné (21), Séguéla (23), Touba (24)
Ouest	Biankouma (6), Danané (12), Guiglo (17), Man (20)
Sud	Abidjan (2), Aboisso (3), Adzopé (4), Agboville (5), Divo (14), Sassandra (22)

Due to a lack of government resources, the 1969 changes were not fully implemented until 1974.

=== Subsequent divisions and relegation to second-level ===
From 1974 onward, new departments were occasionally created through division of pre-existing departments. New departments were created in 1974 (2), 1980 (8), 1988 (15), and 1995 (1). In 1997, when there were 50 departments, regions were created, which supplanted departments as the first-level administrative subdivision. As a result, the 50 departments became second-level divisions.

More departments were created in 1998 (8), 2005 (12), 2008 (11), and 2009 (9). By the time of the late-2011 reorganisation of the subdivisions of Ivory Coast, there were 90 departments in 19 regions.

=== 2011 subdivision reorganisation ===
In the 2011 reorganisation of the subdivisions of Ivory Coast, five new departments were created, bringing the total to 95. More significantly, however, districts were created as a new first-level division. As a result, regions became second-level subdivisions and the 95 departments became third-level subdivisions.

=== Post-2011 changes ===
Since the 2011 reorganisation, 16 more departments have been created, bringing the total number to 109. Twelve departments were created in 2012, one in 2013, and three were created in 2020.

== Names and governance ==
Departments are named after the city or town that serves as the seat of the department. In most cases, this is the most populous settlement in the department.

Each department is headed by a prefect, who is appointed by the council of ministers (cabinet) of the national government. For departments that house regional capitals, the prefect of the department is the same individual as the prefect of the region, though the two offices of prefect remain distinct.

Each department is divided into two or more sub-prefectures, which serve as fourth-level administrative subdivisions. There are currently 510 sub-prefectures in the country.

== Current departments by district and region ==
Below are the departments divided by district and region with the establishment year of the departments in parentheses.

=== Abidjan Autonomous District ===
- Abidjan Department (1969)

=== Bas-Sassandra District ===
Gbôklé Region

- Fresco Department (2008)
- Sassandra Department (1969)

Nawa Region

- Buyo Department (2012)
- Guéyo Department (2008)
- Méagui Department (2012)
- Soubré Department (1980)

San-Pédro Region

- San-Pédro Department (1988)
- Tabou Department (1988)

=== Comoé District ===
Indénié-Djuablin Region

- Abengourou Department (1969)
- Agnibilékrou Department (1995)
- Bettié Department (2008)

Sud-Comoé Region

- Aboisso Department (1969)
- Adiaké Department (1998)
- Grand-Bassam Department (1998)
- Tiapoum Department (2008)

=== Denguélé District ===
Folon Region

- Kaniasso Department (2011)
- Minignan Department (2005)

Kabadougou Region

- Gbéléban Department (2012)
- Madinani Department (2005)
- Odienné Department (1969)
- Samatiguila Department (2009)
- Séguélon Department (2012)

=== Gôh-Djiboua District ===
Gôh Region

- Gagnoa Department (1969)
- Oumé Department (1980)

Lôh-Djiboua Region

- Divo Department (1969)
- Guitry Department (2009)
- Lakota Department (1980)

=== Lacs District ===
Bélier Region

- Didiévi Department (2005)
- Djékanou Department (2012)
- Tiébissou Department (1998)
- Toumodi Department (1988)

Iffou Region

- Daoukro Department (1988)
- M'Bahiakro Department (1988)
- Ouellé Department (2020)
- Prikro Department (2005)

Moronou Region

- Arrah Department (2009)
- Bongouanou Department (1980)
- M'Batto Department (2009)

N'Zi Region

- Bocanda Department (1998)
- Dimbokro Department (1969)
- Kouassi-Kouassikro Department (2012)

=== Lagunes District ===
Agnéby-Tiassa Region

- Agboville Department (1969)
- Sikensi Department (2005)
- Taabo Department (2012)
- Tiassalé Department (1988)

Grands-Ponts Region

- Dabou Department (1998)
- Grand-Lahou Department (1988)
- Jacqueville Department (1998)

La Mé Region

- Adzopé Department (1969)
- Akoupé Department (2005)
- Alépé Department (1998)
- Yakassé-Attobrou Department (2008)

=== Montagnes District ===
Cavally Region

- Bloléquin Department (2005)
- Guiglo Department (1969)
- Taï Department (2013)
- Toulépleu Department (1998)

Guémon Region

- Bangolo Department (1988)
- Duékoué Department (1988)
- Facobly Department (2012)
- Kouibly Department (2005)

Tonkpi Region

- Biankouma Department (1969)
- Danané Department (1969)
- Man Department (1969)
- Sipilou Department (2012)
- Zouan-Hounien Department (2005)

=== Sassandra-Marahoué District ===
Haut-Sassandra Region

- Daloa Department (1969)
- Issia Department (1980)
- Vavoua Department (1988)
- Zoukougbeu Department (2008)

Marahoué Region

- Bonon Department (2020)
- Bouaflé Department (1969)
- Gohitafla Department (2020)
- Sinfra Department (1988)
- Zuénoula Department (1980)

=== Savanes District ===
Bagoué Region

- Boundiali Department (1969)
- Kouto Department (2008)
- Tengréla Department (1980)

Poro Region

- Dikodougou Department (2011)
- Korhogo Department (1969)
- M'Bengué Department (2012)
- Sinématiali Department (2008)

Tchologo Region

- Ferkessédougou Department (1969)
- Kong Department (2012)
- Ouangolodougou Department (2008)

=== Vallée du Bandama District ===
Gbêkê Region

- Béoumi Department (1988)
- Botro Department (2008)
- Bouaké Department (1969)
- Sakassou Department (1988)

Hambol Region

- Dabakala Department (1974)
- Katiola Department (1969)
- Niakaramandougou Department (2009)

=== Woroba District ===
Bafing Region

- Koro Department (2008)
- Ouaninou Department (2011)
- Touba Department (1969)

Béré Region

- Dianra Department (2012)
- Kounahiri Department (2005)
- Mankono Department (1980)

Worodougou Region

- Kani Department (2009)
- Séguéla Department (1969)

=== Yamoussoukro Autonomous District ===
- Attiégouakro Department (2009)
- Yamoussoukro Department (1988)

=== Zanzan District ===
Bounkani Region

- Bouna Department (1974)
- Doropo Department (2011)
- Nassian Department (2005)
- Téhini Department (2011)

Gontougo Region

- Bondoukou Department (1969)
- Koun-Fao Department (2005)
- Sandégué Department (2009)
- Tanda Department (1988)
- Transua Department (2009)

== Defunct departments ==
There are six departments of Ivory Coast that have been eliminated.

- Centre Department (1961–69)
- Centre-Ouest Department (1963–69)
- Est Department (1963–69)
- Nord Department (1961–69)
- Ouest Department (1961–69)
- Sud Department (1961–69)

== Maps of departments through time ==
Map	Years effective	First-level subdivisions	Second-level subdivisions	Third-level subdivisions	Changes
	1961–1963	4 departments	—	—	Four departments created as first-level subdivisions.
	1963 (February)	5 departments	—	—	One department added (Sud-Ouest and Sud-Est split into Ouest, Sud, and Est).
	1963–1969	6 departments	—	—	One department added (Ouest split into Ouest and Centre-Ouest).
	1969–1974	24 departments	—	—	All previous departments abolished. 24 new departments established as first-level subdivisions.
	1974–1975	25 departments	—	—	One department added (Bouna).
	1975–1979	26 departments	—	—	One department added (Dabakala).
	1980–1987	34 departments	—	—	8 departments added.
	1988–1991	49 departments	—	—	15 departments added.
	1991–1995	10 regions	49 departments	—	Regions established.
	1995–1996	10 regions	50 departments	—	One department added (Agnibilékrou).
	1996–1997	12 regions	55 departments	—	2 regions and 5 departments added.
	1997–2000	16 regions	59 departments	—	2 regions and 4 departments added.
	1997–2000	19 regions	59 departments	—	3 regions added.
	2005–2006	19 regions	70 departments	—	11 departments added.
	2006–2008	19 regions	72 departments	—	2 departments added.
	2008–2009	19 regions	89 departments	—	17 departments added.
	2009–2010	19 regions	94 departments	—	5 departments added.
	2010–2011	19 regions	95 departments	—	1 department added.
	2011–2012	12 districts	30 regions	95 departments	Districts created as new 1st level division. New division of regions.
	2012–2013	12 districts	31 regions	107 departments	1 region and 12 departments added.
	2013–2014	12 districts	31 regions	108 departments	1 department added.
	2014–2020	31 regions and 2 autonomous districts	108 departments	—	Districts removed.
	2020–	31 regions and 2 autonomous districts	111 departments	—	Three departments added.
