= List of cities in Ivory Coast =

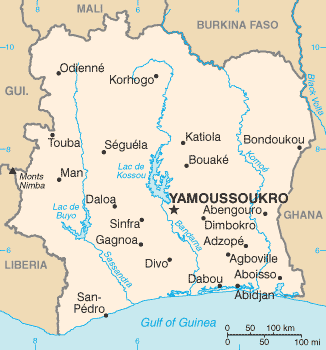
Map of Ivory Coast

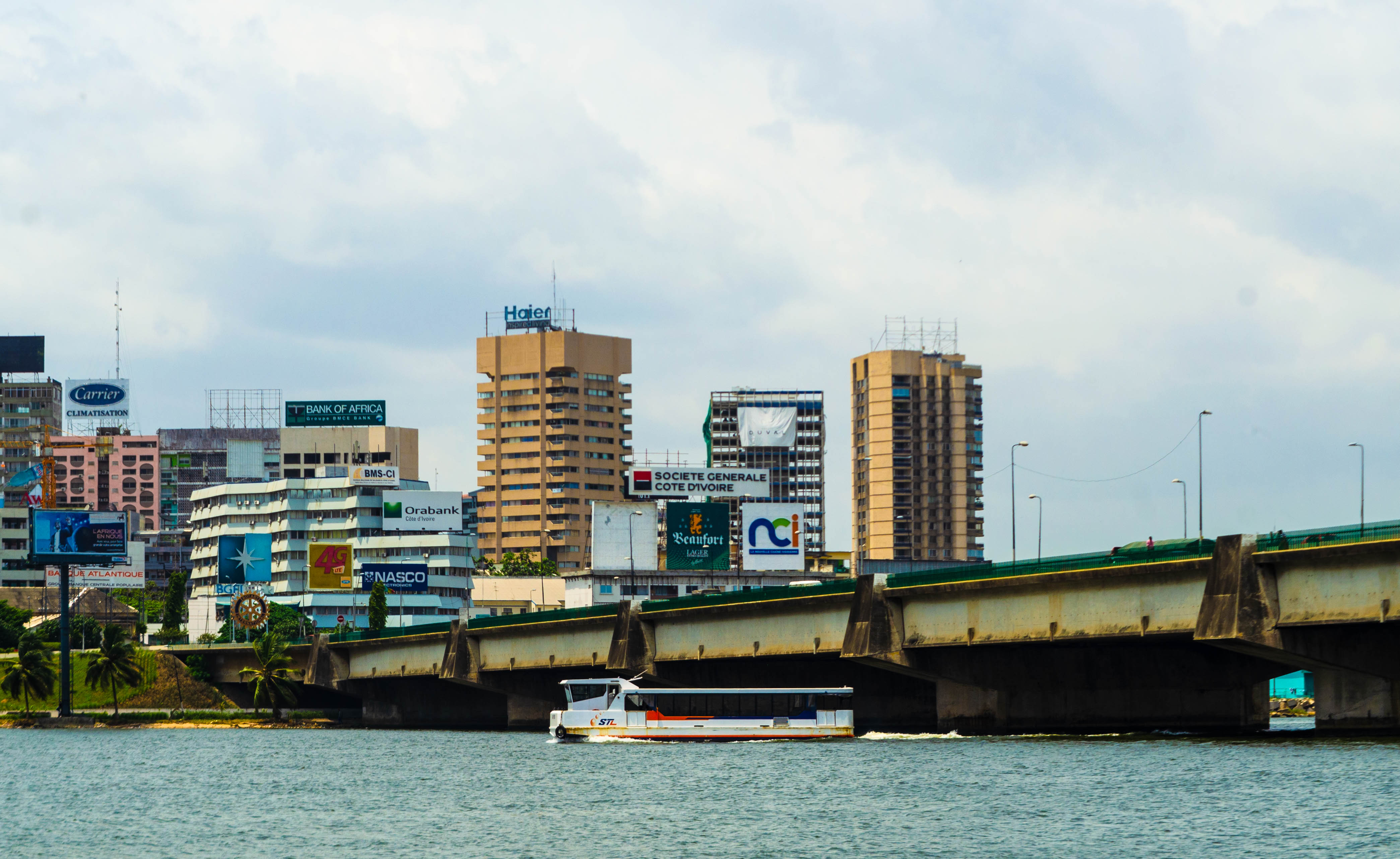
Abidjan, economic capital of Côte d'Ivoire

This is a list of cities in Ivory Coast. Only the 40 most populous cities are listed here.

Largest cities of Ivory Coast, initially ranked by 2005 population
2005 rank	Coordinates	City / town	Population				Region
2005 rank	Coordinates	City / town	1975 census	1988 census	2005 estimate	2014 estimate	Region
1	5°21′31″N 4°00′50″W	Abidjan	951,216	1,934,342	3,692,570	3,677,115	Lagunes
2	7°41′N 5°1′W	Bouaké	175,264	332,999	572,149	567,481	Gbêkê
3	6°53′N 6°27′W	Daloa	60,837	122,933	217,876	319,427	Haut-Sassandra
4	6°49′N 5°17′W	Yamoussoukro	37,253	110,013	200,659	361,893	Bélier
5	4°45′N 6°38′W	San-Pédro	31,606	70,601	195,873	261,616	Bas-Sassandra
6	5°50′N 5°22′W	Divo	35,610	72,494	184,481	184,481	Lôh-Djiboua
7	9°25′N 5°37′W	Korhogo	45,250	109,655	172,114	286,071	Poro
8	5°30′N 4°3′W	Anyama	26,406	57,065	158,250	148,962	Lagunes
9	6°44′N 3°29′W	Abengourou	30,028	58,974	144,074	135,635	Moyen-Comoé
10	7°24′N 7°33′W	Man	50,288	88,294	140,217	188,704	Tonkpi
11	6°8′N 5°56′W	Gagnoa	42,285	85,563	125,647	213,918	Gôh
12	5°47′N 6°36′W	Soubré	7,016	33,162	123,214	175,163	Nawa
13	5°56′N 4°13′W	Agboville	26,914	46,359	108,684	95,093	Agnéby-Tiassa
14	5°19′N 4°23′W	Dabou	23,134	39,494	95,057	88,430	Lagunes
15	5°12′N 3°44′W	Grand-Bassam	27,273	41,825	90,817	84,028	Sud-Comoé
16	6°59′N 5°45′W	Bouaflé	17,188	34,562	89,344	167,263	Marahoué
17	6°29′N 6°35′W	Issia	10,863	28,525	88,251	85,727	Haut-Sassandra
18	6°51′N 5°55′W	Sinfra	17,569	33,971	85,875	130,227	Marahoué
19	8°8′N 5°6′W	Katiola	18,625	33,813	83,695	56,681	Hambol
20	5°21′N 3°54′W	Bingerville	12,527	28,741	83,105	91,319	Lagunes
21	6°10′N 3°59′W	Adzopé	21,147	35,085	81,150	98,846	Mé
22	7°58′N 6°40′W	Séguéla	12,692	29,003	79,565	63,774	Béré
23	8°2′N 2°48′W	Bondoukou	19,021	33,051	79,013	117,453	Gontougo
24	6°23′N 5°25′W	Oumé	14,032	29,521	78,872	127,850	Gôh (ex-Fromager)
25	9°35′N 5°12′W	Ferkessedougou	24,662	35,155	74,966	120,150	Tchologo
26	6°39′N 4°42′W	Dimbokro	31,073	38,183	73,789	64,957	N'zi
27	9°30′N 7°34′W	Odienné	13,911	28,266	71,188	50,506	Denguélé
28	6°44′N 7°21′W	Duékoué	13,297	26,759	68,872	185,344	Guémon
29	7°16′N 8°10′W	Danané	19,608	30,506	68,687	104,672	Dix-Huit Montagnes
30	10°29′N 6°23′W	Tingréla	8,794	22,268	67,746	80,887	Savanes
31	6°33′N 7°29′W	Guiglo	9,283	22,187	63,528	113,796	Moyen-Cavally
32	9°31′N 6°29′W	Boundiali	9,910	22,042	61,998	59,586	Savanes
33	7°13′N 3°20′W	Agnibilékrou	13,355	24,413	59,780	69,174	Moyen-Comoé
34	7°3′N 3°58′W	Daoukro	12,575	22,777	56,310	73,134	N'zi-Comoé
35	7°23′N 6°29′W	Vavoua	6,957	17,717	54,249	134,651	Haut-Sassandra
36	7°26′N 6°3′W	Zuénoula	9,286	19,523	52,630	80,949	Marahoué
37	5°54′N 4°50′W	Tiassalé	10,178	19,894	52,186	58,248	Lagunes
38	6°33′N 5°1′W	Toumodi	13,297	22,114	51,560	63,430	Lacs
39	6°23′N 3°54′W	Akoupé	10,873	20,393	51,387	66,311	Agnéby
40	5°51′N 5°41′W	Lakota	12,958	21,575	50,651	77,223	Lôh-Djiboua
