= Ehuasso =

Ehuasso Ehuiasso
- Village
- Location in Ivory Coast
- Coordinates: 6°20′N 3°27′W
- Country: Ivory Coast
- District: Comoé
- Region: Indénié-Djuablin
- Department: Abengourou
- Sub-prefecture: Zaranou
- Time zone: UTC+0 (GMT)

Ehuasso (also spelled Ehuiasso) is a village in eastern Ivory Coast. It is in the sub-prefecture of Zaranou, Abengourou Department, Indénié-Djuablin Region, Comoé District.

Ehuasso was a commune until March 2012, when it became one of 1,126 communes nationwide that were abolished.
