= Aprompronou =

Aprompronou Apprompron
- Village
- Location in Ivory Coast
- Coordinates: 6°17′N 3°19′W
- Country: Ivory Coast
- District: Comoé
- Region: Indénié-Djuablin
- Department: Bettié
- Sub-prefecture: Diamarakro
- Time zone: UTC+0 (GMT)

Aprompronou (also known as Apprompron) is a village in eastern Ivory Coast. It is in the sub-prefecture of Diamarakro, Bettié Department, Indénié-Djuablin Region, Comoé District.

== History ==
Until 2012, Aprompronou was in the commune of Apprompron-Afêwa. In March 2012, Apprompron-Afêwa became one of 1,126 communes nationwide that were abolished.
