= Tahakro =

Tahakro Taakro
- Village
- Location in Ivory Coast
- Coordinates: 7°0′N 3°44′W
- Country: Ivory Coast
- District: Comoé
- Region: Indénié-Djuablin
- Department: Abengourou
- Sub-prefecture: Amélékia
- Time zone: UTC+0 (GMT)

Tahakro (also spelled Taakro) is a village in eastern Ivory Coast. It is in the sub-prefecture of Amélékia, Abengourou Department, Indénié-Djuablin Region, Comoé District. The village sits on the southeast bank of the Comoé River, which forms the border between Comoé and Lacs Districts.

Tahakro was a commune until March 2012, when it became one of 1,126 communes nationwide that were abolished.
