= Amoriakro =

- Village
- Location in Ivory Coast
- Coordinates: 7°6′N 3°32′W
- Country: Ivory Coast
- District: Comoé
- Region: Indénié-Djuablin
- Department: Agnibilékrou
- Sub-prefecture: Duffrébo
- Time zone: UTC+0 (GMT)

Amoriakro is a village in eastern Ivory Coast. It is in the sub-prefecture of Duffrébo, Agnibilékrou Department, Indénié-Djuablin Region, Comoé District.

Amoriakro was a commune until March 2012, when it became one of 1,126 communes nationwide that were abolished.
