= Abradinou =

- Village
- Location in Ivory Coast
- Coordinates: 6°12′N 3°27′W
- Country: Ivory Coast
- District: Comoé
- Region: Indénié-Djuablin
- Department: Bettié
- Sub-prefecture: Bettié
- Time zone: UTC+0 (GMT)

Abradinou is a village in south-eastern Ivory Coast. It is in the sub-prefecture of Bettié, Bettié Department, Indénié-Djuablin Region, Comoé District. The village lies on the east bank of the Komoé River, which is the boundary between the Comoé and Lagunes Districts.

Abradinou was a commune until March 2012, when it became one of 1,126 communes nationwide that were abolished.
