= Yobouakro =

- Village
- Location in Ivory Coast
- Coordinates: 7°14′N 3°19′W
- Country: Ivory Coast
- District: Comoé
- Region: Indénié-Djuablin
- Department: Agnibilékrou
- Sub-prefecture: Agnibilékrou
- Time zone: UTC+0 (GMT)

Yobouakro is a village in eastern Ivory Coast. It is in the sub-prefecture of Agnibilékrou, Agnibilékrou Department, Indénié-Djuablin Region, Comoé District. The village sits just south of the border with Zanzan District.

Yobouakro was a commune until March 2012, when it became one of 1,126 communes nationwide that were abolished.
