= Manzanouan =

- Village
- Location in Ivory Coast
- Coordinates: 6°50′34″N 3°17′14″W
- Country: Ivory Coast
- District: Comoé
- Region: Indénié-Djuablin
- Department: Agnibilékrou
- Sub-prefecture: Akoboissué
- Time zone: UTC+0 (GMT)

Manzanouan is a village in eastern Ivory Coast. It is in the sub-prefecture of Akoboissué, Agnibilékrou Department, Indénié-Djuablin Region, Comoé District. Six kilometres east of the village is a border crossing with Ghana.

Manzanouan was a commune until March 2012, when it became one of 1,126 communes nationwide that were abolished.
