= Bouadikro =

- Village
- Location in Ivory Coast
- Coordinates: 6°46′N 3°31′W
- Country: Ivory Coast
- District: Comoé
- Region: Indénié-Djuablin
- Department: Abengourou
- Sub-prefecture: Abengourou
- Time zone: UTC+0 (GMT)

Bouadikro is a village in eastern Ivory Coast. It is two kilometres north of Abengourou, in the sub-prefecture of Abengourou, Abengourou Department, Indénié-Djuablin Region, Comoé District.

Bouadikro was a commune until March 2012, when it became one of 1,126 communes nationwide that were abolished.
