= Diangobo, Comoé =

Diangobo
- Village
- Location in Ivory Coast
- Coordinates: 6°34′N 3°20′W
- Country: Ivory Coast
- District: Comoé
- Region: Indénié-Djuablin
- Department: Abengourou
- Sub-prefecture: Niablé
- Time zone: UTC+0 (GMT)

Diangobo is a village in eastern Ivory Coast. It is in the sub-prefecture of Niablé, Abengourou Department, Indénié-Djuablin Region, Comoé District.

Diangobo was a commune until March 2012, when it became one of 1,126 communes nationwide that were abolished.
