= Dododou =

- Village
- Location in Ivory Coast
- Coordinates: 5°39′N 5°37′W
- Country: Ivory Coast
- District: Gôh-Djiboua
- Region: Lôh-Djiboua
- Department: Lakota
- Sub-prefecture: Goudouko
- Time zone: UTC+0 (GMT)

Dododou is a village located in the southern part of the Ivory Coast. It is in the sub-prefecture of Goudouko, Lakota Department, Lôh-Djiboua Region, Gôh-Djiboua District.
