= Bangoua =

- Village
- Location in Ivory Coast
- Coordinates: 7°20′N 3°29′W
- Country: Ivory Coast
- District: Comoé
- Region: Indénié-Djuablin
- Department: Agnibilékrou
- Sub-prefecture: Duffrébo
- Time zone: UTC+0 (GMT)

Bangoua is a village in eastern Ivory Coast. It is in the sub-prefecture of Duffrébo, Agnibilékrou Department, Indénié-Djuablin Region, Comoé District. Bangoua sits just south of the border with Zanzan District and is located six kilometres east of the tripoint of Comoé, Zanzan, and Lacs Districts. It is the most northern settlement in Comoé District.

Bangoua was a commune until March 2012, when it became one of 1,126 communes nationwide that were abolished.
