= Gragba-Dagolilié =

- Village
- Location in Ivory Coast
- Coordinates: 5°56′N 5°37′W
- Country: Ivory Coast
- District: Gôh-Djiboua
- Region: Lôh-Djiboua
- Department: Divo
- Sub-prefecture: Lakota
- Time zone: UTC+0 (GMT)

Gragba-Dagolilié is a village in southern Ivory Coast. It is in the sub-prefecture of Lakota, Lakota Department, Lôh-Djiboua Region, Gôh-Djiboua District.

Gragba-Dagolilié was a commune until March 2012, when it became one of 1,126 communes nationwide that were abolished.
