= Ebilassokro =

- Town and sub-prefecture
- Location in Ivory Coast
- Coordinates: 6°23′N 3°21′W
- Country: Ivory Coast
- District: Comoé
- Region: Indénié-Djuablin
- Department: Abengourou

Area
  - Total: 208 km^{2} (80 sq mi)

Population (2021 census)
  - Total: 28,331
  - Density: 136/km^{2} (353/sq mi)
  - Town: 14,295
- (2014 census)
- Time zone: UTC+0 (GMT)

Ebilassokro is a town in eastern Ivory Coast. It is a sub-prefecture of Abengourou Department in Indénié-Djuablin Region, Comoé District.

Ebilassokro was a commune until March 2012, when it became one of 1,126 communes nationwide that were abolished.

In 2021, the population of the sub-prefecture of Ebilassokro was 28,331.

== Villages ==
The three villages of the sub-prefecture of Ebilassokro and their population in 2014 are:

1. Ebilassokro (14,295)
2. Akati (4,343)
3. Kouamétiémelekro (795)
