= Damé =

- Town and sub-prefecture
- Location in Ivory Coast
- Coordinates: 7°4′N 3°9′W
- Country: Ivory Coast
- District: Comoé
- Region: Indénié-Djuablin
- Department: Agnibilékrou

Population (2014)
  - Total: 15,920
- Time zone: UTC+0 (GMT)

Damé is a town in eastern Ivory Coast. It is a sub-prefecture of Agnibilékrou Department in Indénié-Djuablin Region, Comoé District. Seven kilometres east of the town is a border crossing with Ghana.

Damé was a commune until March 2012, when it became one of 1,126 communes nationwide that were abolished. In 2014, the population of the sub-prefecture of Damé was 15,920.

== Villages ==
The nine villages of the sub-prefecture of Damé and their population in 2014 are:

1. Damé (9,676)
2. Adamakro (419)
3. Amangobo (284)
4. Brahimankro (1,377)
5. Fraakro (368)
6. Kotokosso (1,866)
7. Massakro (1,350)
8. Morekro (351)
9. Sirikikro (229)
