= Musée Binger de Zaranou =

Musée Binger de ZaranouThe Musée Binger de Zaranou

Geography
- Location: Zaranou, Ivory Coast, Comoé District

The Musée Binger de Zaranou is a museum located in Ivory Coast. It is located in Zaranou, Comoé District.

== See also ==
- List of museums in Ivory Coast
