= Iroporia =

Village in southern Ivory Coast

- Village
- Location in Ivory Coast
- Coordinates: 6°3′N 5°13′W
- Country: Ivory Coast
- District: Gôh-Djiboua
- Region: Lôh-Djiboua
- Department: Divo
- Sub-prefecture: Didoko
- Time zone: UTC+0 (GMT)

Iroporia is a village in southern Ivory Coast. It is in the sub-prefecture of Didoko, Divo Department, Lôh-Djiboua Region, Gôh-Djiboua District.

Iroporia was a commune until March 2012, when it became one of 1,126 communes nationwide that were abolished.
