= Tanguélan =

Tanguélan Tenguélan
- Town and sub-prefecture
- Coat of arms

- Location in Ivory Coast
- Coordinates: 7°10′N 3°18′W
- Country: Ivory Coast
- District: Comoé
- Region: Djuablin
- Department: Agnibilékrou

Population (2014)
  - Total: 12,021
- Time zone: UTC+0 (GMT)

Tanguélan (also spelled Tenguélan) is a town in eastern Ivory Coast. It is a sub-prefecture of Agnibilékrou Department in Indénié-Djuablin Region, Comoé District.

Tanguélan was a commune until March 2012, when it became one of 1,126 communes nationwide that were abolished. In 2014, the population of the sub-prefecture of Tanguélan was 12,021.

== Villages ==
The eight villages of the sub-prefecture of Tanguélan and their population in 2014 are:

1. Tanguelan (7,022)
2. Adanekro (394)
3. Assemiankro (168)
4. Assempa Naye (222)
5. Ebakro (186)
6. Kouamekro (207)
7. Miankouadiokro (106)
8. N'guessankro (3,716)
