= Djidji =

- Town and sub-prefecture
- Location in Ivory Coast
- Coordinates: 6°7′N 5°41′W
- Country: Ivory Coast
- District: Gôh-Djiboua
- Region: Lôh-Djiboua
- Department: Lakota

Population (2014)
  - Total: 12,375
- Time zone: UTC+0 (GMT)

Djidji is a town in southern Ivory Coast. It is a sub-prefecture of Lakota Department in Lôh-Djiboua Region, Gôh-Djiboua District.

Djidji was a commune until March 2012, when it became one of 1,126 communes nationwide that were abolished.

In 2014, the population of the sub-prefecture of Djidji was 12,375.

== Villages ==
The seven villages of the sub-prefecture of Djidji and their population in 2014 are:

1. Béssaboua (725)
2. Djidji (3,915)
3. Dousséba (1,469)
4. Faitaikro (773)
5. Godou (2,104)
6. Krikpoko (2,612)
7. Niablé (777)
