= Didoko =

- Town and sub-prefecture
- Location in Ivory Coast
- Coordinates: 6°1′N 5°19′W
- Country: Ivory Coast
- District: Gôh-Djiboua
- Region: Lôh-Djiboua
- Department: Divo

Population (2014)
  - Total: 21,660
- Time zone: UTC+0 (GMT)

Didoko is a town in southern Ivory Coast. It is a sub-prefecture of Divo Department in Lôh-Djiboua Region, Gôh-Djiboua District.

Didoko was a commune until March 2012, when it became one of 1,126 communes nationwide that were abolished.

In 2014, the population of the sub-prefecture of Didoko was 21,660.

== Villages ==
The nine villages of the sub-prefecture of Didoko and their population in 2014 are 21,660.

1. Diankro (1,239)
2. Didoko (7,071)
3. Doubo (1,100)
4. Groh1 (305
5. Groh2 (1,010)
6. Guéhou (1,860)
7. Iroporia (3,714)
8. Mbazo (610)
9. Zéhiri 1 (2,592)
