= Akoboissué =

Akoboissué Ako-bowoué-ssué
- Town and sub-prefecture
- Location in Ivory Coast
- Coordinates: 6°58′N 3°14′W
- Country: Ivory Coast
- District: Comoé
- Region: Indénié-Djuablin
- Department: Agnibilékrou

Population (2014)
  - Total: 28,647
- Time zone: UTC+0 (GMT)

Akoboissué (also spelled Akabovvosué) is a town in eastern Ivory Coast. It is a sub-prefecture of Agnibilékrou Department in Indénié-Djuablin Region, Comoé District. fifteen kilometres east of town is a border crossing with Ghana.

Akoboissué was a commune until March 2012, when it became one of 1,126 communes nationwide that were abolished. In 2014, the population of the sub-prefecture of Akoboissué was 28,647.

== Villages ==
The seven villages of the sub-prefecture of Akoboissué and their population in 2014 are:

1. Akoboissué (6,206)
2. Brindoukro (2,598)
3. Emanzoukro (1,106)
4. Manzanouan (10,202)
5. N'djorekro Agni (1,424)
6. Siakakro (5,837)
7. Sinikosson (1,274)
