= Amélékia =

- Town and sub-prefecture
- Location in Ivory Coast
- Coordinates: 6°50′N 3°35′W
- Country: Ivory Coast
- District: Comoé
- Region: Indénié-Djuablin
- Department: Abengourou

Population (2014)
  - Total: 25,238
- Time zone: UTC+0 (GMT)

Amélékia is a town in eastern Ivory Coast. It is a sub-prefecture of Abengourou Department in Indénié-Djuablin Region, Comoé District.

Amélékia was a commune until March 2012, when it became one of 1,126 communes nationwide that were abolished.

The government of the Ivory Coast is trying to merge different municipalities and communes in their attempt to increase urbanization and reduce bureaucracy and costs of administration.

In 2014, the population of the sub-prefecture of Amélékia was 25,238.

== Villages ==
The nine villages of the sub-prefecture of Amélékia and their population in 2014 are:

1. Amélékia (8,634)
2. Ameakro (1,529)
3. Anougbakro (2,904)
4. Elinso (2,961)
5. Koitienkro (2,338)
6. Konan Konankro (1,537)
7. Kouadiokro (599)
8. Tahakro (1,928)
9. Zebenou (2,808)
