= Ngamen Kouassi Cyrille Dalex =

Nigerian professor of philosophy (born 1971)

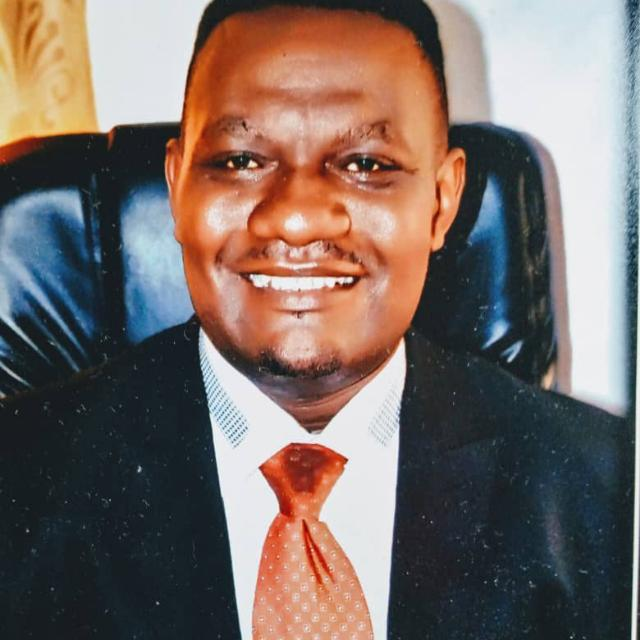
- Born: 22 August 1971 (age 55); Bangoua, Cameroon
- Children: 4

Academic background
- Education: University of Port-Harcourt, Catholic University of Central Africa, Salesiana University

Academic work
- Discipline: Existentialism and phenomenology
- Institutions: National Open University of Nigeria

Ngamen Kouassi Cyrille Dalex is a Cameroonian academic, philosopher and writer. He is the author of the philosophy book "The Political Existentialism of Jean-Paul Sartre: The Search for Collective Freedom". Ngamen, a professor of philosophy, has specialty in Ethics, Social and Political Philosophy.

== Background and academic career ==
Ngamen was born in Bangoua in Cameroon and attended the Catholic University of Central Africa, Yaounde, where he obtained a Diploma, Bachelors and master's degrees in philosophy. He then proceeded to the University of Port-Harcourt, Nigeria, where he obtained a doctorate degree in philosophy (with emphasis on existentialism and phenomenology). Ngamen started his career as a university lecturer at Igbinedion University, Okada; before moving to Samuel Adegboyega University, Ogwa, Edo State, Nigeria. He is currently the Dean of the College of Arts and Humanities, Samuel Adegboyega University as well as the editor of Journal of Arts and Social Sciences published by Igbinedion University, Okada.

== Selected works ==
Ngamen is the author of philosophy book titled "The Political Existentialism of Jean-Paul Sartre: The Search for Collective Freedom". He also authored the Journal article titled: "Absolute Freedom and Determinism in Satre: Overcoming the dilemma.
