= Diamarakro =

Diamarakro Diambarakrou
- Town and sub-prefecture
- Location in Ivory Coast
- Coordinates: 6°14′N 3°19′W
- Country: Ivory Coast
- District: Comoé
- Region: Indénié-Djuablin
- Department: Bettié

Population (2014)
  - Total: 31,113
- Time zone: UTC+0 (GMT)

Diamarakro (also known as Diambarakrou) is a town in south-eastern Ivory Coast. It is a sub-prefecture of Bettié Department in Indénié-Djuablin Region, Comoé District.

Diamarakro was a commune until March 2012, when it became one of 1,126 communes nationwide that were abolished.

In 2014, the population of the sub-prefecture of Diamarakro was 31,113.

== Villages ==
The fourteen villages of the sub-prefecture of Diamarakro and their population in 2014 are:

1. Diamarakro (5,479)
2. Attiékro (4,525)
3. Kouamekro (506)
4. Djaha Konankro (709)
5. Akakro (733)
6. Tanokro (773)
7. Borobo (2,452)
8. N’zikro (432)
9. Aneykro (1,731)
10. Djattokro (1,948)
11. Issoufkro (457)
12. Adamakro (Adama Ecole) (3,088)
13. Moussakro (2,802)
14. Appronpron Afewa (5,479)
