= Yakassé-Féyassé =

- Town and sub-prefecture
- Location in Ivory Coast
- Coordinates: 6°57′N 3°25′W
- Country: Ivory Coast
- District: Comoé
- Region: Indénié-Djuablin
- Department: Abengourou

Population (2014)
  - Total: 36,838
- Time zone: UTC+0 (GMT)

Yakassé-Féyassé is a town in eastern Ivory Coast. It is a sub-prefecture of Abengourou Department in Indénié-Djuablin Region, Comoé District.

Yakassé-Féyassé was a commune until March 2012, when it became one of 1,126 communes nationwide that were abolished.

In 2014, the population of the sub-prefecture of Yakassé-Féyassé was 36,838.

== Villages ==
The nine villages of the sub-prefecture of Yakassé-Féyassé and their population in 2014 are:

1. Yakassé-Feyassé (7,664)
2. Apprompronou (4,276)
3. Eboissué (1,595)
4. Kouamé N'ziankro (1,893)
5. Padiégnan (3,391)
6. Sankadiokro (9,736)
7. Yao Babikro (1,393)
8. Zamaka (3,566)
9. Zinzenou (3,324)
