= Chiépo =

- Town and sub-prefecture
- Location in Ivory Coast
- Coordinates: 5°41′N 5°3′W
- Country: Ivory Coast
- District: Gôh-Djiboua
- Region: Lôh-Djiboua
- Department: Divo

Population (2014)
  - Total: 31,006
- Time zone: UTC+0 (GMT)

Chiépo is a town in southern Ivory Coast. It is a sub-prefecture of Divo Department in Lôh-Djiboua Region, Gôh-Djiboua District.

Chiépo was a commune until March 2012, when it became one of 1,126 communes nationwide that were abolished.

In 2014, the population of the sub-prefecture of Chiépo was 31,006.

== Villages ==
The 11 villages of the sub-prefecture of Chiépo and their population in 2014 are:

1. Brevet (2,748)
2. Cfi-Baroko (5,902)
3. Chiépo (5,372)
4. Divripo (517)
5. Gawadougou (1,029)
6. Guiguidou (2,333)
7. Kétasso (4,142)
8. Kokpa (2,573)
9. Kpatasso (1,392)
10. Siata (1,327)
