= Musée national du costume de Grand-Bassam =

Coordinates: 5°11′46″N 3°44′13″W

Musée national du costume de Grand-BassamThe Musée national du costume de Grand-Bassam

Geography
- Location: Grand-Bassam, Comoé District, Ivory Coast

The Musée national du costume de Grand-Bassam is a museum located in Ivory Coast. It is located in Grand-Bassam, Comoé District.

== See also ==
- List of museums in Ivory Coast
