= Musée Charles et Marguerithe Bieth =

Musée Charles et Marguerithe BiethThe Musée Charles et Marguerithe Bieth

Geography
- Location: Abengourou, Comoé District, Ivory Coast

The Musée Charles et Marguerithe Bieth is a museum located in Ivory Coast. It is located in Abengourou, Comoé District.

== See also ==
- List of museums in Ivory Coast
