= Musée du Parc M'Ploussoue de Bonoua =

Geography
- Location: Bonoua, Comoé District, Ivory Coast
- Coordinates: 5.2791°N 3.6012°W

The Musée du Parc M'Ploussoue de Bonoua is a museum located in Ivory Coast. It is located in Bonoua, Comoé District.

== See also ==
- List of museums in Ivory Coast
- Bonoua
- Comoé District
