= Nébo =

- Town and sub-prefecture
- Location in Ivory Coast
- Coordinates: 5°56′N 5°24′W
- Country: Ivory Coast
- District: Gôh-Djiboua
- Region: Lôh-Djiboua
- Department: Divo

Population (2014)
  - Total: 18,673
- Time zone: UTC+0 (GMT)

Nébo is a town in southern Ivory Coast. It is a sub-prefecture of Divo Department in Lôh-Djiboua Region, Gôh-Djiboua District.

Nébo was a commune until March 2012, when it became one of 1,126 communes nationwide that were abolished.

In 2014, the population of the sub-prefecture of Nébo was 18,673.

== Villages ==
The 18 villages of the sub-prefecture of Nébo and their population in 2014 are:

1. Adjéhililié (2,367)
2. Akabia (Guébié) (864)
3. Akazalilié (240)
4. Bazalilié (302)
5. Boko (700)
6. Braboré (1,594)
7. Digo (460)
8. Dougako (474)
9. Gnéhiri (1,197)
10. Kazo (921)
11. Koukouédou (1,220)
12. Kpérédi (576)
13. Krézoukoué (4,362)
14. Lagazé (525)
15. Lédou (504)
16. Légbélilié (303)
17. Nébo (1,434)
18. Soubrélilié 1 (630)
