= Diangobo =

Diangobo may refer to:

- Diangobo, Comoé, Ivory Coast
- Diangobo, Lagunes, Ivory Coast
- Diangokro, Lacs District, Ivory Coast, which is also referred to as Diangobo
