= Niambézaaria =

Niambézaaria Niambézaria
- Town and sub-prefecture
- Location in Ivory Coast
- Coordinates: 5°40′N 5°56′W
- Country: Ivory Coast
- District: Gôh-Djiboua
- Region: Lôh-Djiboua
- Department: Lakota

Population (2014)
  - Total: 61,253
- Time zone: UTC+0 (GMT)

Niambézaaria (also spelled Niambézaria) is a town in southern Ivory Coast. It is a sub-prefecture of Lakota Department in Lôh-Djiboua Region, Gôh-Djiboua District.

Niambézaaria was a commune until March 2012, when it became one of 1,126 communes nationwide that were abolished.

In 2014, the population of the sub-prefecture of Niambézaria was 61,253.

== Villages ==
The 22 villages of the sub-prefecture of Niambézaria and their population in 2014 are:

1. Adama Kouamekro (4,288)
2. Béyo (2,072)
3. Bobolilié (3,020)
4. Gagoué (514)
5. Gnahouahué 1 (2,407)
6. Gobéry (2,338)
7. Goboué (1,169)
8. Godélilié 1 (3,783)
9. Godélilié 2 (1,454)
10. Kokolilié (3,030)
11. Kpadagnoa (3,625)
12. Kparognoua (2,555)
13. Krikpoko 1 (2,970)
14. Krikpoko 2 (4,453)
15. Néko (3,607)
16. Nékotiégba (1,004)
17. Niakoblognoa (8,756)
18. Niambézaria (5,839)
19. Tagobéri (917)
20. Toutouko (1,773)
21. Troko (727)
22. Zahidougba (952)
