= Musée des Civilisations de Côte d'Ivoire =

Musée des Civilisations de Côte d'Ivoire Museum of Civilizations in Ivory Coast
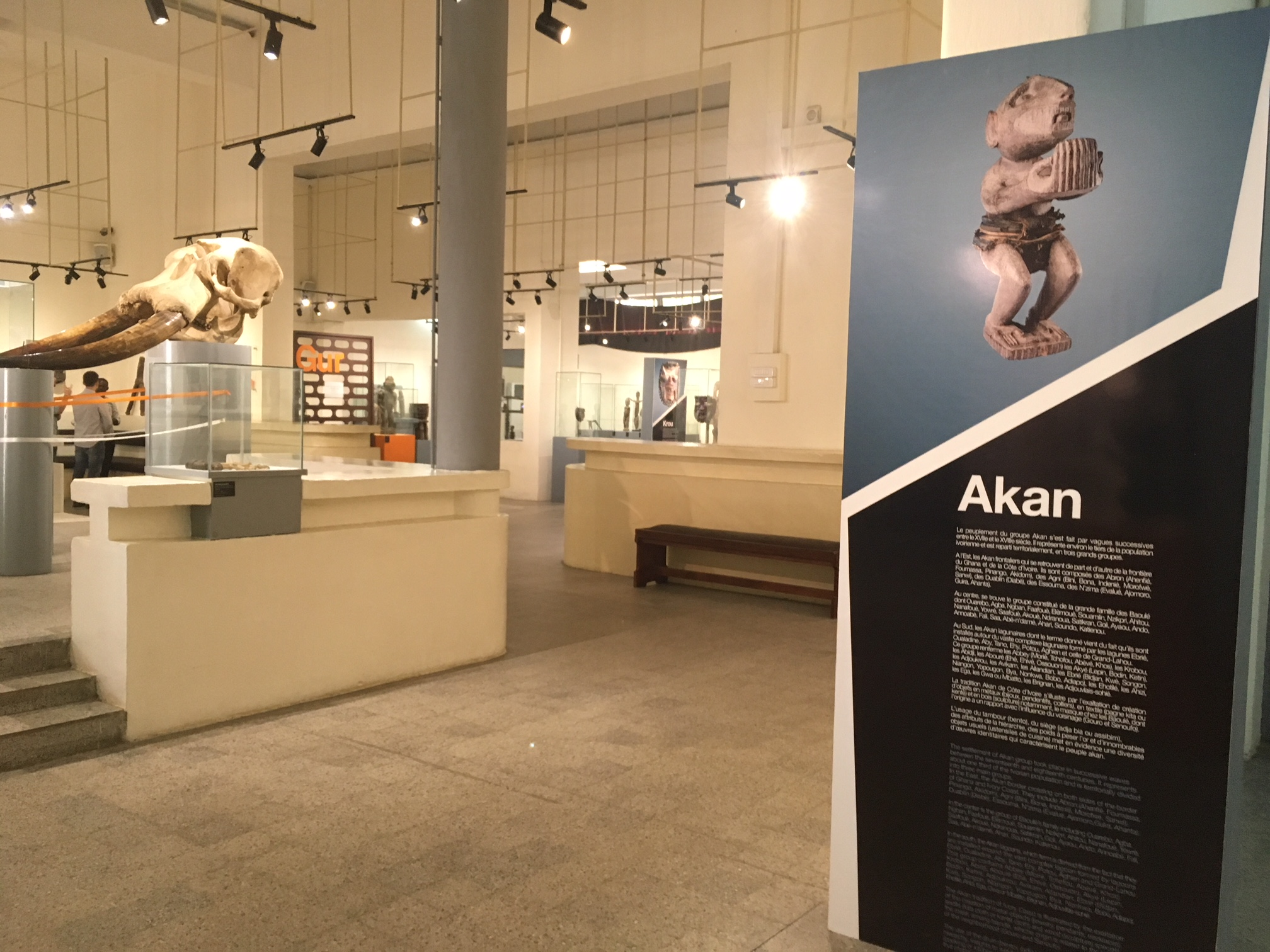
- Established: 1942
- Location: Plateau, Abidjan, Ivory Coast
- Coordinates: 5.3335°N 4.0241°W
- Type: National museum
- Collections: Ethnography, archaeology, contemporary art, documents and archives on cultural heritage, photographs
- Website: www.museedescivilisations.com

The Musée des Civilisations de Côte d'Ivoire (MCCI) is a state museum located in Ivory Coast. It is located in Plateau, Abidjan. It exhibits ethnographic, archaeological and iconographic works from Ivory Coast.

== See also ==
- List of museums in Ivory Coast
