= Musée des Armées =

Musée des ArméesThe Musée des Armées

Geography
- Location: Plateau, Abidjan, Ivory Coast

The Musée des Armées is a museum in Ivory Coast. It is located in Plateau, Abidjan.

== See also ==
- List of museums in Ivory Coast
