= Duffrébo =

- Town and sub-prefecture
- Location in Ivory Coast
- Coordinates: 7°5′N 3°27′W
- Country: Ivory Coast
- District: Comoé
- Region: Indénié-Djuablin
- Department: Agnibilékrou

Population (2014)
  - Total: 42,426
- Time zone: UTC+0 (GMT)

Duffrébo is a town in eastern Ivory Coast. It is a sub-prefecture of Agnibilékrou Department in Indénié-Djuablin Region, Comoé District.

Duffrébo was a commune until March 2012, when it became one of 1,126 communes nationwide that were abolished. In 2014, the population of the sub-prefecture of Duffrébo was 42,426.

== Villages ==
The seventeen villages of the sub-prefecture of Duffrébo and their population in 2014 are:

1. Duffrebo (6,450)
2. Adahama (1,054)
3. Agninikro (1,240)
4. Akpokro (1,768)
5. Amoriakro (7,100)
6. Andrekro (337)
7. Anziankro (3,055)
8. Apouessou (1,233)
9. Attobro (1,206)
10. Bangoua (5,600)
11. Ceceluibo (1,212)
12. Comoe N'danou (3,523)
13. Kokonou (2,071)
14. Kouaokro Pk (1,614)
15. N'djorekro Abbey (859)
16. N'drikro (1,622)
17. N'grah (2,483)
