= Musée Adja Swa =

Musée Adja SwaThe Musée Adja Swa

Geography
- Location: Abidjan, Ivory Coast

The Musée Adja Swa is a museum located in Abidjan, Ivory Coast.

== See also ==
- List of museums in Ivory Coast
