= Zégo =

- Town and sub-prefecture
- Location in Ivory Coast
- Coordinates: 6°9′N 5°9′W
- Country: Ivory Coast
- District: Gôh-Djiboua
- Region: Lôh-Djiboua
- Department: Divo

Population (2014)
  - Total: 24,994
- Time zone: UTC+0 (GMT)

Zégo is a town in southern Ivory Coast. It is a sub-prefecture of Divo Department in Lôh-Djiboua Region, Gôh-Djiboua District.

Zégo was a commune until March 2012, when it became one of 1,126 communes nationwide that were abolished.

In 2014, the population of the sub-prefecture of Zégo was 24,994.

== Villages ==
The eight villages of the sub-prefecture of Zégo and their population in 2014 are:

1. Apparagra (1,626)
2. Bokasso (2,294)
3. Daako (3,057)
4. Goudi (9,507)
5. Kaouadio Bahkro (4,625)
6. Kouassi Kouamékro (671)
7. Zégo (2,663)
8. Zégo Konankro (551)
