= Gagoré =

Gagoré Gogné
- Town and sub-prefecture
- Location in Ivory Coast
- Coordinates: 6°3′N 5°38′W
- Country: Ivory Coast
- District: Gôh-Djiboua
- Region: Lôh-Djiboua
- Department: Lakota

Population (2014)
  - Total: 15,011
- Time zone: UTC+0 (GMT)

Gagoré (also spelled Gogné) is a town in southern Ivory Coast. It is a sub-prefecture of Lakota Department in Lôh-Djiboua Region, Gôh-Djiboua District.

Gagoré was a commune until March 2012, when it became one of 1,126 communes nationwide that were abolished.

In 2014, the population of the sub-prefecture of Gagoré was 15,011.

== Villages ==
The five villages of the sub-prefecture of Gagoré and their population in 2014 are:

1. Brihiri (585)
2. Digako (3,901)
3. Gagoré (2,417)
4. Kadéko (6,390)
5. Zatoboua (1,718)
