= Musée Péléféro Gbon Coulibaly =

Museum in Korhogo, Ivory Coast

Coordinates: 9°27′21.4″N 5°37′38.3″W

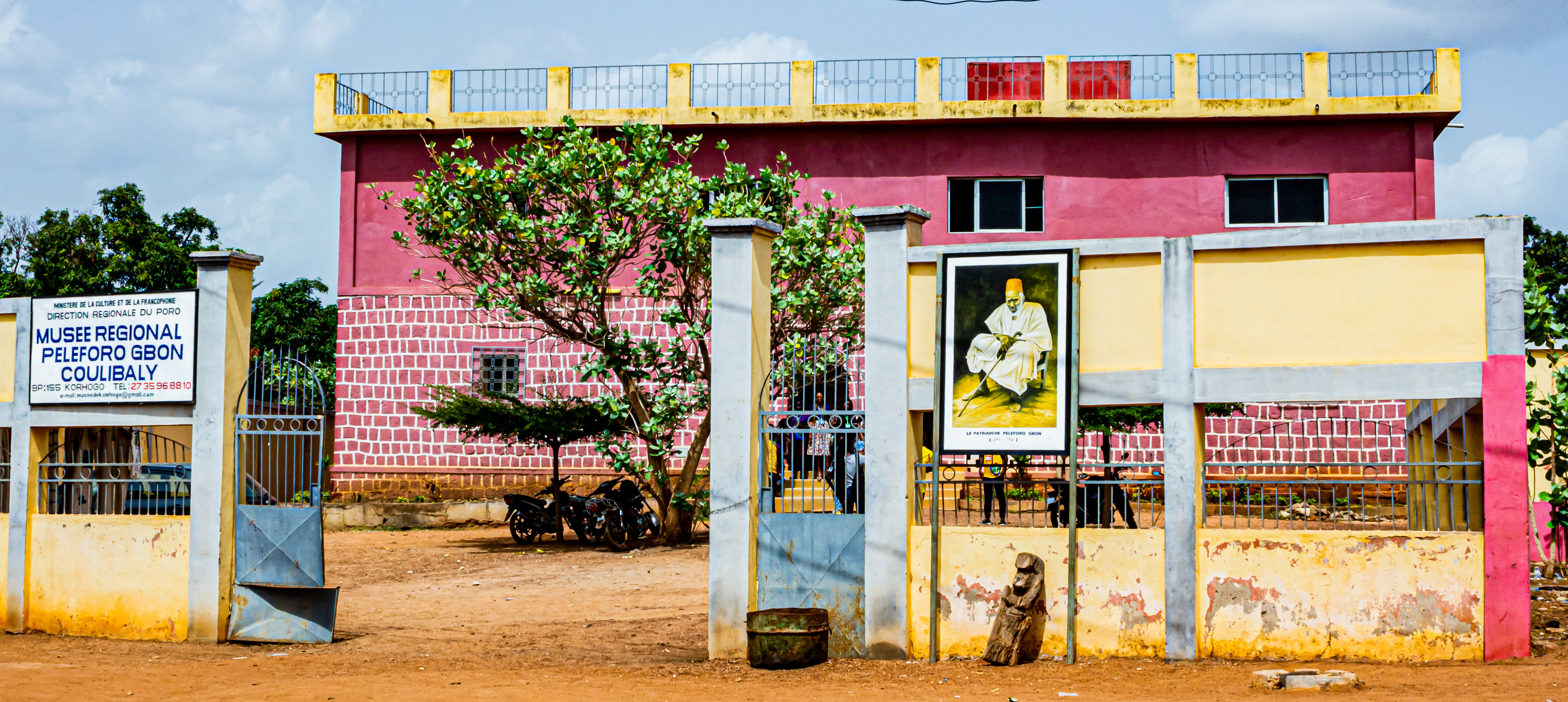
- Location: Korhogo, Savanes District, Ivory Coast

The Musée Péléféro Gbon Coulibaly is a museum located in Ivory Coast. It is located in Korhogo, Savanes District.

== See also ==
- List of museums in Ivory Coast
