= Ogoudou =

Town and sub-prefecture in Gôh-Djiboua, Ivory Coast

- Town and sub-prefecture
- Location in Ivory Coast
- Coordinates: 5°54′N 5°10′W
- Country: Ivory Coast
- District: Gôh-Djiboua
- Region: Lôh-Djiboua
- Department: Divo

Area
  - Total: 532 km^{2} (205 sq mi)

Population (2021 census)
  - Total: 72,586
  - Density: 136/km^{2} (353/sq mi)
  - Town: 14,779
- (2014 census)
- Time zone: UTC+0 (GMT)

Ogoudou is a town in southern Ivory Coast. It is a sub-prefecture of Divo Department in Lôh-Djiboua Region, Gôh-Djiboua District.

Ogoudou was a commune until March 2012, when it became one of 1,126 communes nationwide that were abolished.

In 2021, the population of the sub-prefecture of Ogoudou was 72,586.

== Villages ==
The nine villages of the sub-prefecture of Ogoudou and their population in 2014 are:

1. Ahouanou 2 (1,871)
2. Béhiri (1,534)
3. Blé (2,994)
4. Djékouamékro (2,588)
5. Hermankono-Garo (14,216)
6. Kouamékro (5,653)
7. Obié (3,827)
8. Ogoudou (14,779)
9. Sakota (904)
