= List of museums in Ivory Coast =

This is a list of museums in Ivory Coast.

== List ==
- Musée Adja Swa
- Musée Binger de Zaranou
- Musée Charles et Marguerithe Bieth
- Musée des Armées
- Musée des Civilisations de Cort d'Ivore
- Musée du Parc M'Ploussoue de Bonoua
- Musée Municipal d'Art Contemporain de Cocody
- Musée National du Costume
- Musée Régional Peleforo Gbon Coulibaly

== See also ==
- List of museums
