= Aniassué =

Aniassué Agniassué; Aniasué
- Town and sub-prefecture
- Location in Ivory Coast
- Coordinates: 6°39′N 3°41′W
- Country: Ivory Coast
- District: Comoé
- Region: Indénié-Djuablin
- Department: Abengourou

Population (2014)
  - Total: 40,498
- Time zone: UTC+0 (GMT)

Aniassué (also spelled Agniassué and Aniasué) is a town in eastern Ivory Coast. It is a sub-prefecture of Abengourou Department in Indénié-Djuablin Region, Comoé District.

Aniassué was a commune until March 2012 when it was abolished along with 1,126 others nationwide. In 2014, the population of the sub-prefecture of Aniassué was 40,498.

== Villages ==
The twelve villages of the sub-prefecture of Aniassué and their population in 2014 are:

1. Aniassué (9,325)
2. Ahinikro (934)
3. Amangouakro (1,921)
4. Amian Kouassikro (6,911)
5. Anekouadiokro (2,292)
6. Assakro (6,734)
7. Assemanou (1,709)
8. Dallo (1,018)
9. Ettienkro (830)
10. Kabrankro (1,176)
11. N'grakon (2,608)
12. Satikran (5,039)
