= Bettié =

- Town, sub-prefecture, and commune
- Location in Ivory Coast
- Coordinates: 6°4′N 3°24′W
- Country: Ivory Coast
- District: Comoé
- Region: Indénié-Djuablin
- Department: Bettié

Population (2014)
  - Total: 24,983
- Time zone: UTC+0 (GMT)

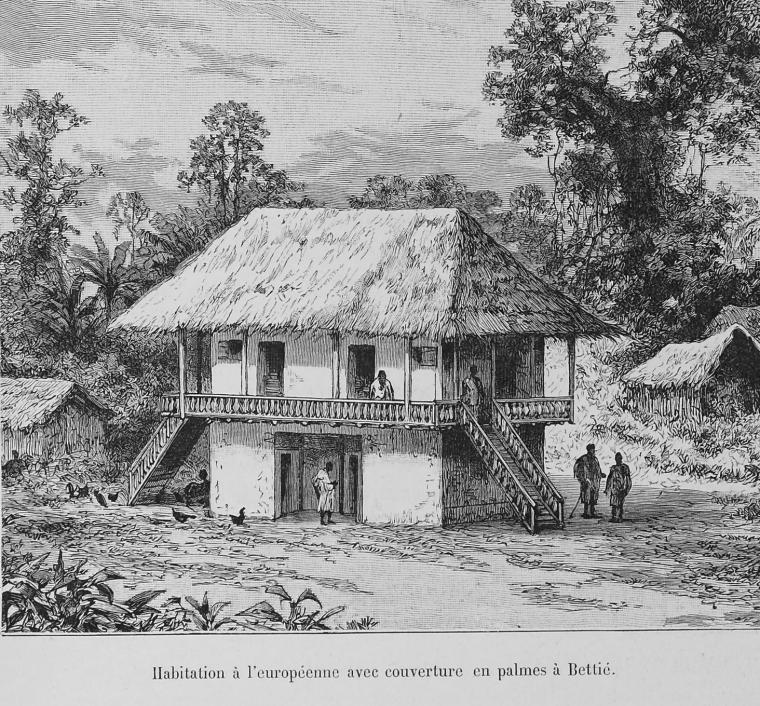
European dwelling in Bettié, 1892

Bettié is a town in south-eastern Ivory Coast. It is a sub-prefecture of and seat of Bettié Department in Indénié-Djuablin Region, Comoé District. Bettié is also a commune. The town lies on the east bank of the river that forms the boundary between Comoé and Lagunes Districts. In 2014, the population of the sub-prefecture of Bettié was 24,983.

== History ==
The Kingdom of Bettié was founded in the 18th century by the Anyi people.

== Villages ==
The ten villages of the sub-prefecture of Bettié and their population in 2014 are:

1. Bettié (8 455)
2. Akreby (2 744)
3. Kossonoukro (5 182)
4. N'zué Kouadiokro (312)
5. Nioupinbeniekro (Saibe) (1 653)
6. Abradinou (2 515)
7. Aka-Comoekro (2 054)
8. Heredougou (1 016)
9. Yere-Yere I (394)
10. Yere-Yere Ii (658)
