= Agnibilékrou =

- Town, sub-prefecture, and commune
- Location in Ivory Coast
- Coordinates: 7°13′N 3°20′W
- Country: Ivory Coast
- District: Comoé
- Region: Indénié-Djuablin
- Department: Agnibilékrou

Area
  - Total: 449 km^{2} (173 sq mi)

Population (2021 census)
  - Total: 99,501
  - Density: 222/km^{2} (574/sq mi)
  - Town: 48,611
- (2014 census)
- Time zone: UTC+0 (GMT)

Agnibilékrou is a town in eastern Ivory Coast. It is a sub-prefecture of and seat of Agnibilékrou Department in Indénié-Djuablin Region, Comoé District. Agnibilékrou is also a commune. In 2021, the population of the sub-prefecture of Agnibilékrou was 99,501.

== Villages ==
The thirteen villages of the sub-prefecture of Agnibilékrou and their population in 2014 are:

1. Agnibilekrou (47 648)
2. Agnanfoutou (2 361)
3. Assikasso (1 566)
4. Assuame (1 099)
5. Ayenou (1 417)
6. Kongodja (2 551)
7. Nianda (3 521)
8. N'zorekro (610)
9. Agnimou-Agninikro (963)
10. Epononkro (406)
11. Kangakro (1 687)
12. Tankouakankro (276)
13. Yobouakro (5 069)

== Notable residents ==
- Kouassi Brou: Ivorian Olympic swimmer

== Sister city ==
Agnibilékrou is twinned with Lafayette, Louisiana, United States.
