= Lakota, Ivory Coast =

Lakota
- Town, sub-prefecture, and commune
- Location in Ivory Coast
- Coordinates: 5°51′N 5°41′W
- Country: Ivory Coast
- District: Gôh-Djiboua
- Region: Lôh-Djiboua
- Department: Lakota

Area
  - Total: 1,020 km^{2} (390 sq mi)

Population (2021 census)
  - Total: 169,330
  - Density: 166/km^{2} (430/sq mi)
  - Town: 24,976
- (2014 census)
- Time zone: UTC+0 (GMT)

Lakota is a town in south-central Ivory Coast. It is a sub-prefecture and the seat of Lakota Department in Lôh-Djiboua Region, Gôh-Djiboua District. Lakota is also a commune.

In 2021, the population of the sub-prefecture of Lakota was 169,330.

== Villages ==
The 51 villages of the sub-prefecture of Lakota and their population in 2014 are:

1. Abatoulilié (923)
2. Akabréboua (3,390)
3. Baboué (416)
4. Dahiri (1,149)
5. Dakouritrohouin (1,102)
6. Daloboué (120)
7. Dalougoulié (286)
8. Diogoboua (2,189)
9. Djagoboua (993)
10. Djidjiri (306)
11. Djidjé Sud (410)
12. Djimon (2,067)
13. Djéléboué (427)
14. Dogoboua (1,001)
15. Dékédou (280)
16. Gaougnagbolilié (789)
17. Gazolilié (722)
18. Gbagrélilié (447)
19. Gbahiri (1,322)
20. Gbakorahoin (670)
21. Gbéga (1,043)
22. Gnakouboué 1 (1,372)
23. Gogné (1,773)
24. Gogoko (907)
25. Gragba-Dagolilié (1,289)
26. Gragbalilié (734)
27. Grand-Déboua (2,223)
28. Grogouya (1,321)
29. Guiguédou (1,396)
30. Guéhué (120)
31. Kahitohourililié (825)
32. Kogbatroko (360)
33. Koudoulilié Extension (838)
34. Koudoulilié Village (821)
35. Lakota (31,145)
36. Ligrohouin (1,957)
37. Mahouréboua (656)
38. Nassalilié (875)
39. Niakpalilié (503)
40. Niambré (732)
41. Niemanakoya (360)
42. Niémélilié (583)
43. Oliziriboué (Zozo) (2,620)
44. Ouagalilié (497)
45. Pourgo (986)
46. Satroko (1,102)
47. Séliboua (441)
48. Tapénahué (571)
49. Tragrouparéhouin (429)
50. Zokolilié (3,340)
51. Zéboua (1 444)
