= Zaranou =

- Town and sub-prefecture
- Location in Ivory Coast
- Coordinates: 6°26′N 3°22′W
- Country: Ivory Coast
- District: Comoé
- Region: Indénié-Djuablin
- Department: Abengourou

Population (2014)
  - Total: 33,539
- Time zone: UTC+0 (GMT)

Zaranou is a town in eastern Ivory Coast. It is a sub-prefecture of Abengourou Department in Indénié-Djuablin Region, Comoé District.

Zaranou was a commune until March 2012, when it became one of 1,126 communes nationwide that were abolished. In 2014, the population of the sub-prefecture of Zaranou was 33,539.

== Villages ==
The ten villages of the sub-prefecture of Zaranou and their population in 2014 are:

1. Zaranou (9,347)
2. Bébou (5,035)
3. Blekoum (3,472)
4. Bokakokoré (3,001)
5. Ehuasso Allangouanou (4,436)
6. Manfia (387)
7. M'basso Agni (2,184)
8. N'gouanda Kouadiokro (2,552)
9. Prakro (1,208)
10. Soukou-Soukou (1,917)
