= Moyen-Comoé =

Coordinates: 6°30′N 3°25′W

Moyen-Comoé Region Région du Moyen-Comoé
- Defunct region of Ivory Coast
- 1997–2011
- Location of Moyen-Comoé Region in Ivory Coast
- Capital: Abengourou
- Area
- 6,921 km^{2} (2,672 sq mi)
- History
  - Established as a first-level subdivision: 1997
  - Disestablished: 2011
- Today part of: Indénié-Djuablin Region

Moyen-Comoé Region is a defunct region of Ivory Coast. From 1997 to 2011, it was a first-level subdivision region. The region's capital was Abengourou and its area was 6,921 km^{2}. Since 2011, the area formerly encompassed by the region is the second-level Indénié-Djuablin Region in Comoé District.

== Administrative divisions ==
At the time of its dissolution, Moyen-Comoé Region was divided into three departments: Abengourou, Agnibilékrou, and Bettié.

== Abolition ==
Moyen-Comoé Region was abolished as part of the 2011 administrative reorganisation of the subdivisions of Ivory Coast. The area formerly encompassed by the region is now Indénié-Djuablin Region. Indénié-Djuablin is one of two regions in the first-level Comoé District.
