= Niablé =

- Town, sub-prefecture, and commune
- Location in Ivory Coast
- Coordinates: 6°40′N 3°16′W
- Country: Ivory Coast
- District: Comoé
- Region: Indénié-Djuablin
- Department: Abengourou

Area
  - Total: 510 km^{2} (200 sq mi)

Population (2021)
  - Total: 57,081
  - Density: 110/km^{2} (290/sq mi)
  - Town: 15,754
- (2014 census)
- Time zone: UTC+0 (GMT)

Niablé is a town in eastern Ivory Coast. It is a sub-prefecture and commune of Abengourou Department in Indénié-Djuablin Region, Comoé District. A few hundred metres southwest of the town is a border crossing with Ghana. In 2021, the population of the sub-prefecture of Niablé was 57,081.

== Villages ==
The tenth villages of the sub-prefecture of Niablé and their population in 2014 are:

1. Niablé (15 754)
2. Adjoumani-Kouassikro (991)
3. Zouhounou (5 635)
4. Abronamoue (5 274)
5. Affalikro (6 615)
6. Angouakro (1 043)
7. Assekro (602)
8. Brindoukro (2 270)
9. Diangobo (5 091)
10. Kouakou N'dramankro (1 692)
