= Divo, Ivory Coast =

Divo
- City, sub-prefecture, and commune
- Location in Ivory Coast
- Coordinates: 5°50′N 5°22′W
- Country: Ivory Coast
- District: Gôh-Djiboua
- Region: Lôh-Djiboua
- Department: Divo

Area
  - Total: 949 km^{2} (366 sq mi)

Population (2021 census)
  - Total: 294,559
  - Density: 310/km^{2} (804/sq mi)
  - City: 105,397
- (2014 census)
- Time zone: UTC+0 (GMT)

Divo is a city in southern Ivory Coast. It is a sub-prefecture of and the seat of Divo Department. It is also the seat of Lôh-Djiboua Region in Gôh-Djiboua District and a commune. In the 2014 census, the city had a population of 105,397, making Divo the ninth-most populous city in the country.

The city is served by Divo Airport.

== History ==
Divo was the seat of the Sud-Bandama region from 1997 to 2011.

== Villages ==
The 34 villages of the sub-prefecture of Nébo and their population in 2014 are:

1. Bada (8,413)
2. Baroco-Manois (532)
3. Boudoukou (5,473)
4. Brabodougou (2,439)
5. Cnra (2,784)
6. Daboré (2,045)
7. Dagrom (1,717)
8. Datta (7,788)
9. Divo (105,397)
10. Doumbaro (1,727)
11. Gazaville (1,161)
12. Gbagroubé (584)
13. Gly (682)
14. Gnahoualilié (Gnawalilié) (798)
15. Gnama (3,757)
16. Gniguédougou (948)
17. Godiléhiri (Godili Hiré) (491)
18. Godililié (627)
19. Goply (1,184)
20. Gouan (593)
21. Grobiakoko (2,537)
22. Grobiassoumé (3,111)
23. Grozo (331)
24. Guiléhiri (1,023)
25. Labodougou (5,835)
26. Léhiri-Kpenda (Léhiri Penda) (1,312)
27. Madouville (Mandouville) (941)
28. Palmci-Boubo (3,680)
29. Pétimpé (1,790)
30. Petit Bouaké (2,685)
31. Sur Les Rails (1,321)
32. Tabléguikou (1,321)
33. Yobouékro (777)
34. Ziki Diès (3,651)
