= Bettié Department =

Coordinates: 6°4′N 3°24′W

Bettié Department Département de Bettié
- Department
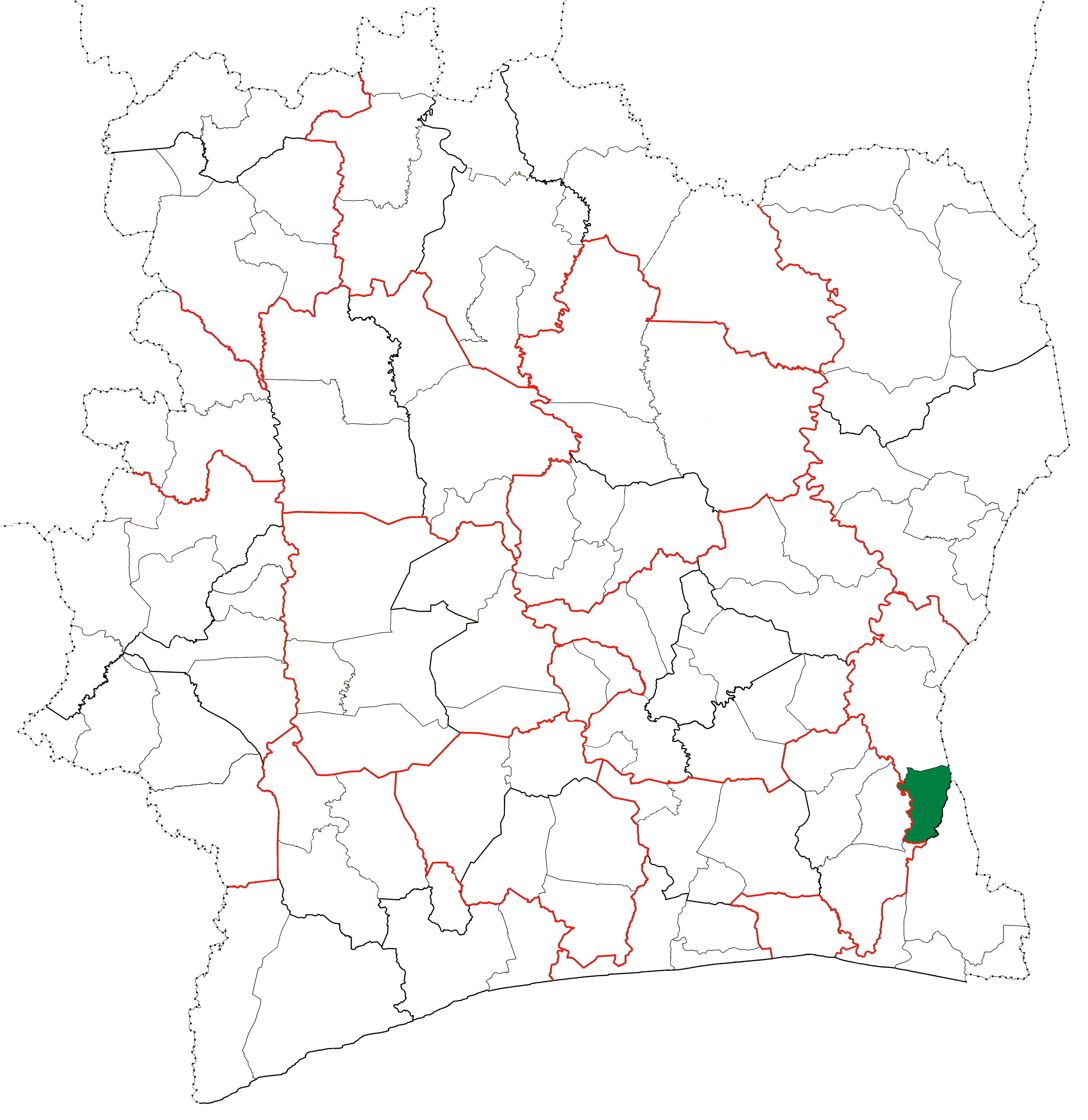
- Location in Ivory Coast. Bettié Department has retained the same boundaries since its creation in 2008.
- Country: Ivory Coast
- District: Comoé
- Region: Indénié-Djuablin
- 2008: Established as a second-level subdivision via a division of Abengourou Dept
- 2011: Converted to a third-level subdivision
- Departmental seat: Bettié

Government
  - Prefect: Bernadette Guettey

Area
  - Total: 1,110 km^{2} (430 sq mi)

Population (2021 census)
  - Total: 69,640
  - Density: 62.7/km^{2} (162/sq mi)
- Time zone: UTC+0 (GMT)

Bettié Department is a department of Indénié-Djuablin Region in Comoé District, Ivory Coast. In 2021, its population was 69,640 and its seat is the settlement of Bettié. The sub-prefectures of the department are Bettié and Diamarakro.

== History ==
Bettié Department was created in 2008 as a second-level subdivision via a split-off from Abengourou Department. At its creation, it was part of Moyen-Comoé Region.

In 2011, districts were introduced as new first-level subdivisions of Ivory Coast. At the same time, regions were reorganised and became second-level subdivisions and all departments were converted into third-level subdivisions. At this time, Bettié Department became part of Indénié-Djuablin Region in Comoé District.
