= Goudouko =

- Town and sub-prefecture
- Location in Ivory Coast
- Coordinates: 5°44′N 5°37′W
- Country: Ivory Coast
- District: Gôh-Djiboua
- Region: Lôh-Djiboua
- Department: Lakota

Population (2014)
  - Total: 26,641
- Time zone: UTC+0 (GMT)

Goudouko is a town in southern Ivory Coast. It is a sub-prefecture of Lakota Department in Lôh-Djiboua Region, Gôh-Djiboua District.

Goudouko was a commune until March 2012, when it became one of 1,126 communes nationwide that were abolished.

In 2014, the population of the sub-prefecture of Goudouko was 26,641.

== Villages ==
The eight villages of the sub-prefecture of Goudouko and their population in 2014 are:

1. Akridou-Laddé (6,383)
2. Dougroulilié (1,070)
3. Gbogoudou (1,003)
4. Goudouko (6,026)
5. Kazéribéri (5,719)
6. Kouassililié (2,256)
7. Niazaroko (1,893)
8. Zozo-Oliziriboué (2,291)
