= Agnibilékrou Department =

Coordinates: 7°13′N 3°20′W

Agnibilékrou Department Département d'Agnibilékrou
- Department
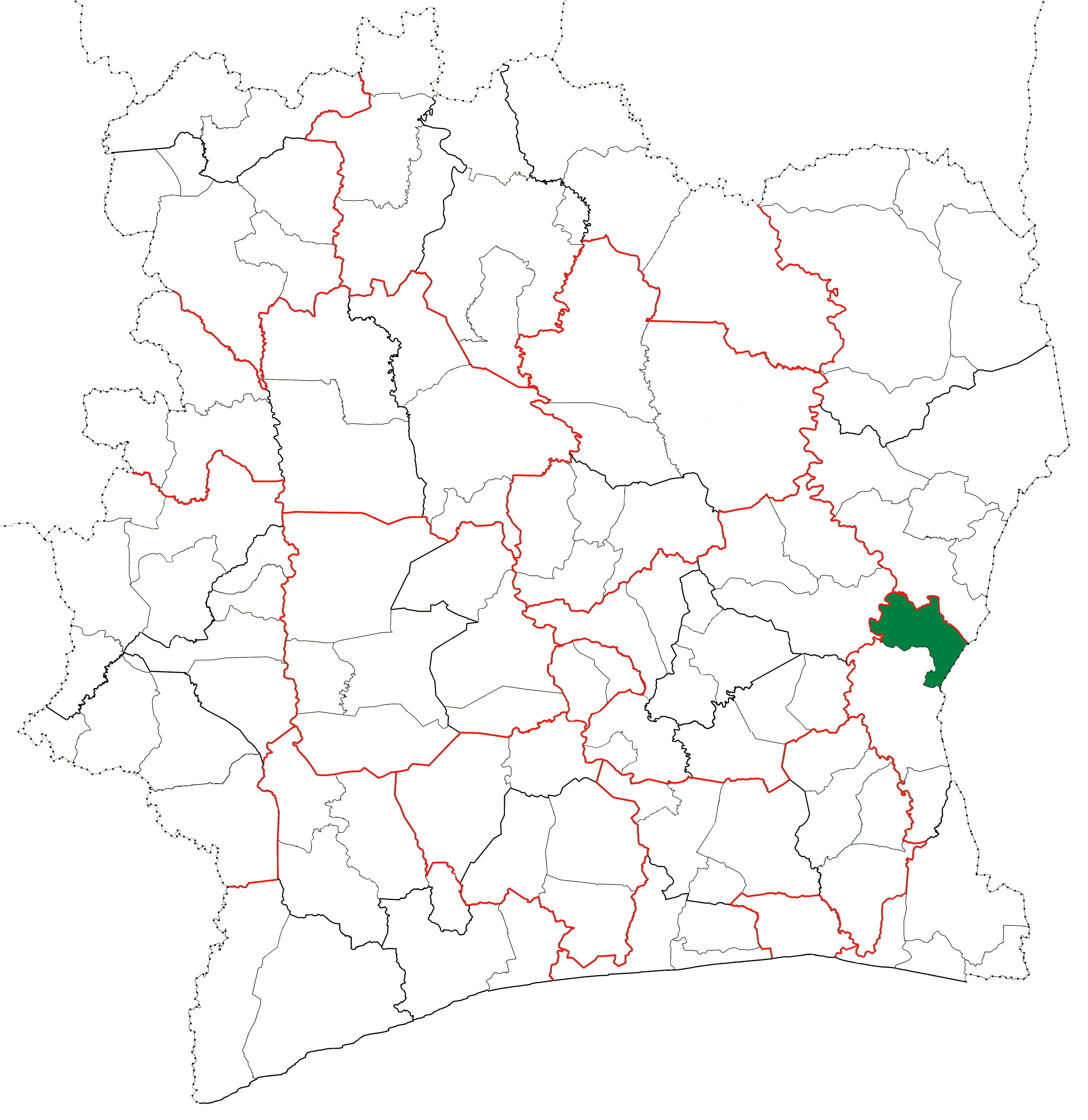
- Location in Ivory Coast. Agnibilékrou Department has retained the same boundaries since its creation in 1995.
- Country: Ivory Coast
- District: Comoé
- Region: Indénié-Djuablin
- 1995: Established as a first-level subdivision via a division of Abengourou Dept
- 1997: Converted to a second-level subdivision
- 2011: Converted to a third-level subdivision
- Departmental seat: Agnibilékrou

Government
  - Prefect: Souleymane Bamba

Area
  - Total: 1,790 km^{2} (690 sq mi)

Population (2021)
  - Total: 216,264
  - Density: 121/km^{2} (313/sq mi)
- Time zone: UTC+0 (GMT)

Agnibilékrou Department is a department of Indénié-Djuablin Region in Comoé District, Ivory Coast. In 2021, its population was 216,264 and its seat is the settlement of Agnibilékrou. The sub-prefectures of the department are Agnibilékrou, Akoboissué, Damé, Duffrébo, and Tanguélan.

== History ==
Agnibilékrou Department was created in 1995 as a first-level subdivision via a split-off from Abengourou Department. It was the final department created prior to the 1997 conversion of departments into the second-level subdivisions of Ivory Coast.

In 1997, regions were introduced as new first-level subdivisions of Ivory Coast; as a result, all departments were converted into second-level subdivisions. Agnibilékrou Department was included in Moyen-Comoé Region.

In 2011, districts were introduced as new first-level subdivisions of Ivory Coast. At the same time, regions were reorganised and became second-level subdivisions and all departments were converted into third-level subdivisions. At this time, Agnibilékrou Department became part of Indénié-Djuablin Region in Comoé District. In 2014, the population of the sub-prefecture of Duffrébo was 42,426.
