= Divo Department =

Coordinates: 5°50′N 5°22′W

Divo Department Département de Divo
- Department
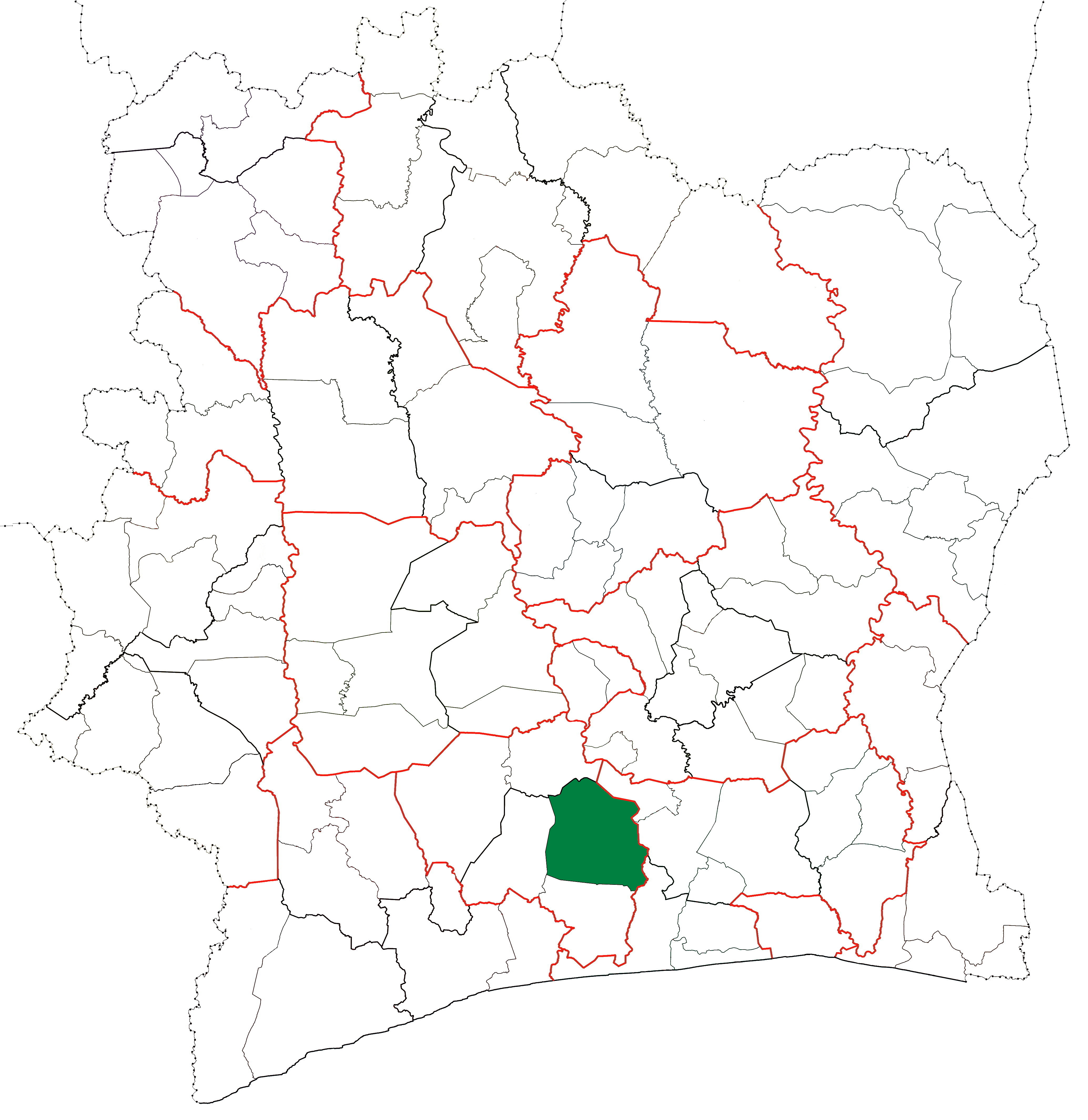
- Location in Ivory Coast. Divo Department has had these boundaries since 2009.
- Country: Ivory Coast
- District: Gôh-Djiboua
- Region: Lôh-Djiboua
- 1969: Established as a first-level subdivision
- 1980: Divided to create Lakota Dept
- 1997: Converted to a second-level subdivision
- 2008: Divided to create Fresco Dept
- 2009: Divided to create Guitry Dept
- 2011: Converted to a third-level subdivision
- Departmental seat: Divo

Government
  - Prefect: Joseph Kpan Droh

Area
  - Total: 3,520 km^{2} (1,360 sq mi)

Population (2021 census)
  - Total: 571,688
  - Density: 162/km^{2} (421/sq mi)
- Time zone: UTC+0 (GMT)

Divo Department is a department of Lôh-Djiboua Region in Gôh-Djiboua District, Ivory Coast. In 2021, its population was 571,688 and its seat is the settlement of Divo. The sub-prefectures of the department are Chiépo, Didoko, Divo, Hiré, Nébo, Ogoudou, and Zégo.

== History ==
Divo Department was created in 1969 as one of the 24 new departments that were created to take the place of the six departments that were being abolished. It was created from territory that was formerly part of Sud Department. Using current boundaries as a reference, from 1969 to 1980 the department occupied the territory of Lôh-Djiboua Region plus Fresco Department.

In 1980, Divo Department was divided to create Lakota Department. In 1997, regions were introduced as new first-level subdivisions of Ivory Coast; as a result, all departments were converted into second-level subdivisions. Divo Department was included in Sud-Bandama Region.

Divo Department was divided a second time in 2008 to create Fresco Department and a third time in 2009 to create Guitry Department.

In 2011, districts were introduced as new first-level subdivisions of Ivory Coast. At the same time, regions were reorganised and became second-level subdivisions and all departments were converted into third-level subdivisions. At this time, Divo Department became part of Lôh-Djiboua Region in Gôh-Djiboua District.

=== Maps of historical boundaries ===
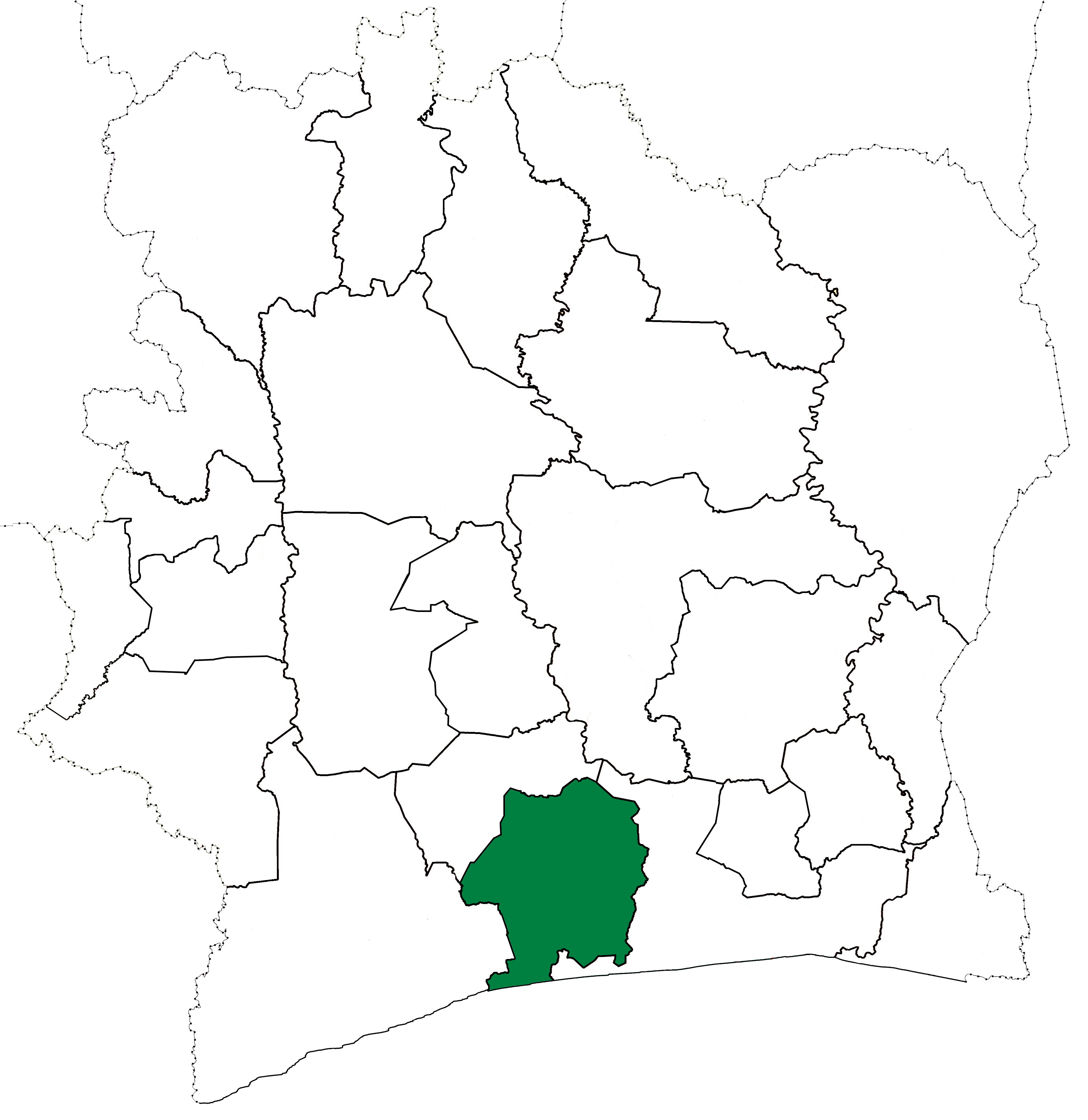
Divo Department upon its creation in 1969. It kept these boundaries until 1980, but other departments began to be divided in 1974.

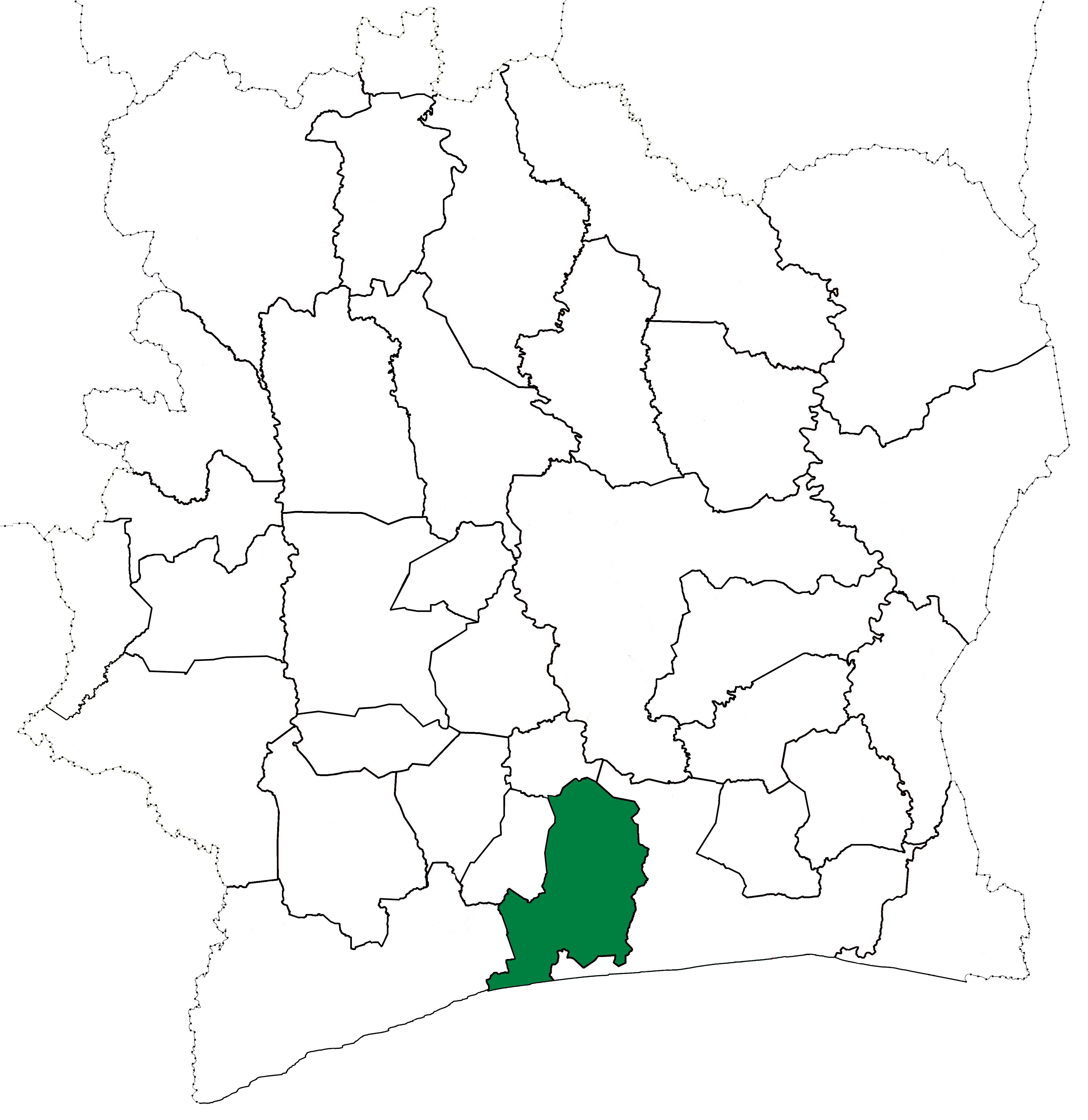
Divo Department from 1980 to 2008. (Other subdivision boundaries began to change in 1988.)

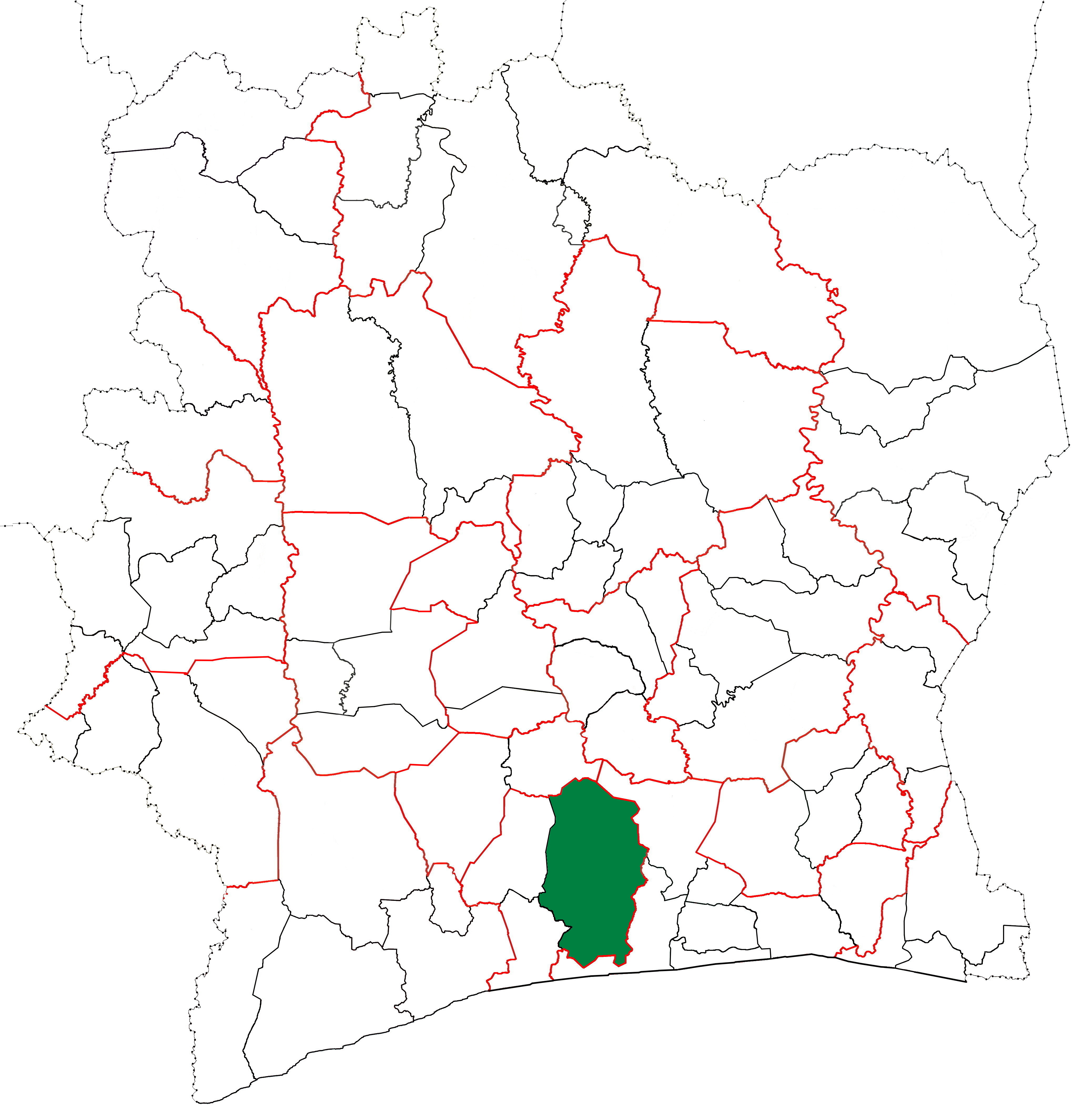
Divo Department from 2008 to 2009.
