= Abengourou Department =

Coordinates: 6°44′N 3°29′W

Abengourou Department Département d'Abengourou
- Department
- Location in Ivory Coast. Abengourou Department has had these boundaries since 2008.
- Country: Ivory Coast
- District: Comoé
- Region: Indénié-Djuablin
- 1969: Established as a first-level subdivision
- 1995: Divided to create Agnibilékrou Dept
- 1997: Converted to a second-level subdivision
- 2008: Divided to create Bettié Dept
- 2011: Converted to a third-level subdivision
- Departmental seat: Abengourou

Government
  - Prefect: Fadi Ouattara

Area
  - Total: 4,010 km^{2} (1,550 sq mi)

Population (2021 census)
  - Total: 430,539
  - Density: 107/km^{2} (278/sq mi)
- Time zone: UTC+0 (GMT)

Abengourou Department is a department of Indénié-Djuablin Region in Comoé District, Ivory Coast. In 2021, its population was 430,539 and its seat is the settlement of Abengourou. The sub-prefectures of the department are Abengourou, Amélékia, Aniassué, Ebilassokro, Niablé, Yakassé-Féyassé, and Zaranou.

== History ==
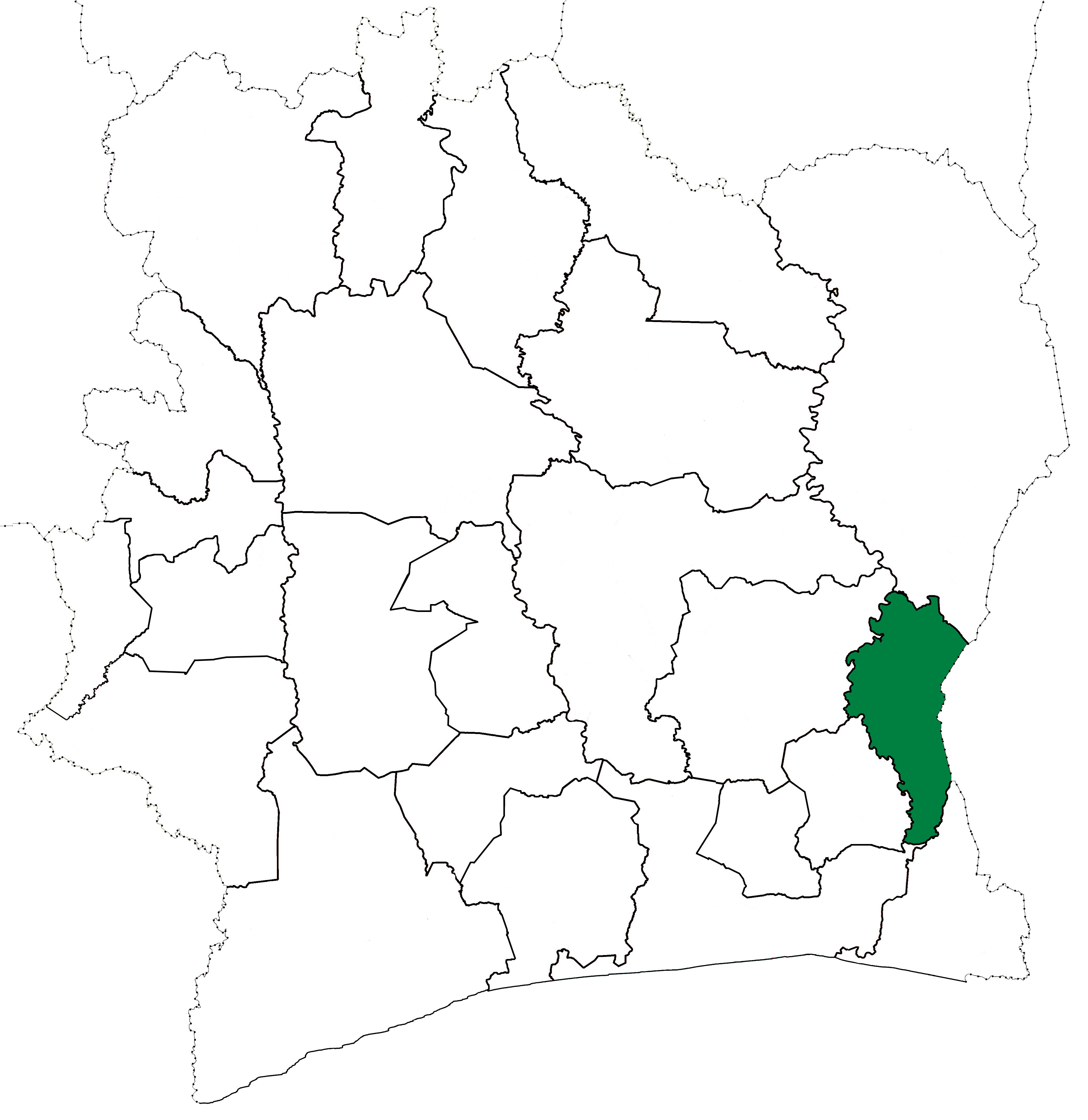
Abengourou Department upon its creation in 1969. It kept these boundaries until 1995, but other departments began to be divided in 1974.

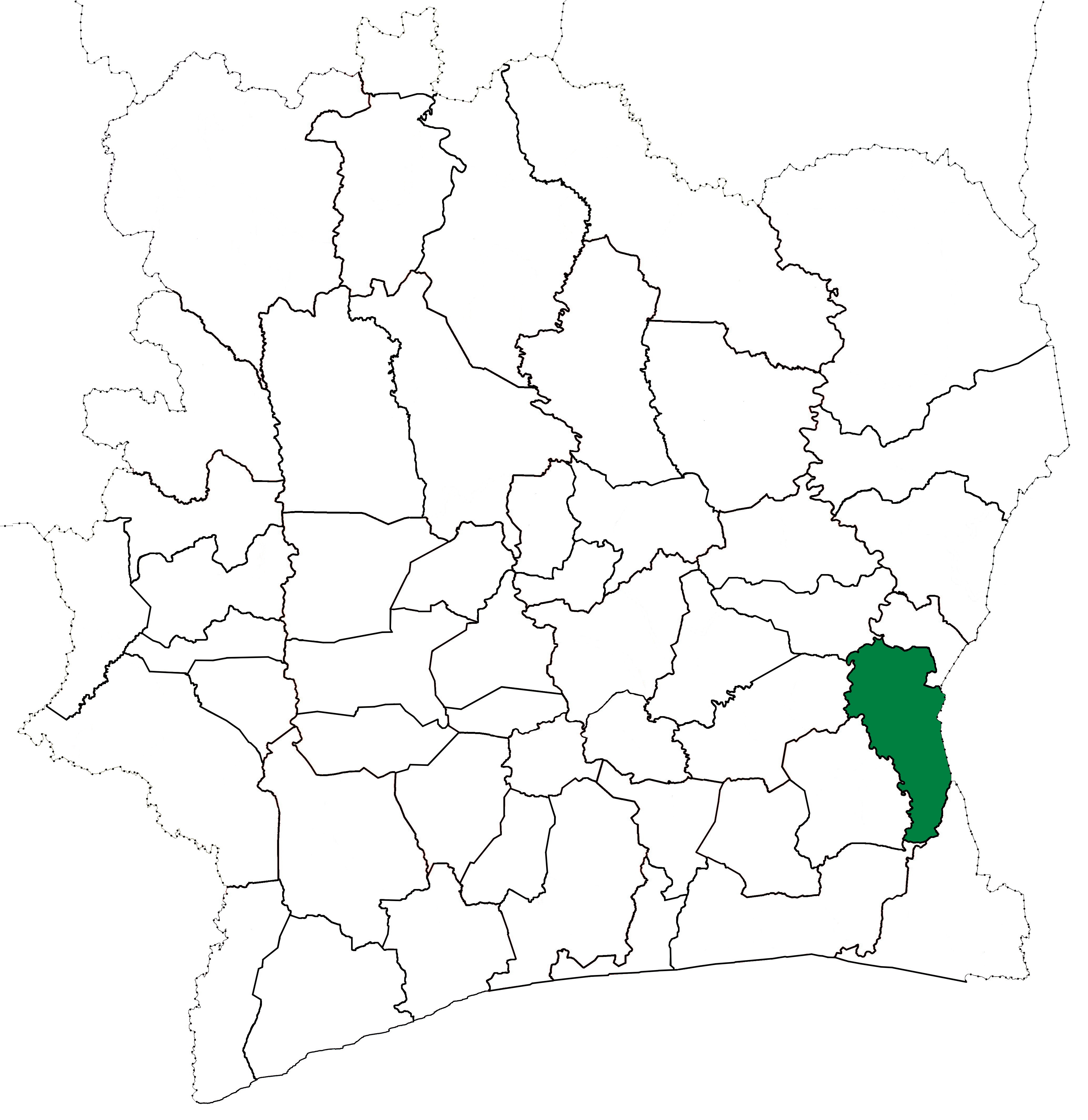
Abengourou Department from 1995 to 2008. (Other changes to subdivisions of Côte d'Ivoire began in 1997.)

Abengourou Department was created in 1969 as one of the 24 new departments that were created to take the place of the six departments that were being abolished. It was created from territory that was formerly part of Est Department. Using current boundaries as a reference, the department occupied the entire territory that is currently Indénié-Djuablin Region.

In 1995, the department was split in order to create Agnibilékrou Department. In 1997, regions were introduced as new first-level subdivisions of Ivory Coast; as a result, all departments were converted into second-level subdivisions. Abengourou was included in Moyen-Comoé Region.

Abengourou Department was split again in 2008 to create Bettié Department.

In 2011, districts were introduced as new first-level subdivisions of Ivory Coast. At the same time, regions were reorganised and became second-level subdivisions and all departments were converted into third-level subdivisions. At this time, Abengourou Department became part of Indénié-Djuablin Region in Comoé District.
