= Lakota Department =

Coordinates: 5°51′N 5°41′W

Lakota Department Département de Lakota
- Department
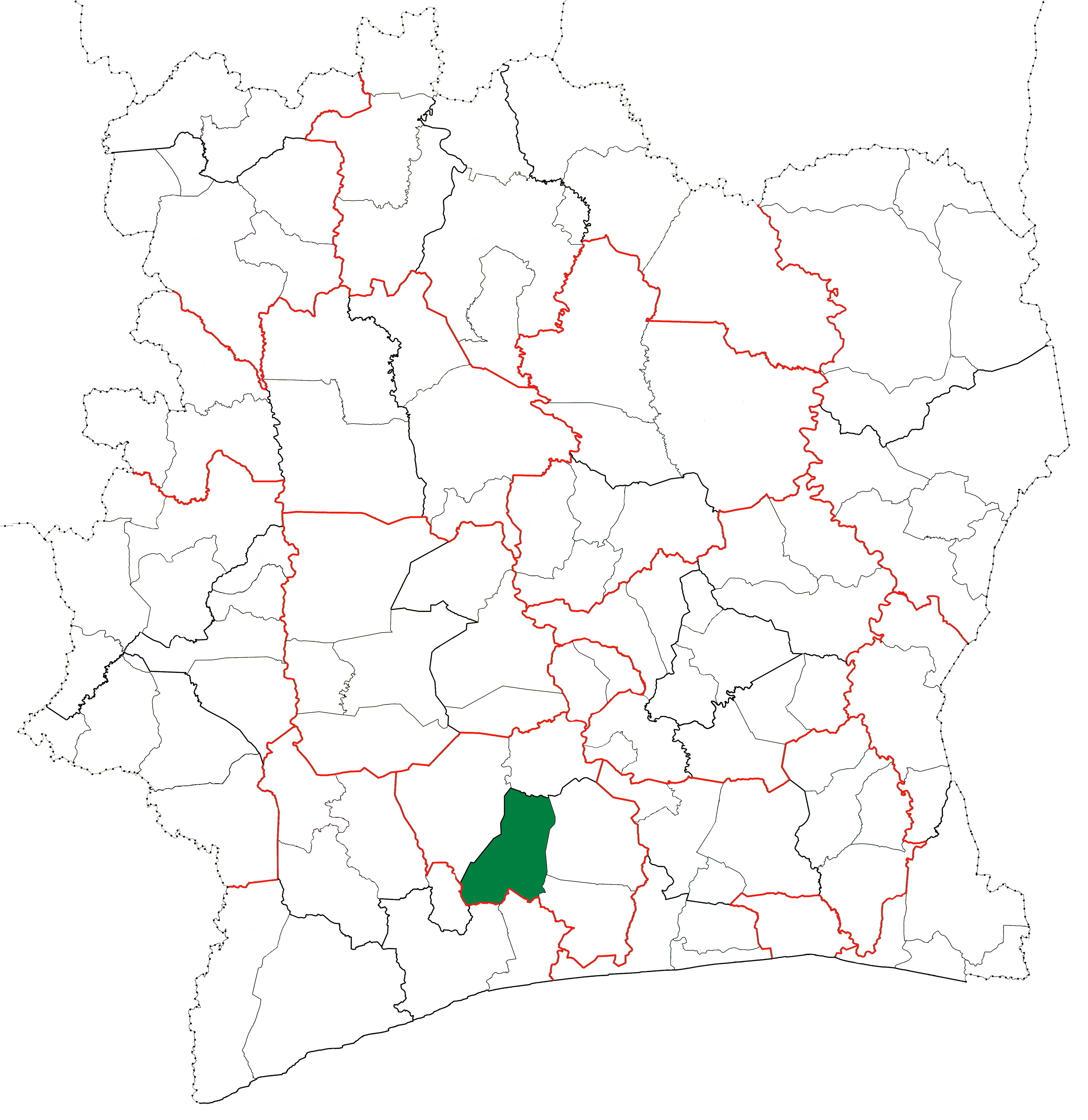
- Location in Ivory Coast. Lakota Department has retained the same boundaries since its creation in 1980.
- Country: Ivory Coast
- District: Gôh-Djiboua
- Region: Lôh-Djiboua
- 1980: Established as a first-level subdivision via division of Divo Dept
- 1997: Converted to a second-level subdivision
- 2011: Converted to a third-level subdivision
- Departmental seat: Lakota

Government
  - Prefect: Yahala Coulibaly

Area
  - Total: 2,780 km^{2} (1,070 sq mi)

Population (2021 census)
  - Total: 334,235
  - Density: 120/km^{2} (311/sq mi)
- Time zone: UTC+0 (GMT)

The Lakota Department is a department of the Lôh-Djiboua Region in Gôh-Djiboua District, Ivory Coast. In 2021, its population was 334,235 and its seat is the settlement of Lakota. The sub-prefectures of the department are Djidji, Gagoré, Goudouko, Lakota, Niambézaaria, and Zikisso.

Lakota Department was created in 1980 as a split-off from Divo Department. In 1997, regions were introduced as new first-level subdivisions of Ivory Coast; as a result, all departments were converted into second-level subdivisions. Lakota Department was included in the Sud-Bandama Region.

In 2011, districts were introduced as new first-level subdivisions of Ivory Coast. At the same time, regions were reorganised and became second-level subdivisions and all departments were converted into third-level subdivisions. At this time, Lakota Department became part of Lôh-Djiboua Region in the Gôh-Djiboua District.
