= Indénié-Djuablin =

Coordinates: 6°44′N 3°29′W

Indénié-Djuablin Region Région de l'Indénié-Djuablin
- Region
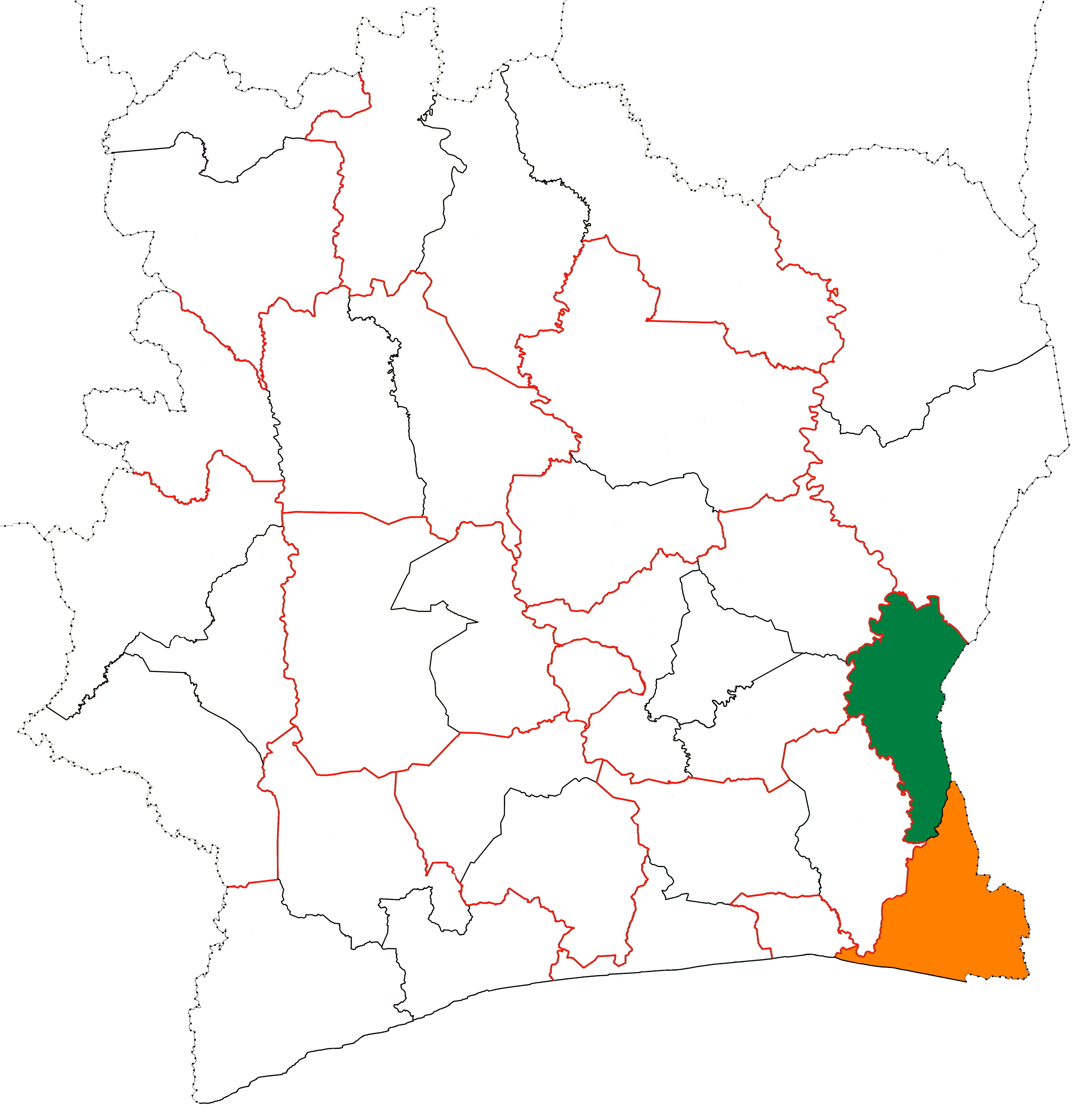
- Location of Indénié-Djuablin Region (green) in Ivory Coast and in Comoé District
- Country: Ivory Coast
- District: Comoé
- Established: 2011
- Regional seat: Abengourou

Government
  - Prefect: Fadi Ouattara
  - Council President: Ehouman Boko Hubert

Area
  - Total: 6,910 km^{2} (2,670 sq mi)

Population (2021 census)
  - Total: 716,443
  - Density: 104/km^{2} (269/sq mi)
- Time zone: UTC+0 (GMT)

Indénié-Djuablin Region is one of the 31 regions of Ivory Coast. Since its establishment in 2011, it has been one of two regions in Comoé District. The region's seat is Abengourou. Other important towns are Agnibilekrou, Bettié and Niablé. The region's area is 6910 km^{2}, and at the 2021 census, it had a population of 716,443.

== History ==
As part of the 2011 administrative reorganization of the subdivisions of Ivory Coast, the first-level Moyen-Comoé Region was converted into the second-level Indénié-Djuablin Region, with no change in territory.

== Departments ==
Indénié-Djuablin is currently divided into three departments: Abengourou, Agnibilékrou, and Bettié.
