= Lôh-Djiboua =

Coordinates: 5°50′N 5°22′W

Lôh-Djiboua Region Région du Lôh-Djiboua
- Region
- Seal

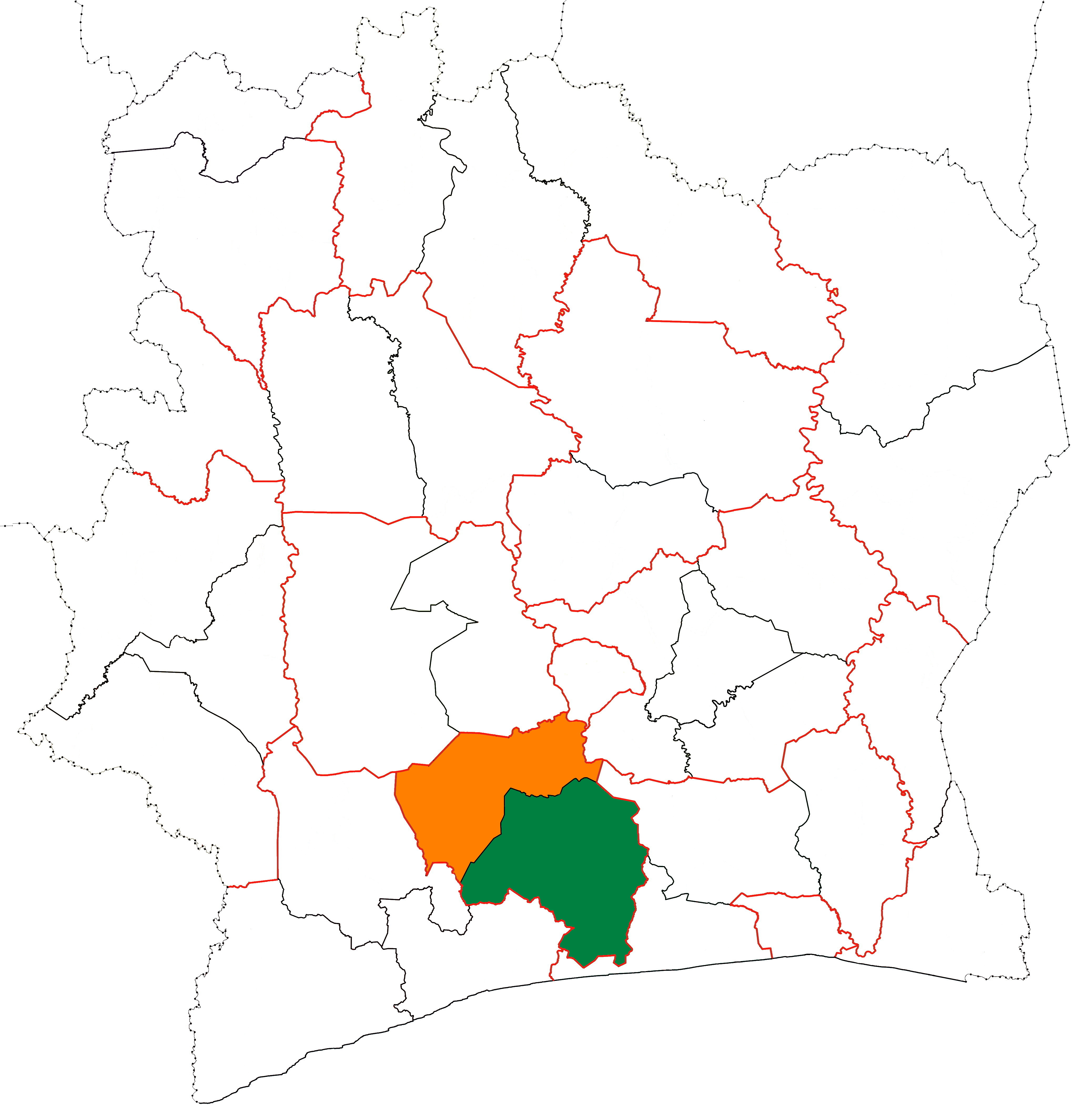
- Location of Lôh-Djiboua Region (green) in Ivory Coast and in Gôh-Djiboua District
- Country: Ivory Coast
- District: Gôh-Djiboua
- 2011: Established
- Regional seat: Divo

Government
  - Prefect: Joseph Kpan Droh
  - Council President: Komenan Tchekoura Rolland Zakpa

Area
  - Total: 8,790 km^{2} (3,390 sq mi)

Population (2021 census)
  - Total: 1,103,158
  - Density: 126/km^{2} (325/sq mi)
- Time zone: UTC+0 (GMT)
- Website: lohdjiboua.org

Lôh-Djiboua Region is one of the 31 regions of Ivory Coast. Since its creation in 2011, it has been one of two regions in Gôh-Djiboua District. The regional seat is Divo and the region's area is 10,650 km². At the 2021 census, the region had a population of 1,103,158.

== History ==
Lôh-Djiboua Region was created as part of the 2011 reorganisation of the subdivisions of Ivory Coast. Prior to this, the territory that is now Lôh-Djiboua constituted the majority of the first-level division Sud-Bandama Region, which also included what is now Fresco Department. At the reorganisation, the territory of Fresco Department was transferred to Bas-Sassandra District and the remainder of Sud-Bandama became the second-level division Lôh-Djiboua. Lôh-Djiboua was combined with Gôh Region to form the new first-level division Gôh-Djiboua District.

== Departments ==
Lôh-Djiboua is currently divided into three departments: Divo, Guitry, and Lakota.
