= Comoé District =

District of Ivory Coast

Coordinates: 6°44′N 3°29′W

Comoé District District du Comoé
- District
- Country: Ivory Coast
- Established: 2011
- Capital: Abengourou

Area
  - Total: 14,150 km^{2} (5,460 sq mi)

Population (2021)
  - Total: 1,501,336
  - Density: 106.1/km^{2} (274.8/sq mi)
- HDI (2022): 0.582 medium · 2nd of 14

Comoé District (French: District du Comoé; pronounced [ko.mo.e], named for the Komoé River) is one of fourteen administrative districts of Ivory Coast. The district is located in the southeast corner of the country, bordering Ghana to the east, Zanzan District to the north, Lacs District and Lagunes District to the west, and the Atlantic Ocean to the south. The capital of the district is Abengourou.

== Creation ==
Comoé District was created in a 2011 administrative reorganisation of the subdivisions of Ivory Coast. The territory of the district was composed by merging the former regions of Moyen-Comoé and Sud-Comoé.

== Administrative divisions ==
Comoé District is currently subdivided into two regions and the following departments:

- Indénié-Djuablin Region (formerly Moyen-Comoé Region) (region seat also in Abengourou)
  - Abengourou Department
  - Agnibilékrou Department
  - Bettié Department
- Sud-Comoé Region (region seat in Aboisso)
  - Aboisso Department
  - Adiaké Department
  - Grand-Bassam Department
  - Tiapoum Department

== Population ==
According to the 2021 census, Comoé District has a population of 1,501,366.

=== Religion ===
Religion in Comoé (2021 census)
Religion	Percent
Christianity	43.5%
Islam	43.0%
None	9.7%
Traditional	0.8%
Other	3.0%

Comoé has a religiously diverse population. According to the 2021 census, Christianity is the plurality religion in the district (43.5%), followed closely by Islam (43.0%) and those with no religion (9.7%). A smaller share of residents adhere to traditional religions or other faiths.
