= Gouenzou =

- Village
- Location in Ivory Coast
- Coordinates: 10°6′N 7°50′W
- Country: Ivory Coast
- District: Denguélé
- Region: Folon
- Department: Minignan
- Sub-prefecture: Sokoro
- Time zone: UTC+0 (GMT)

Gouenzou is a village in north-western Ivory Coast. It is in the sub-prefecture of Sokoro, Minignan Department, Folon Region, Denguélé District.

Gouenzou was a commune until March 2012, when it became one of 1,126 communes nationwide that were abolished.
