= Kokoun =

- Village
- Location in Ivory Coast
- Coordinates: 9°30′N 7°2′W
- Country: Ivory Coast
- District: Denguélé
- Region: Kabadougou
- Department: Madinani
- Sub-prefecture: Madinani
- Time zone: UTC+0 (GMT)

Kokoun is a village in north-western Ivory Coast. It is in the sub-prefecture of Madinani, Madinani Department, Kabadougou Region, Denguélé District.

Kokoun was a commune until March 2012, when it became one of 1,126 communes nationwide that were abolished.
