= Sokorodougou =

- Village
- Location in Ivory Coast
- Coordinates: 9°2′N 7°35′W
- Country: Ivory Coast
- District: Denguélé
- Region: Kabadougou
- Department: Odienné
- Sub-prefecture: Bako
- Time zone: UTC+0 (GMT)

Sokorodougou is a village in northwestern Ivory Coast. It is in the sub-prefecture of Bako, Odienné Department, Kabadougou Region, Denguélé District.

Sokorodougou was a commune until March 2012, when it became one of 1,126 communes nationwide that were abolished.
