= Dabadougou-Mafélé =

- Village
- Location in Ivory Coast
- Coordinates: 9°44′N 7°52′W
- Country: Ivory Coast
- District: Denguélé
- Region: Kabadougou
- Department: Gbéléban
- Sub-prefecture: Samango
- Time zone: UTC+0 (GMT)

Dabadougou-Mafélé is a village in north-western Ivory Coast. It is in the sub-prefecture of Samango, Gbéléban Department, Kabadougou Region, Denguélé District.

Dabadougou-Mafélé was a commune until March 2012, when it became one of 1,126 communes nationwide that were abolished.
