= Férémandougou =

- Village
- Location in Ivory Coast
- Coordinates: 8°57′N 7°34′W
- Country: Ivory Coast
- District: Denguélé
- Region: Kabadougou
- Department: Odienné
- Sub-prefecture: Bako
- Time zone: UTC+0 (GMT)

Férémandougou is a village in north-western Ivory Coast. It is in the sub-prefecture of Bako, Odienné Department, Kabadougou Region, Denguélé District. It lies just a few kilometres north of the border of Woroba District. Férémandougou is situated between two towns, Borotou, located 22 kilometres (14 mi) south, and Bako, located 20 kilometres (12 mi) north.

Férémandougou was a commune until March 2012, when it became one of 1,126 communes nationwide that were abolished.
