= Fengolo =

Fengolo Fangolo
- Town and sub-prefecture
- Location in Ivory Coast
- Coordinates: 9°55′N 6°54′W
- Country: Ivory Coast
- District: Denguélé
- Region: Kabadougou
- Department: Madinani

Population (2014)
  - Total: 5,929
- Time zone: UTC+0 (GMT)

Fengolo (also spelled Fangolo) is a town in north-western Ivory Coast. It is a sub-prefecture of Madinani Department in Kabadougou Region, Denguélé District. The town borders the Savanes District to the east, and is situated approximately 24 kilometres (15 mi) north of the town of Madinani.

Fengolo was a commune until March 2012, when it became one of 1,126 communes nationwide that were abolished.

In 2014, the population of the sub-prefecture of Fengolo was 5,929.

== Villages ==
The five villages of the sub-prefecture of Fengolo and their population in 2014 are:

1. Fengolo (2,467)
2. Kakoro (812)
3. Tiébala (549)
4. Tiolasso (1,061)
5. Tiomozomon (1,040)
