= Séguélon =

- Town, sub-prefecture, and commune
- Location in Ivory Coast
- Coordinates: 9°21′N 7°7′W
- Country: Ivory Coast
- District: Denguélé
- Region: Kabadougou
- Department: Séguélon

Population (2014)
  - Total: 15,898
- Time zone: UTC+0 (GMT)

Séguélon is a town in northwestern Ivory Coast. It is a sub-prefecture of and the seat of Séguélon Department in Kabadougou Region, Denguélé District. Séguélon is also a commune. The town is located about 35 kilometres (22 mi) south-west of Madinani.

In 2014, the population of the sub-prefecture of Séguélon was 15,898.

== Villages ==
The 17 villages of the sub-prefecture of Séguélon and their population in 2014 are:

1. Farakoro (2 218)
2. Gbangué (879)
3. Moussadougou (664)
4. Namasso (469)
5. N'déou (394)
6. Nianzongo (462)
7. Ningoun (523)
8. Sengbani (581)
9. Séguélon (3 568)
10. Sianso-Koroni (536)
11. Timbani (687)
12. Zangohoba (1 020)
13. Zangoho-Sokoura (158)
14. Lillé (658)
15. Lingoho (1 265)
16. Tiemba (833)
17. Zébénin (983)
