= Samatiguila =

Samatiguila Samatiglia
- Town, sub-prefecture, and commune
- Location in Ivory Coast
- Coordinates: 9°49′N 7°34′W
- Country: Ivory Coast
- District: Denguélé
- Region: Kabadougou
- Department: Samatiguila

Population (2014)
  - Total: 8,933
- Time zone: UTC+0 (GMT)

Samatiguila (also spelled Samatiglia) is a town in northwestern Ivory Coast. It is a sub-prefecture of and the seat of Samatiguila Department in Kabadougou Region, Denguélé District. Samatiguila is also a commune. It is located approximately 15 km north of Kimbirila-Sud, and 40 km north of Odienné, the nearest main town and the capital of the Denguélé District. Samatiguila is well known among Ivorians for the large number of traders and bus companies that originate from the town but that operate all over Ivory Coast.

The Mosquée de Samatiguila ou Missiriba is an adobe mosque in Samatiguila. Built in the 18th century, it was inscribed on the UNESCO World Heritage List in 2021 (along with other mosques in northern Ivory Coast) because of its outstanding representation of Sudano-Sahelian architecture.

The French explorer René Caillié spent five days in Samatiguila in July 1827 on his journey from Boké, in present-day Guinea, to Timbuktu in Mali. He was travelling with a caravan transporting kola nuts to Djenné. He described his visit in his book Travels through Central Africa to Timbuctoo:

It was nearly nine o'clock in the morning when we made our appearance at Sambatikila [Samatiguila] which is surrounded by a double wall ten or eleven feet high and ten inches thick. ... Sambatikila is a large village ... it is independent and inhabited by Mandingo Musulmans. It is much larger than Kankan but not so well peopled; there are many large vacant places in the interior of the village; the streets are narrow, crooked, and at this season of the year, full of mud.
