= Kaniasso =

- Town, sub-prefecture, and commune
- Location in Ivory Coast
- Coordinates: 9°49′N 7°31′W
- Country: Ivory Coast
- District: Denguélé
- Region: Folon
- Department: Kaniasso

Population (2014)
  - Total: 13,600
- Time zone: UTC+0 (GMT)

Kaniasso is a town in north-western Ivory Coast. It is a sub-prefecture of and the seat of Kaniasso Department in Folon Region, Denguélé District. Kaniasso is also a commune.

In 2014, the population of the sub-prefecture of Kaniasso was 13,600.

== Villages ==
The 13 villages of the sub-prefecture of Kaniasso and their population in 2014 are:

1. Kaniasso (2 545)
2. Koro-Oulé (1 468)
3. Siola (326)
4. Banankoro (2 291)
5. Boumbala (154)
6. Fiéla (423)
7. Karala (761)
8. Nafadougou (1 802)
9. Sananférédougou (857)
10. Sokouraba-Tron (1 494)
11. Tiéla (313)
12. Touba-Tron (980)
13. Ziémougoula (186)
