= Gbongaha =

- Town and sub-prefecture
- Location in Ivory Coast
- Coordinates: 9°7′N 6°54′W
- Country: Ivory Coast
- District: Denguélé
- Region: Kabadougou
- Department: Séguélon

Population (2014)
  - Total: 10,407
- Time zone: UTC+0 (GMT)

Gbongaha is a town in north-western Ivory Coast. It is a sub-prefecture of Séguélon Department in Kabadougou Region, Denguélé District.

Gbongaha was a commune until March 2012, when it became one of 1,126 communes nationwide that were abolished.

In 2014, the population of the sub-prefecture of Gbongaha was 10,407.

== Villages ==
The 6 villages of the sub-prefecture of Gbongaha and their populations in 2014 are:

1. Gbongaha (3,934);
2. Karabiri (2,414);
3. Ouanégué (1,067);
4. Siréba (1,108);
5. Sirédéni 1 (1,051);
6. Sirédéni 2 (833).
