= Tienko =

- Town, sub-prefecture, and commune
- Location in Ivory Coast
- Coordinates: 10°13′N 7°29′W
- Country: Ivory Coast
- District: Denguélé
- Region: Folon
- Department: Minignan

Population (2014)
  - Total: 12,042
- Time zone: UTC+0 (GMT)

Texte en italique

Tienko is a town in northwestern Ivory Coast. It is a sub-prefecture and commune of Minignan Department in Folon Region, Denguélé District.

In 2014, the population of the sub-prefecture of Tienko was 12,042.

== Villages ==
The 13 villages of the sub-prefecture of Tienko and their population in 2014 are:

1. Kéhi (550)
2. Kémissiga (177)
3. Mazéla (555)
4. M'bana (656)
5. Tienko (3 049)
6. Koliko (878)
7. Kouban (1 193)
8. Bokouna (71)
9. Kabangoué (1 291)
10. Kotoula (1 331)
11. Diolola (864)
12. Kongohila 1 (876)
13. Missamahana (551)
