= Bougousso =

- Town and sub-prefecture
- Location in Ivory Coast
- Coordinates: 9°16′N 7°50′W
- Country: Ivory Coast
- District: Denguélé
- Region: Kabadougou
- Department: Odienné

Population (2014)
  - Total: 6,722
- Time zone: UTC+0 (GMT)

Bougousso is a town in north-western Ivory Coast. It is a sub-prefecture of Odienné Department in Kabadougou Region, Denguélé District, near to the border with Guinea.

Bougousso was a commune until March 2012, when it became one of 1,126 communes nationwide that were abolished.

In 2014, the population of the sub-prefecture of Bougousso was 6,722.

== Villages ==
The 10 villages of the sub-prefecture of Bougousso and their population in 2014 are

1. Bengo (207)
2. Bougousso (1,378)
3. Djavahana (401)
4. Fassoronzo (586)
5. Féréfougoula (1,214)
6. Foulla (1,174)
7. Kessédougou (572)
8. Niamatogola (639)
9. Sarala (469)
10. Signènè (82)
