= Mahandiana-Sokourani =

Mahandiana-Sokourani Mahandiana-Soukourani
- Town and sub-prefecture
- Location in Ivory Coast
- Coordinates: 10°15′N 6°41′W
- Country: Ivory Coast
- District: Denguélé
- Region: Folon
- Department: Kaniasso

Population (2014)
  - Total: 26,026
- Time zone: UTC+0 (GMT)

Mahandiana-Sokourani (also spelled Mahandiana-Soukourani) is a town in north-western Ivory Coast. It is a sub-prefecture of Kaniasso Department in Folon Region, Denguélé District.

Mahandiana-Sokourani was a commune until March 2012, when it became one of 1,126 communes nationwide that were abolished.

In 2014, the population of the sub-prefecture of Mahandiana-Sokourani was 26,026 .

== Villages ==
The 12 villages of the sub-prefecture of Mahandiana-Sokourani and their population in 2014 are:

- Fanfala (1,113)
- Gbéguéni (925)
- Gouéya (6,141)
- Mahandiana-Sobala (2,087)
- Mahandiana-Sokourani (3,014)
- Ouassangalasso (1,349)
- Ouelli (4,911)
- Sémé (1,420)
- Tokala (1,564)
- Wahiré (1,939)
- Zambla (848)
- Zesso (715)
