= Gbéléban =

- Town and sub-prefecture
- Location in Ivory Coast
- Coordinates: 9°35′N 8°8′W
- Country: Ivory Coast
- District: Denguélé
- Region: Kabadougou
- Department: Gbéléban

Population (2014)
  - Total: 2,569
- Time zone: UTC+0 (GMT)

Gbéléban is a town in north-western Ivory Coast. It is a sub-prefecture of and seat of Gbéléban Department in Kabadougou Region, Denguélé District. The town is a few hundred metres east of the border with Guinea; there is a border crossing two-and-a-half kilometres north of town.

With a population of just over 2,500, Gbéléban is the least-populated sub-prefecture in Ivory Coast.

Gbéléban was a commune until March 2012, when it became one of 1,126 communes nationwide that were abolished.

In 2014, the population of the sub-prefecture of Gbéléban was 2,569.

== Villages ==
The two villages of the sub-prefecture of Gbéléban and their population in 2014 are:

1. Gbahanla (252)
2. Gbéléban (2,317)
