= Kimbirila-Nord =

- Town and sub-prefecture
- Location in Ivory Coast
- Coordinates: 10°21′N 7°31′W
- Country: Ivory Coast
- District: Denguélé
- Region: Folon
- Department: Minignan

Population (2014)
  - Total: 4,932
- Time zone: UTC+0 (GMT)

Kimbirila-Nord is a town in north-western Ivory Coast. It is a sub-prefecture of Minignan Department in Folon Region, Denguélé District.

Kimbirila-Nord was a commune until March 2012, when it became one of 1,126 communes nationwide that were abolished.

In 2014, the population of the sub-prefecture of Kimbirila-Nord was 4,932.

== Villages ==
The six villages of the sub-prefecture of Kimbirila-Nord and their population in 2014 are:

1. Kimbirila-Nord (1,432)
2. Konéla (673)
3. Lélé (737)
4. Naguina (753)
5. Sanzanou (514)
6. Tiéfenzo (823)
