= N'Goloblasso =

N'Goloblasso Ngoloblaso
- Town and sub-prefecture
- Location in Ivory Coast
- Coordinates: 9°41′N 7°14′W
- Country: Ivory Coast
- District: Denguélé
- Region: Kabadougou
- Department: Madinani

Population (2014)
  - Total: 8,721
- Time zone: UTC+0 (GMT)

N'Goloblasso (also spelled Ngoloblaso) is a town in north-western Ivory Coast. It is a sub-prefecture of Madinani Department in Kabadougou Region, Denguélé District.

N'Goloblasso was a commune until March 2012, when it became one of 1,126 communes nationwide that were abolished.

In 2014, the population of the sub-prefecture of N'Goloblasso was 8,721.

== Villages ==
The six villages of the sub-prefecture of N'Goloblasso and their population in 2014 are:

1. Koroumba (2,024)
2. Bouroumasso (802)
3. Karasso (1,206)
4. N'goloblasso (2,330)
5. Séguébé (550)
6. Zéguétiéla (1,809)
