= Sokoro =

- Town and sub-prefecture
- Location in Ivory Coast
- Coordinates: 10°12′N 7°50′W
- Country: Ivory Coast
- District: Denguélé
- Region: Folon
- Department: Minignan

Population (2014)
  - Total: 6,704
- Time zone: UTC+0 (GMT)

Sokoro is a town near the northwestern extremity of Ivory Coast. It is a sub-prefecture of Minignan Department in Folon Region, Denguélé District. The town is situated near the border with Mali, south of the neighboring Yanfolila Cercle. One kilometre northwest of town is a border crossing.

Sokoro was a commune until March 2012, when it became one of 1,126 communes nationwide that were abolished.

In 2014, the population of the sub-prefecture of Sokoro was 6,704.

== Villages ==
The six villages of the sub-prefecture of Sokoro and their population in 2014 are:

1. Djirila Bada (450)
2. Keningouara (237)
3. Madina (1,915)
4. Nabagala (1,277)
5. Sokoro (2,266)
6. Tiemba (559)
