= Kinbirila =

Kimbirila or Kinbirila is the name of two villages in the department of Denguélé, Côte d'Ivoire:

- Kimbirila-Nord, a subprefecture (sous-préfecture) of the department of Minignan
- Kimbirila-Sud, a subprefecture (sous-préfecture) of the department of Odienné
