= Dioulatièdougou =

- Town, sub-prefecture, and commune
- Location in Ivory Coast
- Coordinates: 8°58′N 7°14′W
- Country: Ivory Coast
- District: Denguélé
- Region: Kabadougou
- Department: Odienné

Population (2014)
  - Total: 8,028
- Time zone: UTC+0 (GMT)

Dioulatièdougou is a town in north-western Ivory Coast. It is a sub-prefecture and commune of Odienné Department in Kabadougou Region, Denguélé District. The border of Woroba District is nearby to the southeast.

In 2014, the population of the sub-prefecture of Dioulatièdougou was 8,028.

== Villages ==
The 15 villages of the sub-prefecture of Dioulatièdougou and their population in 2014 are:

1. Dagaba (78)
2. Dioulatiedougou (1 410)
3. Doumba (288)
4. Tiékorodougou (581)
5. Bogoba (505)
6. Farako (810)
7. Kobala (128)
8. Kougbeni (265)
9. Massadougou (518)
10. Nafanasienso (954)
11. Nienesso (443)
12. Sanankoroba (269)
13. Tindikoro (843)
14. Tindikorosokoula (400)
15. Zandougou (536)
