= Denguélé =

Denguélé may refer to:

- Denguélé District, a district of Ivory Coast
- Denguélé Region, a former region of Ivory Coast
- AS Denguélé, a football team in Ivory Coast
