= Samango =

- Town and sub-prefecture
- Location in Ivory Coast
- Coordinates: 9°40′N 7°44′W
- Country: Ivory Coast
- District: Denguélé
- Region: Kabadougou
- Department: Gbéléban

Population (2014)
  - Total: 11,215
- Time zone: UTC+0 (GMT)

Samango is a town in northwestern Ivory Coast. It is a sub-prefecture of Gbéléban Department in Kabadougou Region, Denguélé District.

Samango was a commune until March 2012, when it became one of 1,126 communes nationwide that were abolished.

In 2014, the population of the sub-prefecture of Samango was 11,215.

== Villages ==
The 18 villages of the sub-prefecture of Samango and their population in 2014 are:

1. Blamadougou (658)
2. Bogodougou (584)
3. Dabadougou-Mafélé (983)
4. Farala (534)
5. Gbéréla (505)
6. Gouarini (697)
7. Iradougou (720)
8. Kogona (650)
9. Lossogo (665)
10. Mahandouni (409)
11. M'bégbélé (333)
12. Niamana (1,177)
13. Salonkourani (357)
14. Samango (674)
15. Sellé (471)
16. Siensoni (347)
17. Somokro (330)
18. Tougousso (1,121)
