= Niamana =

Niamana may refer to:

- Niamana, Ivory Coast
- Niamana, Koulikoro, Mali
- Niamana, Ségou, Mali
