= Odienné Department =

Coordinates: 9°30′N 7°34′W

Odienné Department Département d'Odienné
- Department
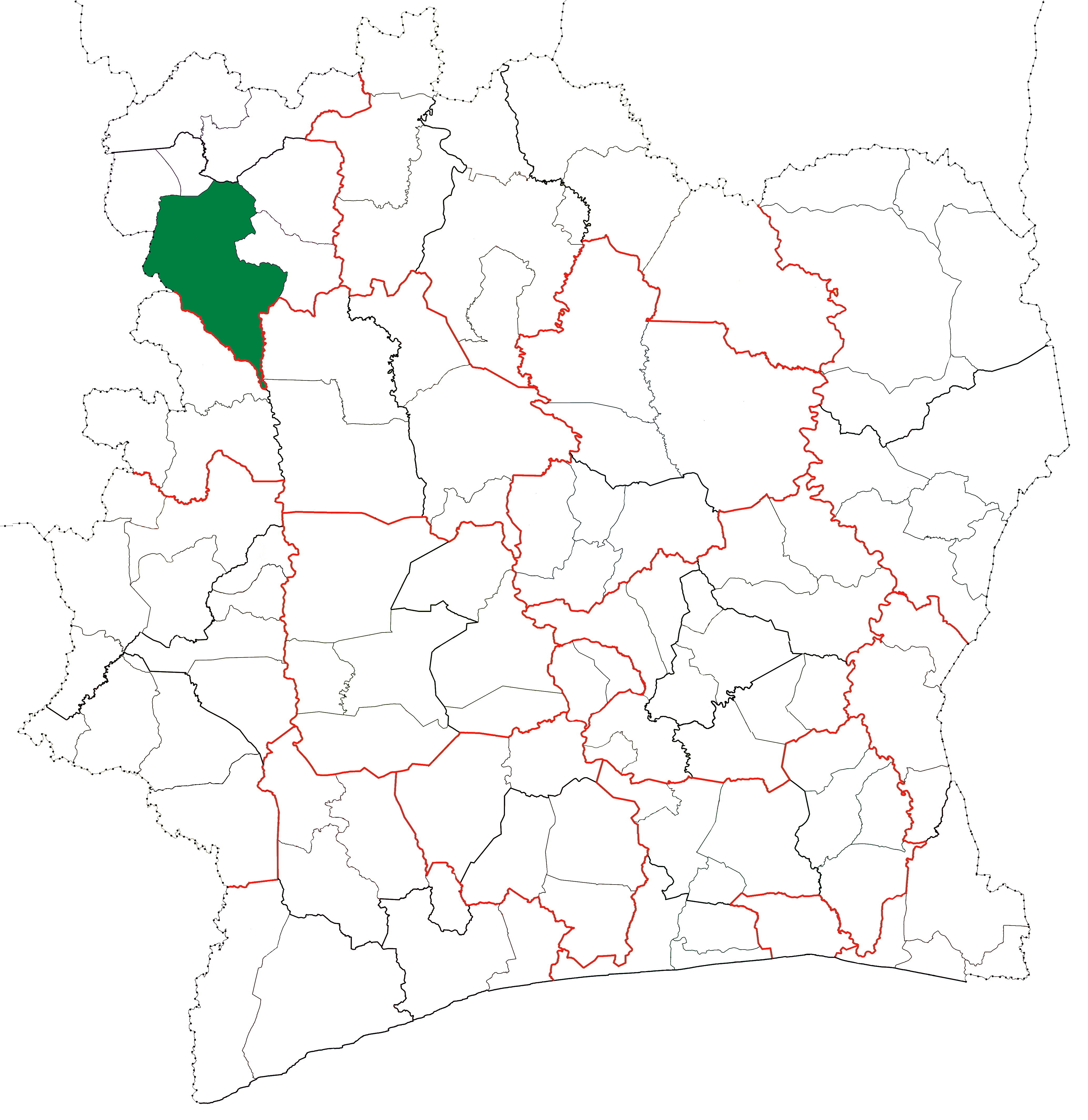
- Location in Ivory Coast. Odienné Department has had these boundaries since 2012.
- Country: Ivory Coast
- District: Denguélé
- Region: Kabadougou
- 1969: Established as a first-level subdivision
- 1997: Converted to a second-level subdivision
- 2005: Divided to create Madinani and Minignan Depts
- 2009: Divided to create Samatiguila Dept
- 2011: Converted to a third-level subdivision
- 2012: Divided to create Gbéléban and Séguélon Depts
- Departmental seat: Odienné

Government
  - Prefect: Yao Michel Amani

Area
  - Total: 3,381 km^{2} (1,305 sq mi)

Population (2021 census)
  - Total: 156,730
  - Density: 46.36/km^{2} (120.1/sq mi)
- Time zone: UTC+0 (GMT)

Odienné Department is a department of Kabadougou Region in Denguélé District, Ivory Coast. In 2021, its population was 156,730 and its seat is the settlement of Odienné. The sub-prefectures of the department are Bako, Bougousso, Dioulatièdougou, Odienné, and Tiémé.

== History ==
Odienné Department was created in 1969 as one of the 24 new departments that were created to take the place of the six departments that were being abolished. It was created from territory that was formerly part of Nord Department. Using current boundaries as a reference, from 1969 to 2005 the department occupied the territory of Denguélé District.

In 1997, regions were introduced as new first-level subdivisions of Ivory Coast; as a result, all departments were converted into second-level subdivisions. The territory of Odienné Department was co-extensive with that of Denguélé Region from 1997 to 2005.

In 2005, Odienné Department was divided into three in order to create Madinani Department and Minignan Department. Odienné Department was divided again in 2009 to create Samatiguila Department.

In 2011, districts were introduced as new first-level subdivisions of Ivory Coast. At the same time, regions were reorganised and became second-level subdivisions and all departments were converted into third-level subdivisions. At this time, Odienné Department became part of Kabadougou Region in Denguélé District.

In 2012, a fourth and fifth division of Odienné Department occurred when five sub-prefectures were split from it to create Gbéléban Department and Séguélon Department. Since Minignan Department had also been split to create Kaniasso Department, the original territory of Odienné Department is now the seven departments in the Folon Region and Kabadougou regions of Denguélé.

=== Maps of historical boundaries ===
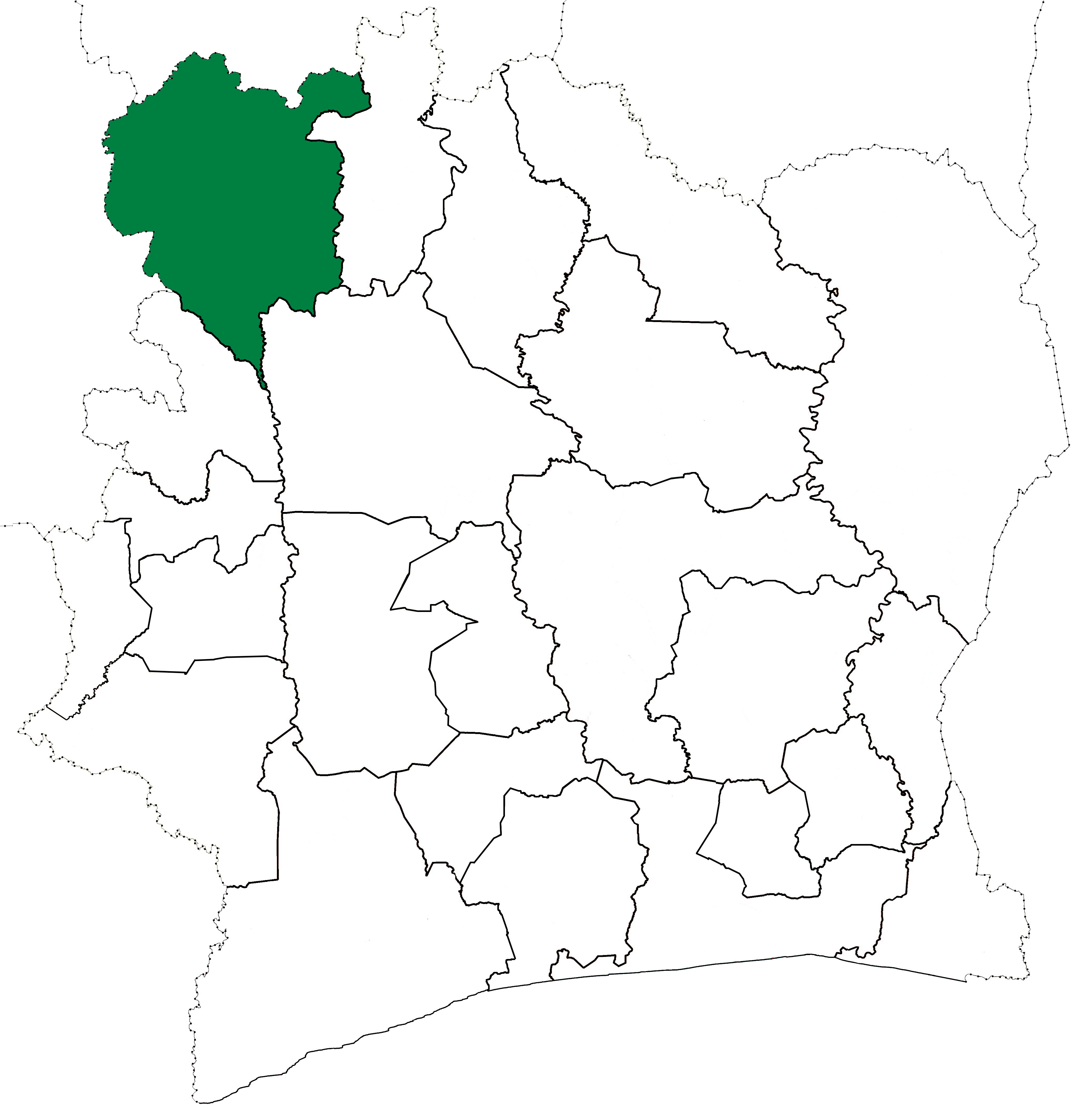
Odienné Department upon its creation in 1969. It kept these boundaries until 2005, but other departments began to be divided in 1974.

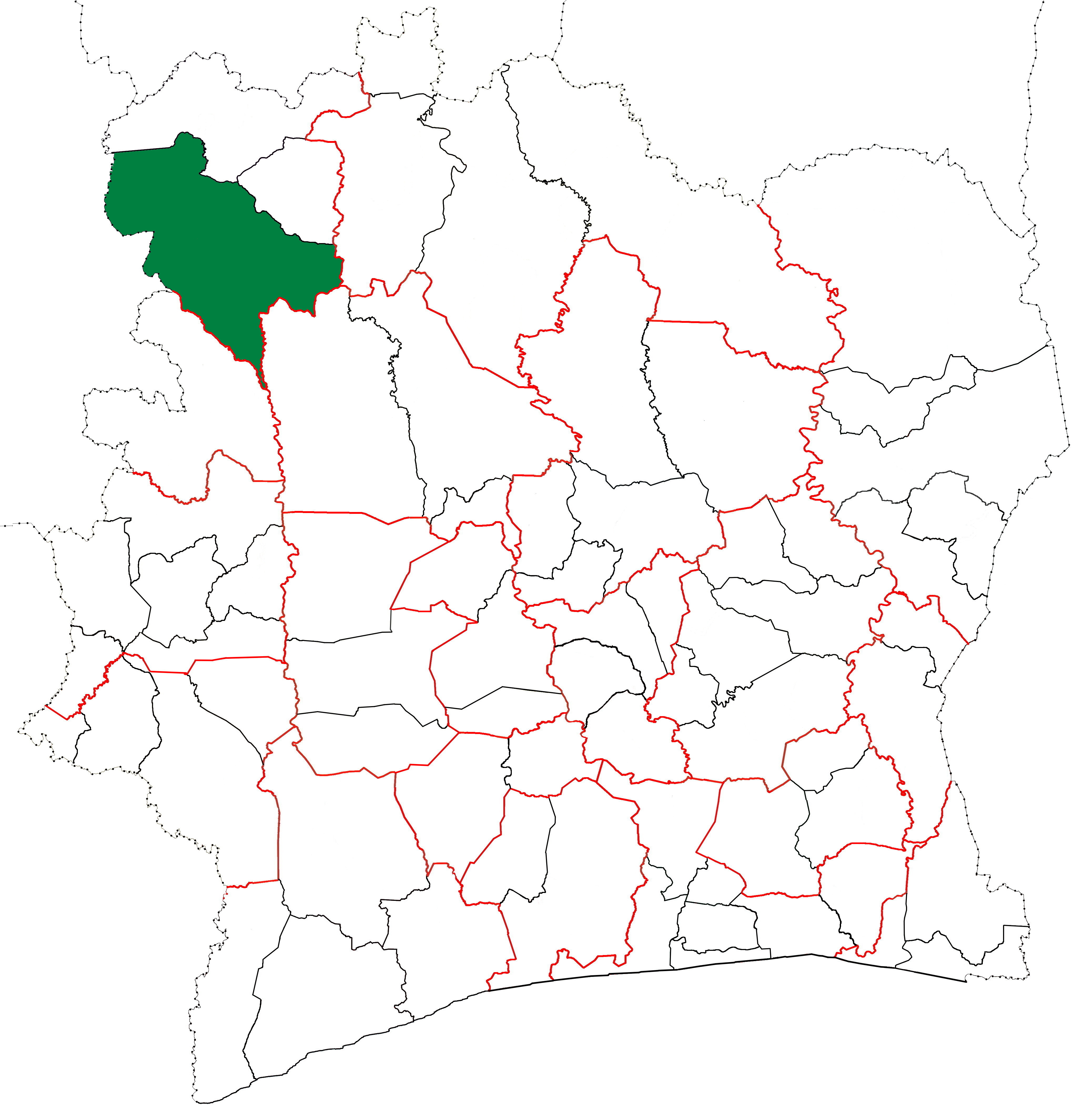
Odienné Department from 2005 to 2009. (Other subdivisions began to be divided in 2008).

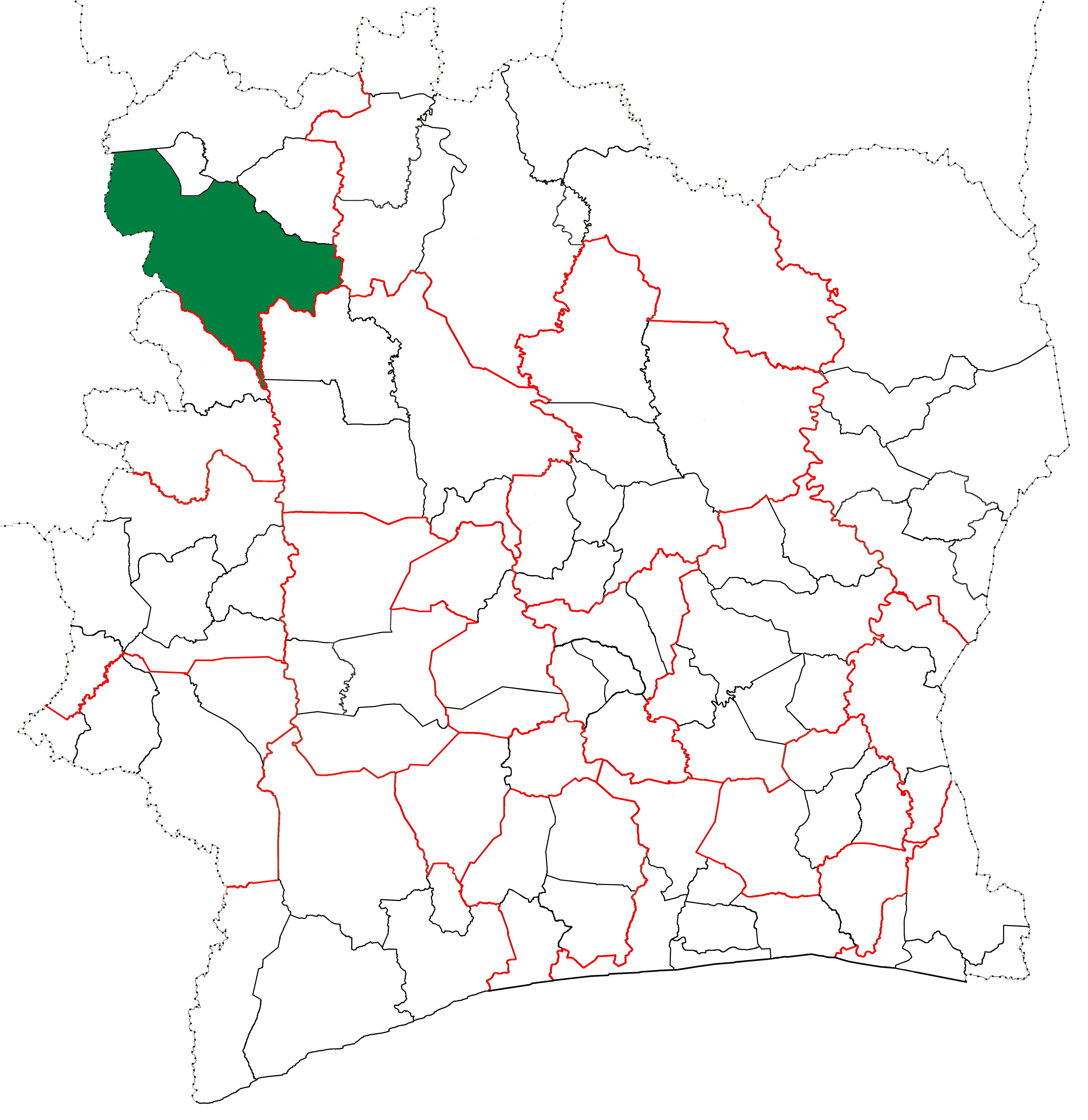
Odienné Department from 2009 to 2012. (Other subdivisions were reorganised and divided in 2011.)
