= Nafana (disambiguation) =

The Nafana people are an ethnic group in Ghana and Ivory Coast.

Nafana may also refer to:

- Nafana, Lacs, a town in Lacs District, Ivory Coast
- Nafana, Savanes, a town in Savanes District, Ivory Coast
- Nafana-Sienso, a village in Denguélé District, Ivory Coast
