= Bako, Ivory Coast =

Bako
- Town, sub-prefecture, and commune
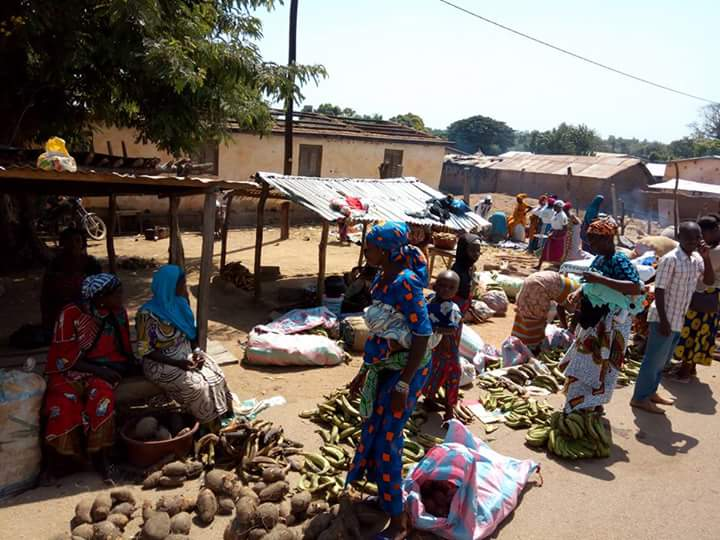
- Market day in Bako

- Location in Ivory Coast
- Coordinates: 9°8′N 7°37′W
- Country: Ivory Coast
- District: Denguélé
- Region: Kabadougou
- Department: Odienné

Population (2014)
  - Total: 17,253
- Time zone: UTC+0 (GMT)

Bako is a town in north-western Ivory Coast. It is a sub-prefecture and commune of Odienné Department in Kabadougou Region, Denguélé District.

In the Dioula language of Ivory Coast and the Bambara language of Mali, "Bako" means "behind the river": "Ba" means "river" and "ko" means "behind". The people of the town are mostly agrarian.

In 2014, the population of the sub-prefecture of Bako was 17,253.

== Villages ==
The 26 villages of the sub-prefecture of Bako and their population in 2014 are:

1. Bako (1 796)
2. Bohisso (806)
3. Gondiedougou (130)
4. Linguesso (876)
5. Mindiadougou (86)
6. Moya 1 (546)
7. Sarakorodougou (427)
8. Tchigbéla (1 282)
9. Tomba (584)
10. Badjouala (179)
11. Férémandougou (1 254)
12. Kahanlo (445)
13. Kahanso (1 427)
14. Kona (494)
15. Korondougou (738)
16. Mamouroudougou (493)
17. Mamoya (521)
18. M'basso (347)
19. Moya 2 (469)
20. Mohi-Moussadougou (785)
21. Niénesso (765)
22. Sokorodougou (1 181)
23. Tindrima Sokoro (473)
24. Tindrima Sokoura (175)
25. Yagbèdougou (438)
26. Zandougou (536)
