= Samatiguila Department =

Coordinates: 9°49′N 7°34′W

Samatiguila Department Département de Samatiguila
- Department
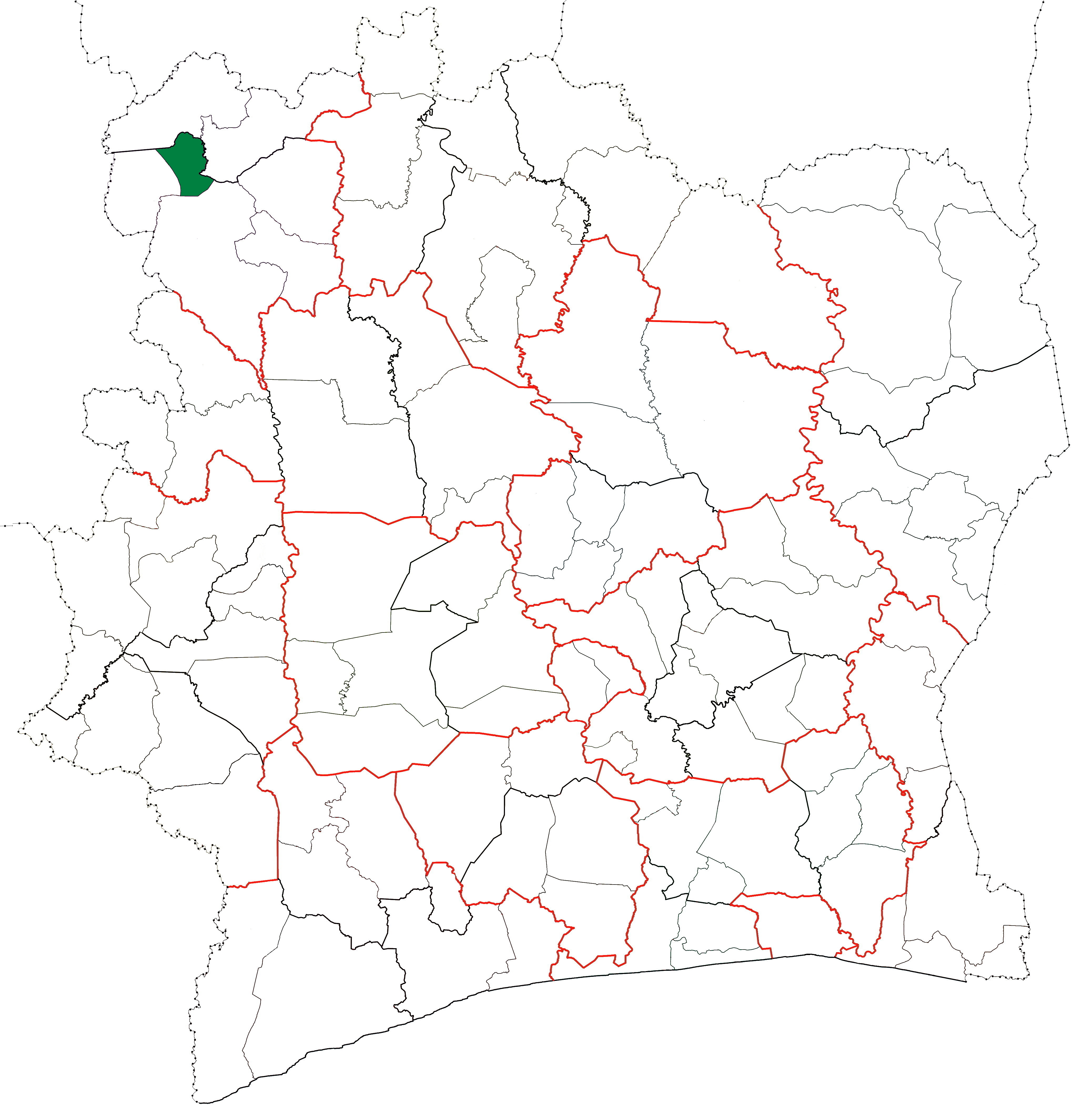
- Location in Ivory Coast. Samatiguila Department has retained the same boundaries since its creation in 2009.
- Country: Ivory Coast
- District: Denguélé
- Region: Kabadougou
- 2009: Established as a second-level subdivision via a division of Odienné Dept
- 2011: Converted to a third-level subdivision
- Departmental seat: Samatiguila

Government
  - Prefect: Patrice Gueu

Area
  - Total: 824 km^{2} (318 sq mi)

Population (2021 census)
  - Total: 19,710
  - Density: 23.9/km^{2} (62.0/sq mi)
- Time zone: UTC+0 (GMT)

Samatiguila Department is a department of Kabadougou Region in Denguélé District, Ivory Coast. In 2021, its population was 19,710, making it the least-populous department in the country. The departmental seat is the settlement of Samatiguila. The sub-prefectures of the department are Kimbirila-Sud and Samatiguila.

== History ==
Samatiguila Department was created in 2009 as a second-level subdivision via a split-off from Odienné Department. At its creation, it was part of Denguélé Region.

In 2011, districts were introduced as new first-level subdivisions of Ivory Coast. At the same time, regions were reorganised and became second-level subdivisions and all departments were converted into third-level subdivisions. At this time, Samatiguila Department became part of Kabadougou Region in Denguélé District.
