= Séguélon Department =

Coordinates: 9°21′N 7°7′W

Séguélon Department Département de Séguélon
- Department
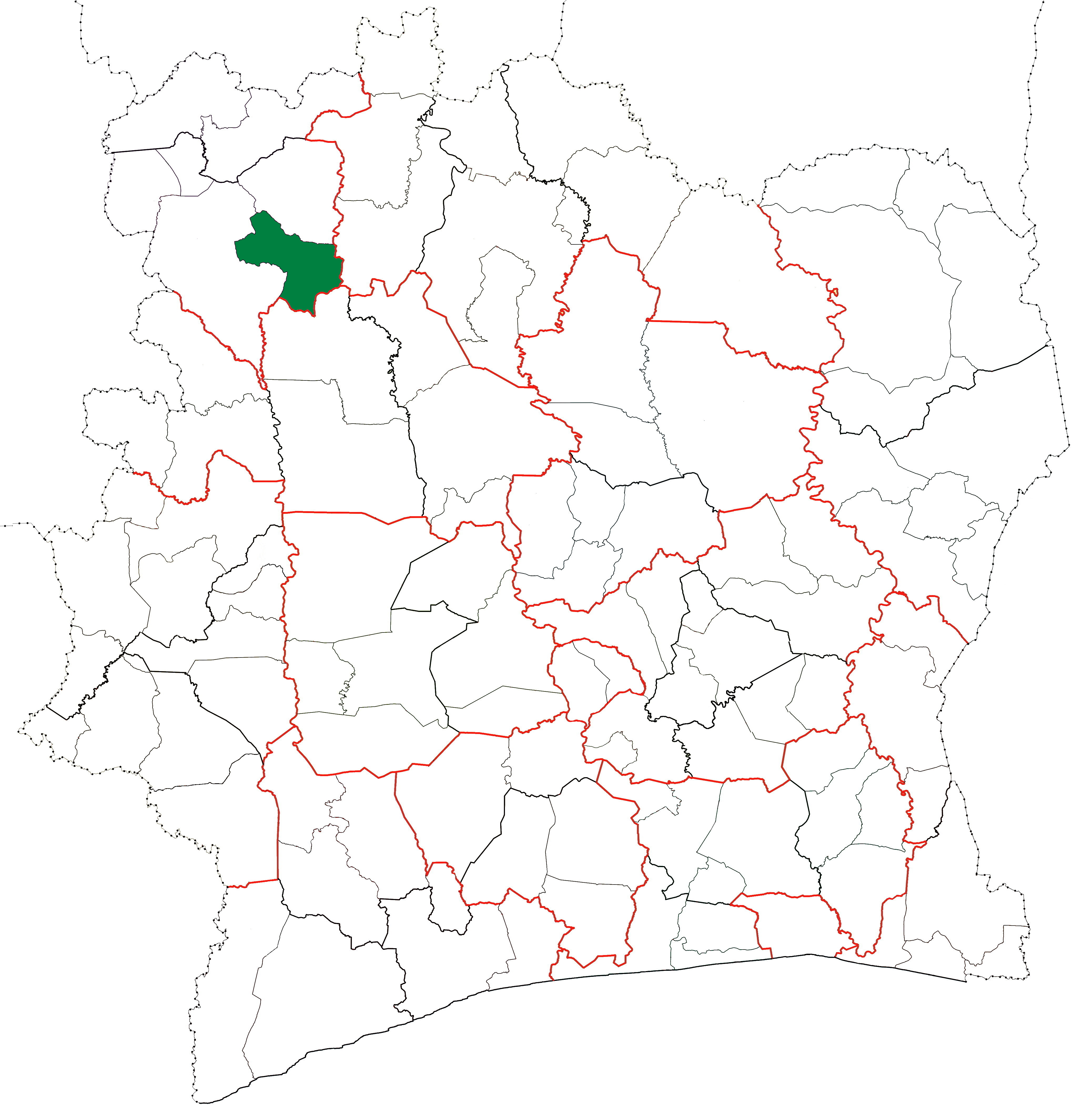
- Location in Ivory Coast. Séguélon Department has retained the same boundaries since its creation in 2012.
- Country: Ivory Coast
- District: Denguélé
- Region: Kabadougou
- 2012: Established via a division of Madinani Dept
- Departmental seat: Séguélon

Government
  - Prefect: Benjamin Nanou

Area
  - Total: 2,180 km^{2} (840 sq mi)

Population (2021 census)
  - Total: 33,585
  - Density: 15.4/km^{2} (39.9/sq mi)
- Time zone: UTC+0 (GMT)

Séguélon Department is a department of Kabadougou Region in Denguélé District, Ivory Coast. In 2021, its population was 33,585 and its seat is the settlement of Séguélon. The sub-prefectures of the department are Gbongaha and Séguélon.

== History ==
Séguélon Department was created in 2012 by dividing Madinani Department.
