= Kimbirila-Sud =

- Town and sub-prefecture
- Location in Ivory Coast
- Coordinates: 9°43′N 7°47′W
- Country: Ivory Coast
- District: Denguélé
- Region: Kabadougou
- Department: Samatiguila

Population (2014)
  - Total: 8,550
- Time zone: UTC+0 (GMT)

Kimbirila-Sud is a town in north-western Ivory Coast. It is a sub-prefecture of Samatiguila Department in Kabadougou Region, Denguélé District.

Kimbirila-Sud was a commune until March 2012, when it became one of 1,126 communes nationwide that were abolished.
