= List of districts of Ivory Coast by Human Development Index =

This is a list of the districts of the Ivory Coast and the two autonomous cities of Yamoussoukro and Abidjan as cited in the Human Development Index as of 2023. 4 districts of the Ivory Coast weren't included in the list, so they have been left blank on the table.

Rank	District	HDI (2023)
Medium human development
1	Yamoussoukro	0.630
2	Montagnes	0.617
3	Abidjan	0.611
4	Bas-Sassandra	0.603
–	Ivory Coast (average)	0.582
5	Sassandra-Marahoué	0.567
6	Comoé	0.559
Low human development
7	Lagunes	0.540
8	Gôh-Djiboua	0.534
9	Denguélé	0.515
10	Lacs	0.470
Not included in the list
–	Savanes	–
–	Vallée du Bandama	–
–	Woroba	–
–	Zanzan	–

== See also ==
- List of countries by Human Development Index
