= Minignan =

Minignan Maninian
- Town, sub-prefecture, and commune
- Location in Ivory Coast
- Coordinates: 10°0′N 7°50′W
- Country: Ivory Coast
- District: Denguélé
- Region: Folon
- Department: Minignan

Population (2014)
  - Total: 14,521
- Time zone: UTC+0 (GMT)

Minignan (also spelled Maninian) is a town in north-western Ivory Coast. It is a sub-prefecture of and the seat of Minignan Department. It is also a commune and the seat of the Folon Region in Denguélé District.

== History ==
The French explorer René Caillié stopped at Minignan in 1827 on his journey from Boké, in present-day Guinea, to Timbuktu in Mali. He was travelling in a caravan transporting kola nuts to Djenné. He described the village in his book Travels through Central Africa to Timbuctoo.

We halted towards two o'clock at Manegnan [Minignan], a village inhabited by Bambaras; it contains about eight or nine hundred inhabitants; the natives call this part of the country Foulou, and like the Wassoulos they speak the Mandingo language; I did not perceive that they had any particular dialect. They are idolaters, or rather, they are without any religion; their food and clothes are like those of the inhabitants of Wassoulo; and they are equally dirty.

In 2014, the population of the sub-prefecture of Minignan was 14,521.

== Villages ==
The 13 villages of the sub-prefecture of Minignan and their population in 2014 are:

1. Diandéguéla (1 007)
2. Minignan (6 831)
3. Bougoussa (678)
4. Djérila (778)
5. Djonrozo Somotou (498)
6. Fanhanla (563)
7. Gouenzou (901)
8. Koriani (431)
9. Linguékoro (209)
10. Niamina (658)
11. Sambadougou (397)
12. Sokouraba (867)
13. Tienny (703)
