= Minignan Department =

Coordinates: 10°0′N 7°50′W

Minignan Department Département de Minignan
- Department
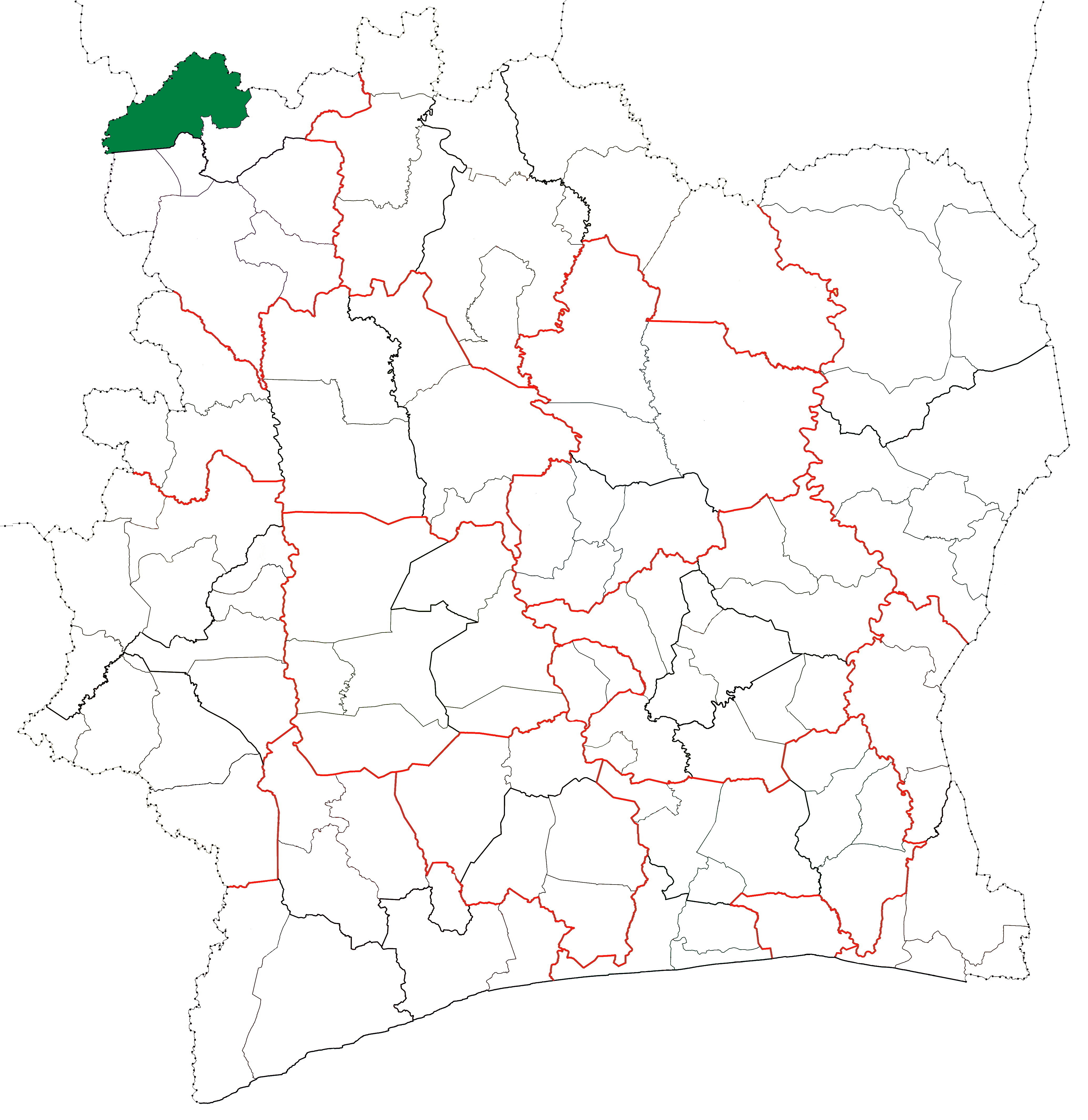
- Location in Ivory Coast. Minignan Department has had these boundaries since 2011.
- Country: Ivory Coast
- District: Denguélé
- Region: Folon
- 2005: Established as a second-level subdivision via a division of Odienné Dept
- 2011: Converted to a third-level subdivision
- 2011: Divided to create Kaniasso Dept
- Departmental seat: Minignan

Government
  - Prefect: Abdou Karim Barro Baladji

Area
  - Total: 3,180 km^{2} (1,230 sq mi)

Population (2021 census)
  - Total: 61,637
  - Density: 19.4/km^{2} (50.2/sq mi)
- Time zone: UTC+0 (GMT)

Minignan Department is a department of Folon Region in Denguélé District, Ivory Coast. In 2021, its population was 61,637 and its seat is the settlement of Minignan. The sub-prefectures of the department are Kimbirila-Nord, Minignan, Sokoro, and Tienko.

== History ==
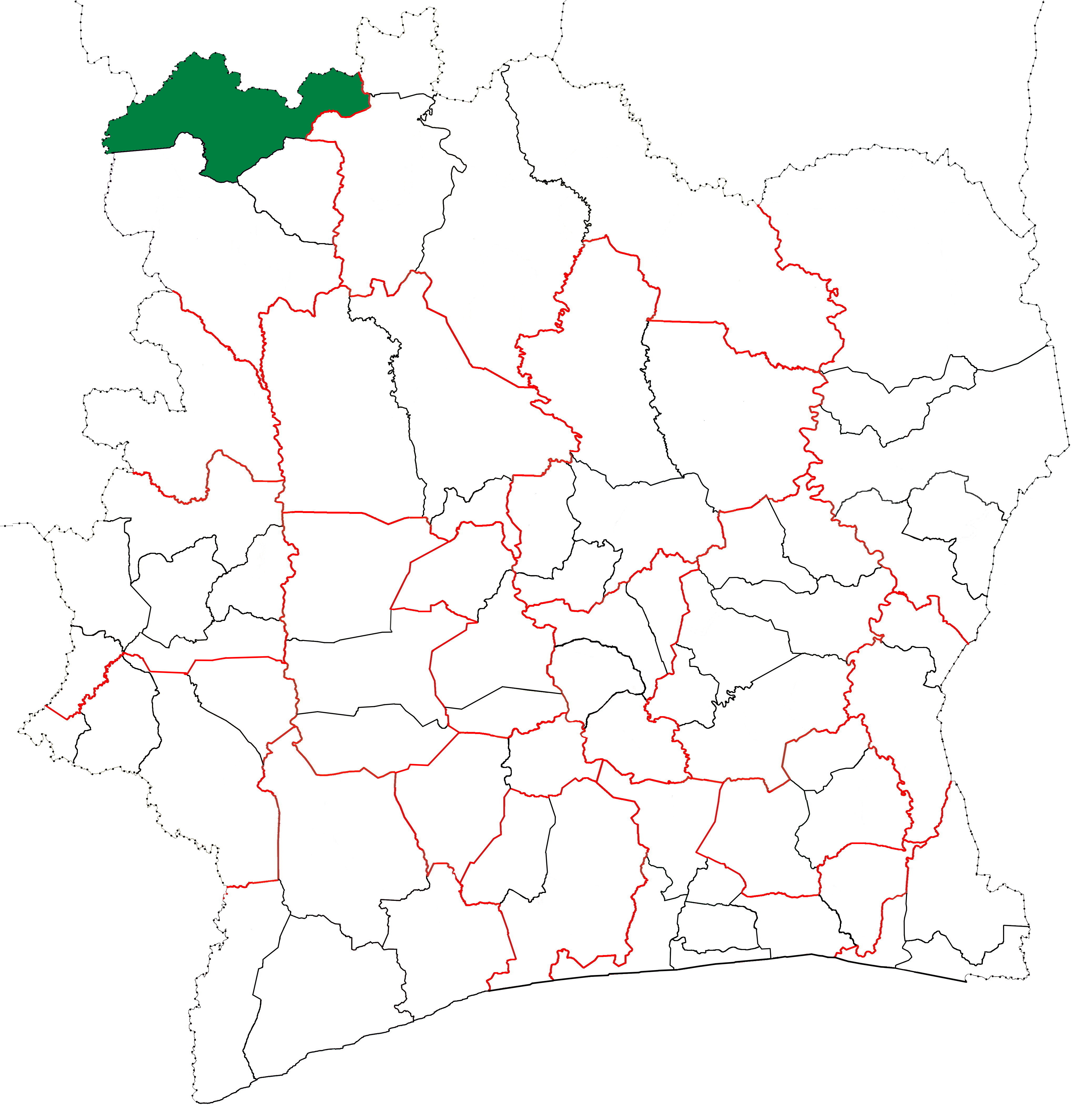
Minignan Department upon its creation in 2005. It kept these boundaries until 2011, but other subdivision boundary changes began to be made in 2008.

Minignan Department was created in 2005 as a second-level subdivision via a split-off from Odienné Department. At its creation, it was part of Denguélé Region.

In 2011, districts were introduced as new first-level subdivisions of Ivory Coast. At the same time, regions were reorganised and became second-level subdivisions and all departments were converted into third-level subdivisions. At this time, Minignan Department became part of Folon Region in Denguélé District. At the same time, the department was split to create Kaniasso Department.
