= Kaniasso Department =

Coordinates: 9°49′N 7°31′W

Kaniasso Department Département de Kaniasso
- Department
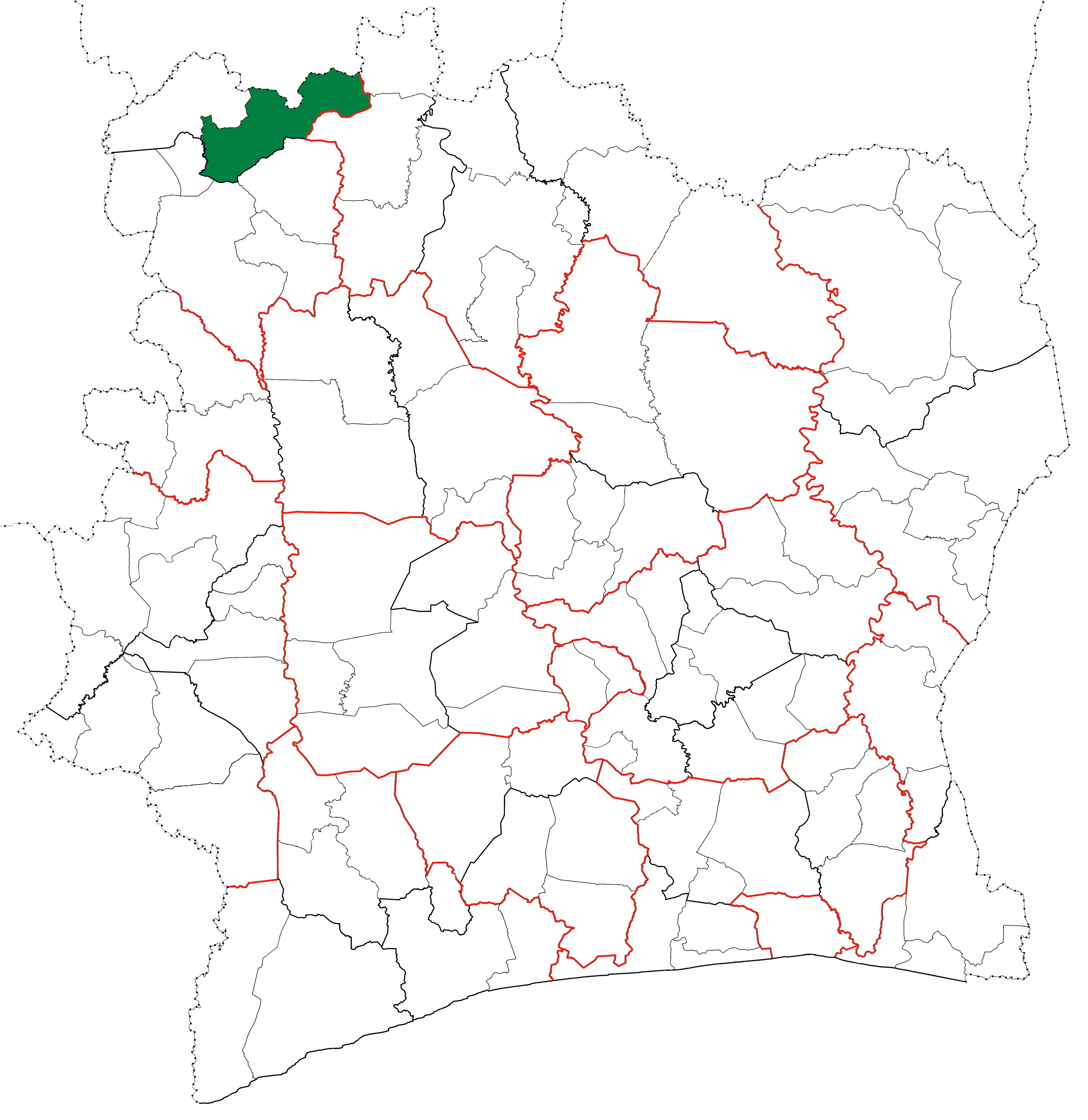
- Location in Ivory Coast. Kaniasso Department has retained the same boundaries since its creation in 2011.
- Country: Ivory Coast
- District: Denguélé
- Region: Folon
- 2011: Established via a division of Minignan Dept
- Departmental seat: Kaniasso

Government
  - Prefect: Thomas Lasme

Area
  - Total: 3,430 km^{2} (1,320 sq mi)

Population (2021 census)
  - Total: 84,572
  - Density: 24.7/km^{2} (63.9/sq mi)
- Time zone: UTC+0 (GMT)

Kaniasso Department is a department of Folon Region in Denguélé District, Ivory Coast. In 2021, its population was 84,572 and its seat is the settlement of Kaniasso. The sub-prefectures of the department are Goulia, Kaniasso and Mahandiana-Sokourani.

== History ==
Kaniasso Department was created in 2011 as part of the restructuring of the subdivisions of Ivory Coast, when departments were converted from the second-level administrative subdivisions of the country to the third-level subdivisions. It was created by splitting Minignan Department.
