= Gbéléban Department =

Coordinates: 9°35′N 8°8′W

Gbéléban Department Département de Gbéléban
- Department
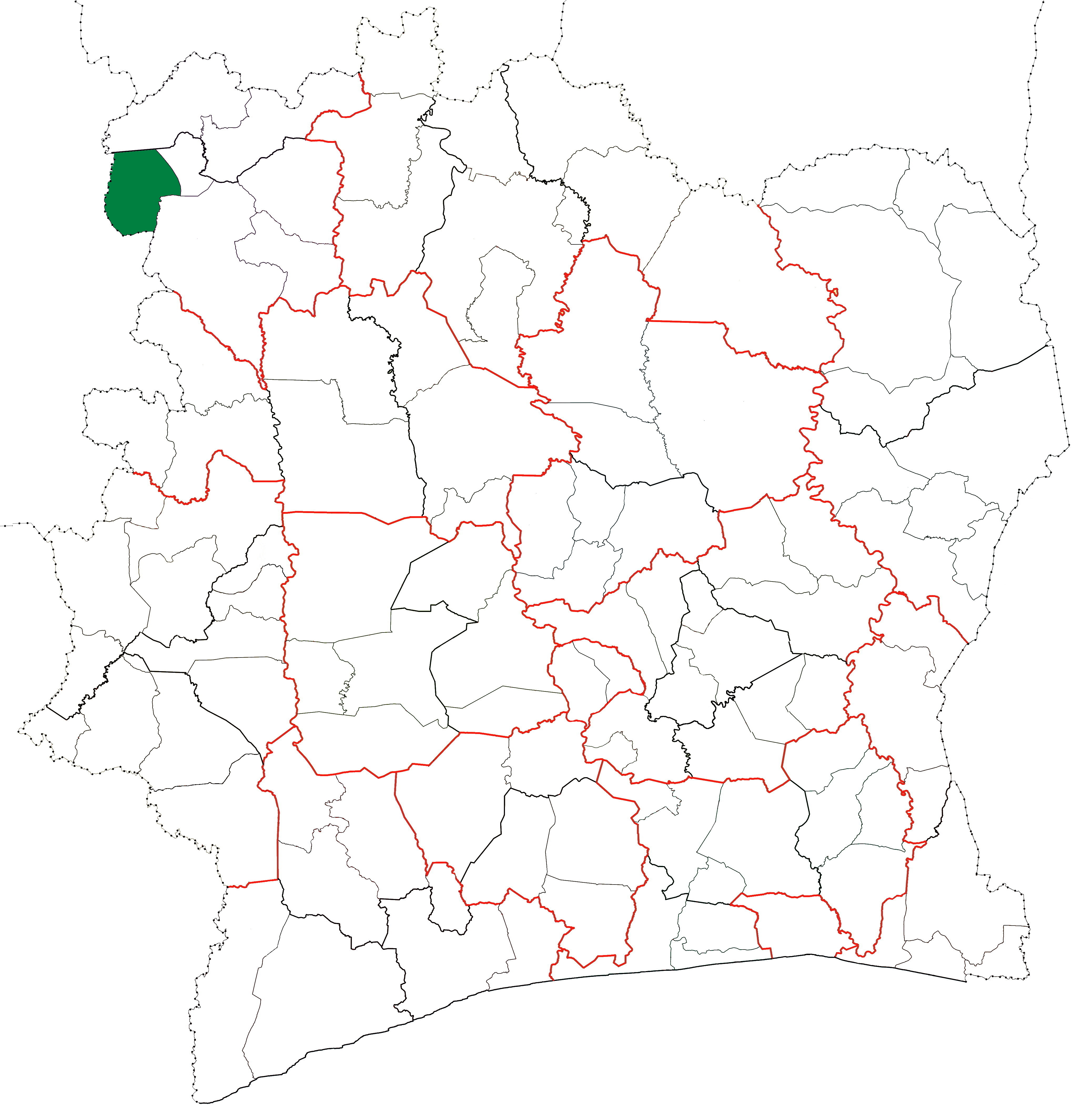
- Location in Ivory Coast. Gbéléban Department has retained the same boundaries since its creation in 2012.
- Country: Ivory Coast
- District: Denguélé
- Region: Kabadougou
- 2012: Established via a division of Odienné Dept
- Departmental seat: Gbéléban

Government
  - Prefect: Yao Brou

Area
  - Total: 1,920 km^{2} (740 sq mi)

Population (2021 census)
  - Total: 29,532
  - Density: 15.4/km^{2} (39.8/sq mi)
- Time zone: UTC+0 (GMT)

Gbéléban Department is a department of Kabadougou Region in Denguélé District, Ivory Coast. In 2021, its population was 29,532 and its seat is the settlement of Gbéléban. The sub-prefectures of the department are Gbéléban, Samango and Seydougou.

== History ==
Gbéléban Department was created in 2012 by dividing Odienné Department.
