= Madinani =

- Town, sub-prefecture, and commune
- Location in Ivory Coast
- Coordinates: 9°37′N 6°57′W
- Country: Ivory Coast
- District: Denguélé
- Region: Kabadougou
- Department: Madinani

Population (2014)
  - Total: 25,054
- Time zone: UTC+0 (GMT)

Madinani is a town in north-western Ivory Coast. It is a sub-prefecture and the seat of Madinani Department in Kabadougou Region, Denguélé District. Madinani is also a commune. The town is centered between two major settlements in both the Denguélé and Savanes Districts: Odienné, located 40 kilometres (25 mi) west, and Boundiali, located 25 kilometres (16 mi) to the east.

In 2014, the population of the sub-prefecture of Madinani was 25,054.

== Villages ==
The 18 villages of the sub-prefecture of Madinani and their population in 2014 are:

1. Kadiasso (1 266)
2. Kafingué (1 111)
3. N'gapyé (1 267)
4. Sanaba (1 175)
5. Sokouraba (668)
6. Fembyasso (423)
7. Kébiko 1 (353)
8. Kébiko 2 (1 006)
9. Madinani (6 710)
10. Dabadougou (1 058)
11. Dienguélé (1 056)
12. Dognéindougou (237)
13. Fandasso (834)
14. Kokoun (2 674)
15. Lossingué (1 247)
16. Mahandiana-Koura (1 054)
17. Siansoba (1 508)
18. Tora (1 407)
