= Denguélé Region =

Coordinates: 9°30′N 7°25′W

Denguélé Region Région du Denguélé
- Defunct region of Ivory Coast
- 1997–2011
- Location of Denguélé Region in Ivory Coast
- Capital: Odienné
- Area
- 20,997 km^{2} (8,107 sq mi)
- History
  - Established as a first-level subdivision: 1997
  - Disestablished: 2011
- Today part of: Denguélé District

Denguélé Region (French: Région du Denguélé, pronounced [ʁeʒjɔ̃ dy dɛnɡele]) is a defunct region of Ivory Coast. From 1997 to 2011, it was a first-level subdivision region. The region's capital was Odienné and its area was 20,997 km². Since 2011, the territory formerly encompassed by the region is co-extensive with Denguélé District.

The region was located in the northwest extremity of the country, bordering Sikasso, Mali to the north, and Nzérékoré, Guinea, to the west. The region of Bafing lay to the south, Worodougou was situated to the south-east, and Savanes to the immediate east.

== Administrative divisions ==
At the time of its dissolution, Denguélé Region was divided into four departments: Madinani, Minignan, Odienné, and Samatiguila.

== Abolition ==
Denguélé Region was abolished as part of the 2011 administrative reorganisation of the subdivisions of Ivory Coast. The area formerly encompassed by the region is the same territory that is now Denguélé District.
