= Madinani Department =

Coordinates: 9°37′N 6°57′W

Madinani Department Département de Madinani
- Department
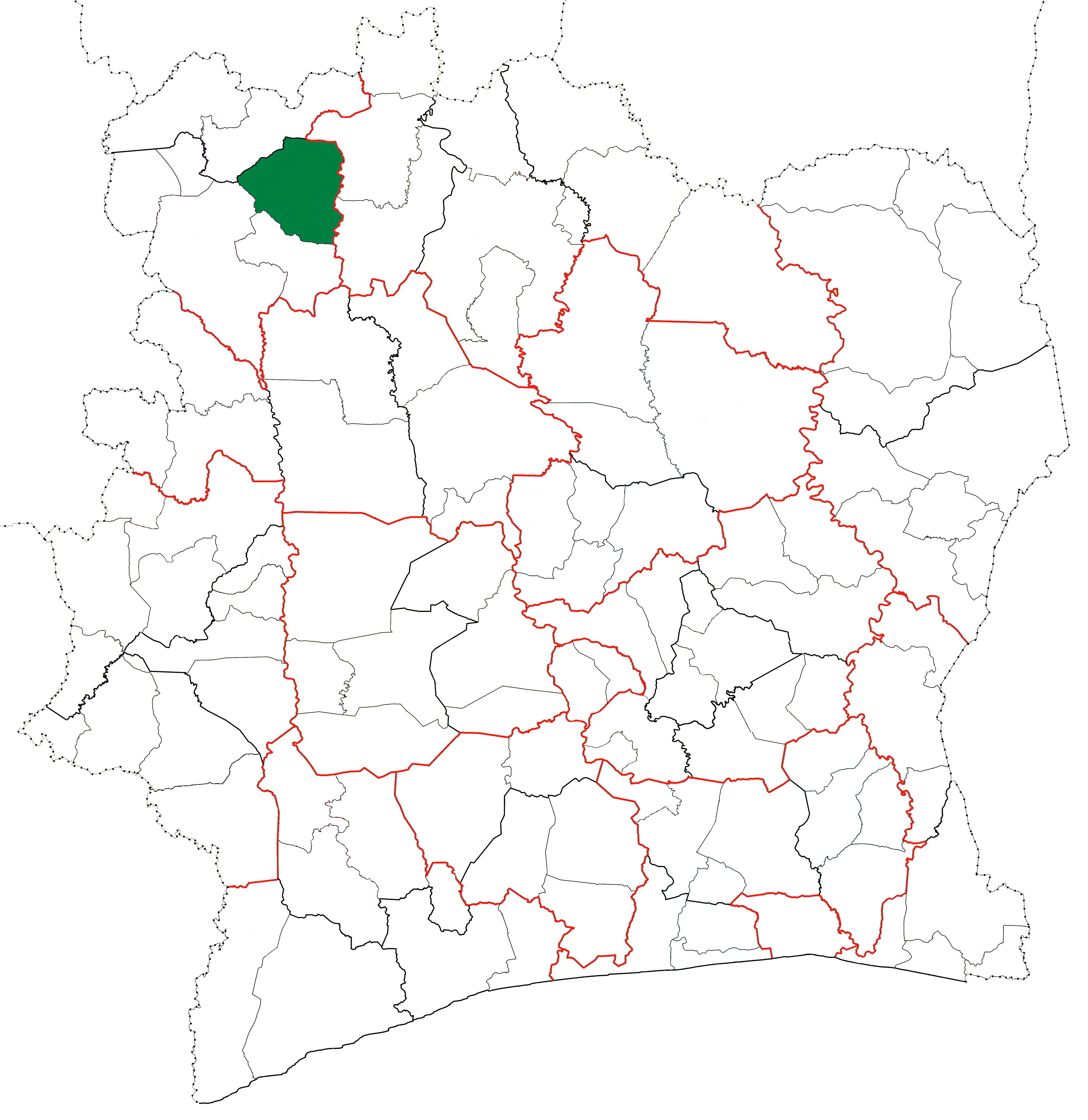
- Location in Ivory Coast. Madinani Department has retained the same boundaries since its creation in 2005.
- Country: Ivory Coast
- District: Denguélé
- Region: Kabadougou
- 2005: Established as a second-level subdivision via a division of Odienné Dept
- 2011: Converted to a third-level subdivision
- Departmental seat: Madinani

Government
  - Prefect: Ibrahima Bayo

Area
  - Total: 3,160 km^{2} (1,220 sq mi)

Population (2021 census)
  - Total: 50,248
  - Density: 15.9/km^{2} (41.2/sq mi)
- Time zone: UTC+0 (GMT)

Madinani Department is a department of Kabadougou Region in Denguélé District, Ivory Coast. In 2021, its population was 50,248 and its seat is the settlement of Madinani. The sub-prefectures of the department are Fengolo, Madinani, and N'Goloblasso.

== History ==
Madinani Department was created in 2005 as a second-level subdivision via a split-off from Odienné Department. At its creation, it was part of Denguélé Region.

In 2011, districts were introduced as new first-level subdivisions of Ivory Coast. At the same time, regions were reorganised and became second-level subdivisions and all departments were converted into third-level subdivisions. At this time, Madinani Department became part of Kabadougou Region in Denguélé District.
