= Folon Region =

Coordinates: 10°0′N 7°50′W

Folon Region Région du Folon
- Region
- Seal
- Motto: "Le développement participatif"
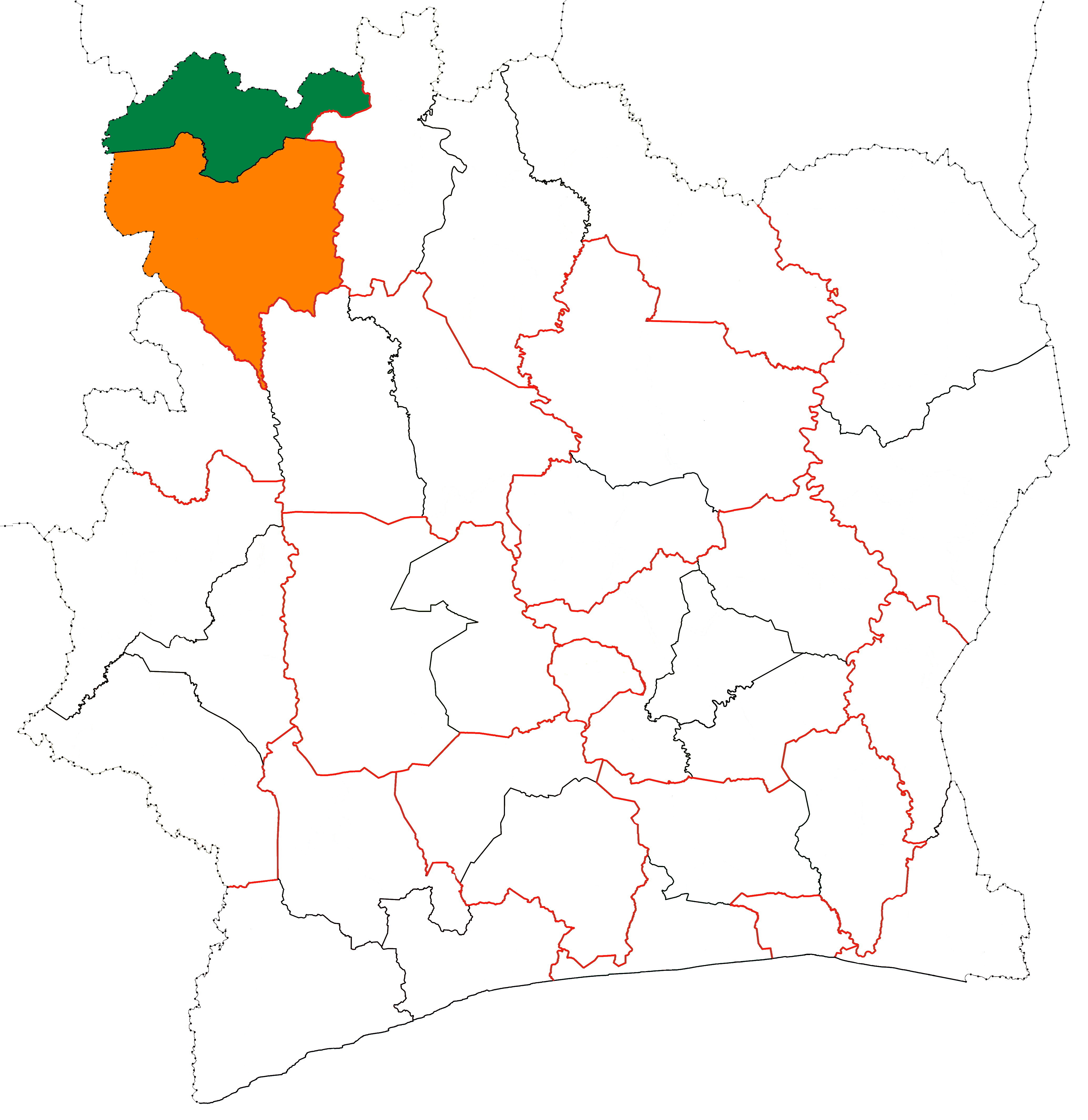
- Location of Folon Region (green) in Ivory Coast and in Denguélé District
- Country: Ivory Coast
- District: Denguélé
- Established: 2011
- Regional seat: Minignan

Government
  - Prefect: Abdou Karim Barro Baladji
  - Council President: Sindou Cissé

Area
  - Total: 7,239 km^{2} (2,795 sq mi)

Population (2021 census)
  - Total: 146,209
  - Density: 20.20/km^{2} (52.31/sq mi)
- Time zone: UTC+0 (GMT)

Folon Region is one of the 31 regions of Ivory Coast. Since its establishment in 2011, it has been one of two regions in Denguélé District. The seat of the region is Minignan and the region's population in the 2021 census was 146,209, making it the least-populous region of the country.

Folon is currently divided into two departments: Kaniasso and Minignan.

== Natural geography ==
The majority of the geography of Folon is savannah, but there are forests along the rivers. The forests are threatened by illegal logging and bushfires. The wild fauna of the region includes baboons, warthogs, boars, partridges, francolins, antelopes, waterbucks, bushbucks, rabbits, and boas.
