= Kabadougou =

Region of Ivory Coast

Coordinates: 9°30′N 7°34′W

Kabadougou Region Région du Kabadougou
- Region
- Seal
- Motto: "Tous ensemble pour le développement du Kabadougou"
- Location of Kabadougou Region (dark blue) in Ivory Coast
- Country: Ivory Coast
- District: Denguélé
- 2011: Established
- Regional seat: Odienné

Government
  - Prefect: Yao Michel Amani
  - Council President: Souleymane Koné

Area
  - Total: 14,190 km^{2} (5,480 sq mi)

Population (2021)
  - Total: 289,806
  - Density: 20.42/km^{2} (52.90/sq mi)
- Time zone: UTC+0 (GMT)
- Website: crkabadougou.org

Kabadougou Region is one of the 31 regions of Ivory Coast. Since its establishment in 2011, it has been one of two regions in Denguélé District. The seat of the region is Odienné and the region's population in the 2021 census was 289,806.

Kabadougou is currently divided into five departments: Gbéléban, Madinani, Odienné, Samatiguila, and Séguélon.
