= Denguélé District =

District of Ivory Coast

Coordinates: 9°30′N 7°34′W

Denguélé District District du Denguélé
- District
- Country: Ivory Coast
- Established: 2011
- Capital: Odienné

Government
  - Governor: Oumar Binaté

Area
  - Total: 20,900 km^{2} (8,100 sq mi)

Population (2021 census)
  - Total: 436,015
  - Density: 20.9/km^{2} (54.0/sq mi)
- HDI (2022): 0.440 low · 13th of 14

Denguélé District (French: district du Denguélé, [distʁikt dy dɛnɡele]) is one of fourteen administrative districts of Ivory Coast. The district is located in the northwest corner of the country. The capital of the district is Odienné.

== Creation ==
Denguélé District was created in a 2011 administrative reorganisation of the subdivisions of Ivory Coast. The territory of the district was composed of the former Denguélé Region.

== Administrative divisions ==
Denguélé District is currently subdivided into two regions and the following departments:

- Folon Region (region seat in Minignan)
  - Kaniasso Department
  - Minignan Department
- Kabadougou Region (region seat also in Odienné)
  - Gbéléban Department
  - Madinani Department
  - Odienné Department
  - Samatiguila Department
  - Séguélon Department

== Population ==
According to the 2021 census, Denguélé District has a population of 436,015, making it the second least populated district of the country behind Yamoussoukro Autonomous District.

=== Religion ===
Religion in Denguélé (2021 census)
Religion	Percent
Islam	93.3%
Christianity	3.9%
None	1.5%
Traditional	0.1%
Other	1.2%

According to the 2021 census, the predominant religion in Denguélé is Islam, practised by 93.3% of the total population. Christians represent 3.9% of the district's population, followed by those with no religion at 1.5%.
