= Regions of Ivory Coast =

The 31 current regions. Green lines indicate borders of regions. Orange lines indicate borders of autonomous districts that are not divided into regions.

The regions of Ivory Coast (French: régions de la Côte d'Ivoire) are the second-level subdivisions of Ivory Coast. There are 31 regions, and each region is subdivided into two or more departments, the third-level division in Ivory Coast. Two to four regions are combined to make up an autonomous district, the first-level subdivision. The autonomous districts of Abidjan and Yamoussoukro are not divided into regions.

== History ==
The first 10 regions were established in 1990. At the time, they supplanted the departments as the first-level administrative subdivisions of the country, with the departments being converted into second-level subdivisions. Two new regions were added in 1996. Four new regions were added in 1997, and all the existing regions changed their names, bringing the total to 16. In 2000, four of the regions were divided to create three more regions, bringing the total to 19.

Prior to the 2011 reorganisation of the subdivisions of Ivory Coast, the 19 regions were the first-level subdivision of the country. In the reorganisation, districts were created and replaced regions as the first-level subdivisions and the 19 regions were reorganized into 30. In 2012, one region was divided to create a 31st region.

In 2014, the districts were abolished except for the two autonomous districts of Abidjan and Yamoussoukro. Then in 2021 the former districts were reinstated as autonomous districts.

=== Maps of regions through the time ===
Map	Years effective	First-level subdivisions	Second-level subdivisions	Third-level subdivisions	Changes
	1991–1996	10 regions	50 departments	—	Creation of regions
	1996–1997	12 regions	55 departments	—	Two regions added.
	1997–2000	16 regions	59 departments	—	Three regions added, all renamed.
	2000–2011	19 regions	59, then 70, 72, 89, 94, 95 departments	—	Three regions added.
	2011–2012	12 districts and 2 autonomous districts	30 regions	95 departments	Districts established. New organization of regions.
	2012–2014	12 districts and 2 autonomous districts	31 regions	107, then 108 departments	One region added (Moronou).
	2014–2021	31 regions and 2 autonomous districts	108, then 111 departments	—	Districts abolished.
	2021–	14 autonomous districts	31 regions	111 departments	12 autonomous districts added, based on former districts

== Governance and purpose ==
The executive of each region is headed by a prefect, who is appointed by the council of ministers (cabinet) of the national government. For departments that house regional capitals, the prefect of the department is the same individual as the prefect of the region, though the two offices of prefect remain distinct. The legislative body of the region is the Regional Council, which is elected and headed by a president.

The government of each region is responsible for designing and implementing programmes to improve the economic, social, and cultural life of the region. Regions are also responsible for coordinating and harmonising the activities of their departmental governments and for implementing public interest projects established by the district or the national government.

== Regions ==
There are currently 31 regions of Ivory Coast. Two areas of the country, the autonomous districts of Abidjan and Yamoussoukro, are not divided into regions. The regions are as follows, with the date of creation in parentheses:

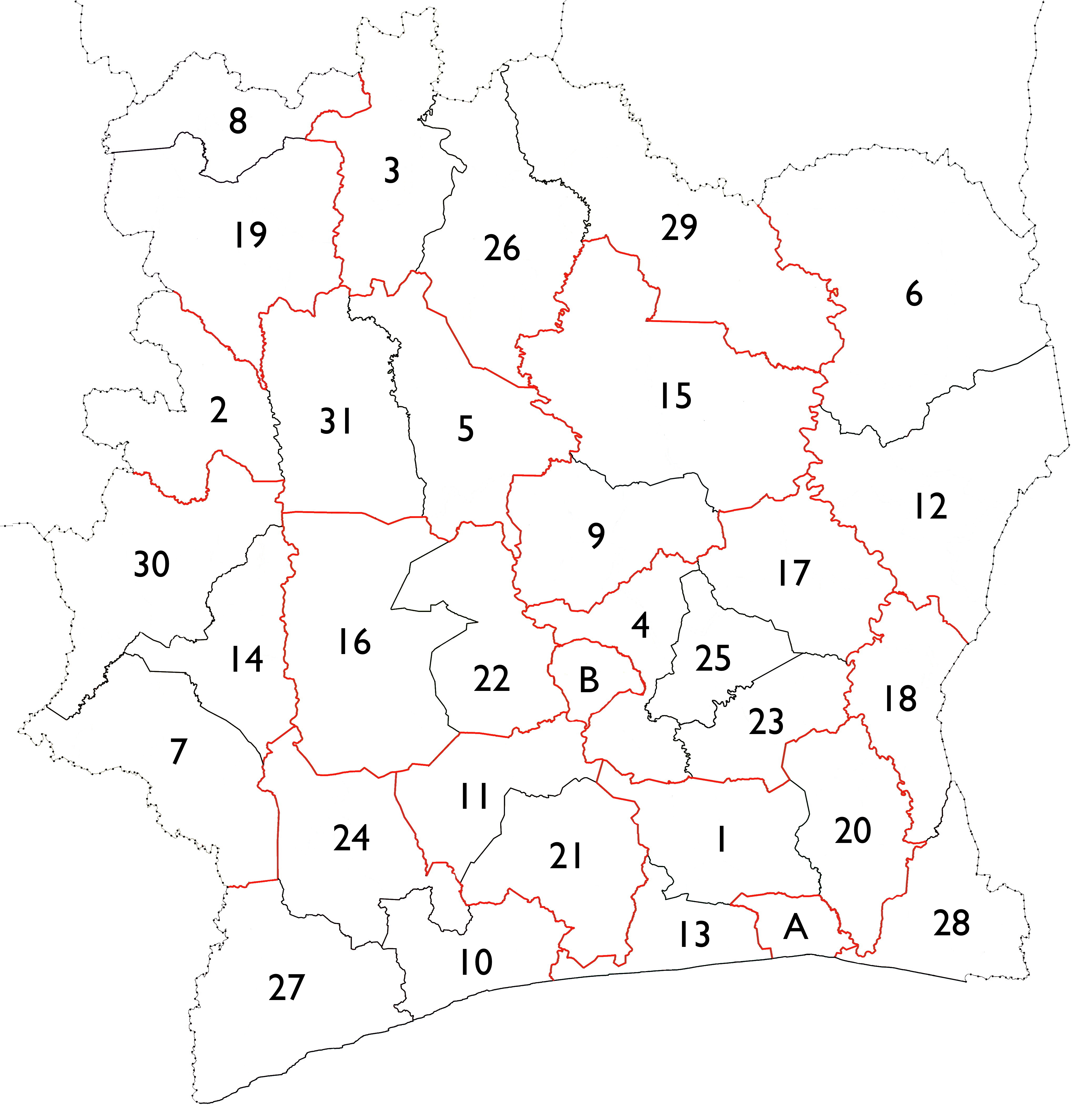

1. Agnéby-Tiassa (2011)
2. Bafing (2000)
3. Bagoué (2011)
4. Bélier Region (2011)
5. Béré (2011)
6. Bounkani (2011)
7. Cavally (2011)
8. Folon (2011)
9. Gbêkê (2011)
10. Gbôklé (2011)
11. Gôh (2011)
12. Gontougo (2011)
13. Grands-Ponts (2011)
14. Guémon (2011)
15. Hambol (2011)
16. Haut-Sassandra (1997)
17. Iffou (2011)
18. Indénié-Djuablin (2011)
19. Kabadougou (2011)
20. La Mé (2011)
21. Lôh-Djiboua (2011)
22. Marahoué (1997)
23. Moronou (2012)
24. Nawa (2011)
25. N'Zi (2011)
26. Poro (2011)
27. San-Pédro (2011)
28. Sud-Comoé (1997)
29. Tchologo (2011)
30. Tonkpi (2011)
31. Worodougou (1997)

A. Abidjan Autonomous District (2011) (not a region or divided into regions)
B. Yamoussoukro Autonomous District (2011) (not a region or divided into regions)

The 14 autonomous districts (of which two are not subdivided into regions) and the 31 regions are listed below, with their regional seats and populations at the 2014 census.

District	District capital	Regions	Region seat	Population
Abidjan (District Autonome d'Abidjan)				4,707,404
Bas-Sassandra (District du Bas-Sassandra)	San-Pédro	Gbôklé	Sassandra	400,798
Bas-Sassandra (District du Bas-Sassandra)	San-Pédro	Nawa	Soubré	1,053,084
Bas-Sassandra (District du Bas-Sassandra)	San-Pédro	San-Pédro	San-Pédro	826,666
Comoé (District du Comoé)	Abengourou	Indénié-Djuablin	Abengourou	560,432
Comoé (District du Comoé)	Abengourou	Sud-Comoé	Aboisso	642,620
Denguélé (District du Denguélé)	Odienné	Folon	Minignan	96,415
Denguélé (District du Denguélé)	Odienné	Kabadougou	Odienné	193,364
Gôh-Djiboua (District du Gôh-Djiboua)	Gagnoa	Gôh	Gagnoa	876,117
Gôh-Djiboua (District du Gôh-Djiboua)	Gagnoa	Lôh-Djiboua	Divo	729,169
Lacs (District des Lacs)	Dimbokro	Bélier	Yamoussoukro	346,768
Lacs (District des Lacs)	Dimbokro	Iffou	Daoukro	311,642
Lacs (District des Lacs)	Dimbokro	Moronou	Bongouanou	352,616
Lacs (District des Lacs)	Dimbokro	N'Zi	Dimbokro	247,578
Lagunes (District des Lagunes)	Dabou	Agnéby-Tiassa	Agboville	606,852
Lagunes (District des Lagunes)	Dabou	Grands-Ponts	Dabou	356,495
Lagunes (District des Lagunes)	Dabou	La Mé	Adzopé	514,700
Montagnes (District des Montagnes)	Man	Cavally	Guiglo	459,964
Montagnes (District des Montagnes)	Man	Guémon	Duékoué	919,392
Montagnes (District des Montagnes)	Man	Tonkpi	Man	992,564
Sassandra-Marahoué (District du Sassandra-Marahoué)	Daloa	Haut-Sassandra	Daloa	1,430,960
Sassandra-Marahoué (District du Sassandra-Marahoué)	Daloa	Marahoué	Bouaflé	862,344
Savanes (District des Savanes)	Korhogo	Bagoué	Boundiali	375,687
Savanes (District des Savanes)	Korhogo	Poro	Korhogo	763,852
Savanes (District des Savanes)	Korhogo	Tchologo	Ferkessédougou	467,958
Vallée du Bandama (District de la Vallée du Bandama)	Bouaké	Gbêkê	Bouaké	1,010,849
Vallée du Bandama (District de la Vallée du Bandama)	Bouaké	Hambol	Katiola	429,977
Woroba (District du Woroba)	Séguéla	Béré	Mankono	389,758
Woroba (District du Woroba)	Séguéla	Bafing	Touba	183,047
Woroba (District du Woroba)	Séguéla	Worodougou	Séguéla	272,334
Yamoussoukro (District Autonome du Yamoussoukro)				355,573
Zanzan (District du Zanzan)	Bondoukou	Bounkani	Bouna	267,167
Zanzan (District du Zanzan)	Bondoukou	Gontougo	Bondoukou	667,185

== Regions before 2011 ==
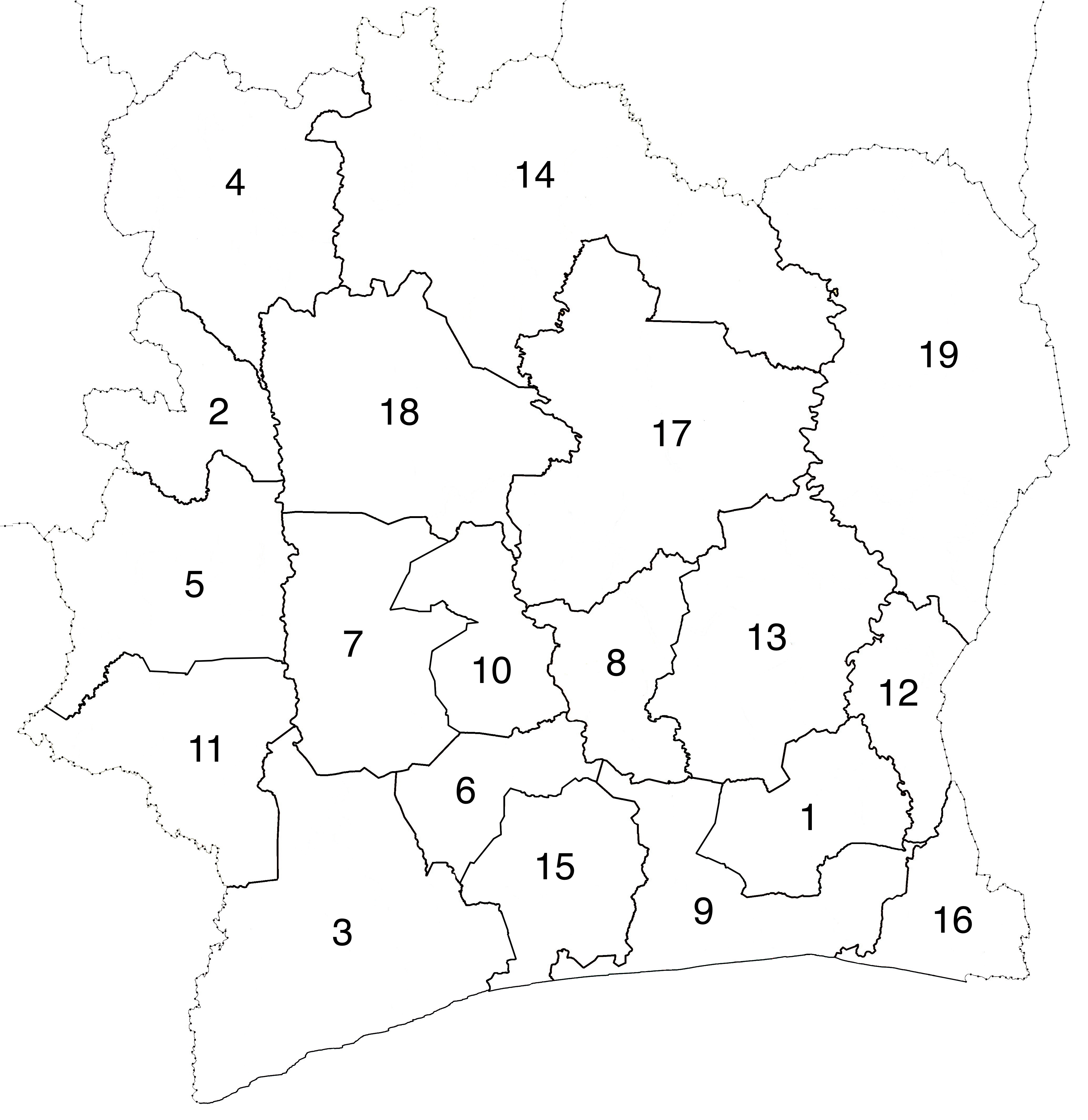

Before a reorganization in 2011, the regions were the first-level subdivisions of Ivory Coast. The 19 regions that existed immediately prior to the reorganisation were as follows, with their creation date in parentheses:

1. Agnéby (1997)
2. Bafing (2000)
3. Bas-Sassandra (1997)
4. Denguélé (1997)
5. Dix-Huit Montagnes (1997)
6. Fromager (2000)
7. Haut-Sassandra (1997)
8. Lacs (1997)
9. Lagunes (1997)
10. Marahoué (1997)
11. Moyen-Cavally (2000)
12. Moyen-Comoé (1997)
13. N'Zi-Comoé (1997)
14. Savanes (1997)
15. Sud-Bandama (1997)
16. Sud-Comoé (1997)
17. Vallée du Bandama (1997)
18. Worodougou (1997)
19. Zanzan (1997)

As is the case now, regions were further divided into departments.

== See also ==
- ISO 3166-2:CI

== Bibliography ==
- SATO Akira (2003). "L'évolution historique de la subdivision territoriale administrative en Côte d'Ivoire" in L'administration locale en Côte d'Ivoire. Africa Research Studies 10. 日本貿易振興機構（ジェトロ）アジア経済研究所 / Institute of Developing Economies, Japan External Trade Organization (IDE-JETRO). 2003. On-line.
