= Assagny National Park =

National park in Ivory Coast

- IUCN category II (national park)
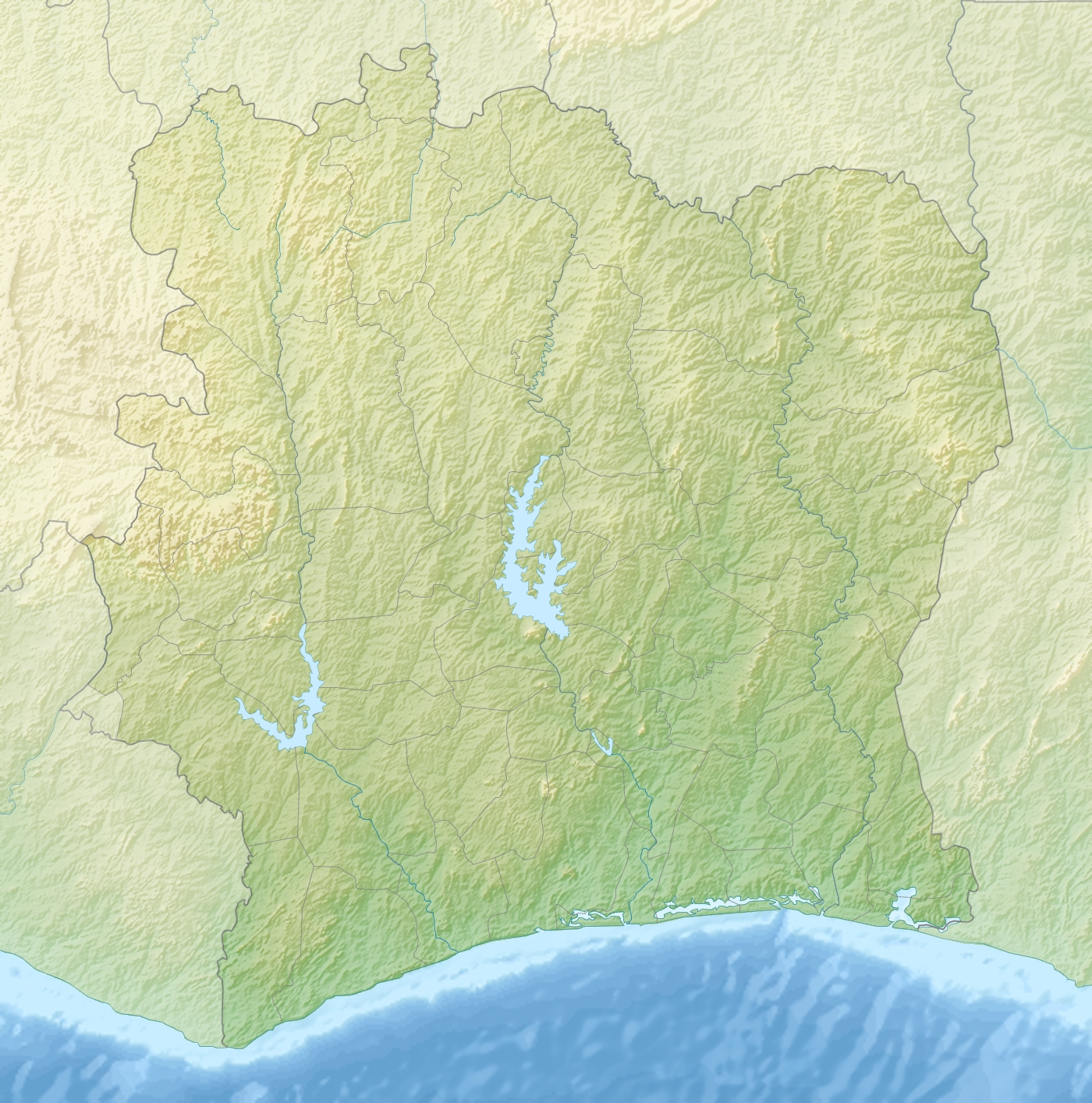
- Location within Ivory Coast
- Interactive map of Assagny National Park
- Location: Côte d'Ivoire
- Nearest city: Grand-Lahou
- Coordinates: 5°12′N 4°53′W
- Area: 19,400 km^{2} (7,500 sq mi)
- Established: January 1981

Ramsar Wetland
- Official name: Parc national d'Azagny
- Designated: 27 February 1996
- Reference no.: 790

Assagny National Park or Azagny National Park is a national park in the south of Ivory Coast. It is situated on the coast some 75 km (47 mi) to the west of Abidjan, between the mouth of the Bandama River and the Ébrié Lagoon, and occupies an area of about 17,000 hectares (42,000 acres).

== Description ==
Assagny National Park is located in Ivory Coast adjoining the Gulf of Guinea. To the west lies the Bandama River and to the east the Ébrié Lagoon, the park being traversed by the navigable Asagni Canal which connects the two. The park is surrounded by slightly higher ground and consists of a broad, often waterlogged, basin in which the water level fluctuates. The climate here is wet all year round, with an average rainfall of 2,300 mm (91 in). About two thirds of the park consists of swamps dominated by mangroves and there is additionally some moist forest and coastal savanna. The park has potential for tourism.

== Flora ==
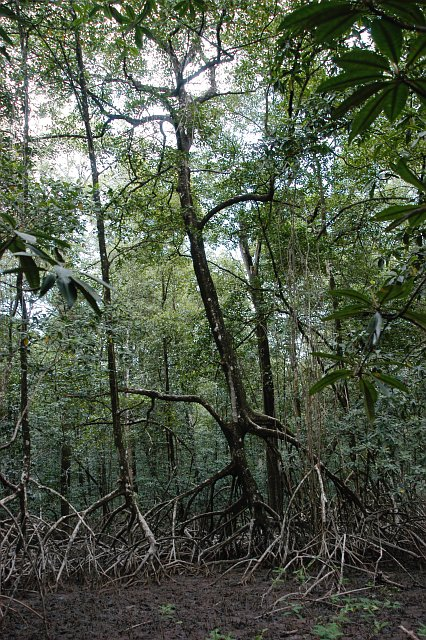
Rhizophora racemosa

The primary forest is dominated by Nauclea diderrichii, Berlinia occidentalis, Strombosia pustulata, Scottellia klaineana, Lovoa trichilioides, Gilbertiodendron preussii, Discoglypremna caloneura, Parinari excelsa, Guarea cedrata, Nesogordonia papaverifera, Erythrophleum ivorense, Tieghemella heckelii, Klainedoxa gabonensis, Lannea welwitschii and Heritiera utilis. The main trees present in the swamps are Rhizophora racemosa and Avicennia germinans, along with many palms including Phoenix reclinata, Borassus aethiopum and Raphia, as well as a variety of swamp vegetation including Echinochloa pyramidalis. The savanna areas are mostly covered with the grass Imperata cylindrica.

== Fauna ==
There are elephants, chimpanzees and many species of monkey in the forests, as well as bushpigs and African forest buffalos. All three species of West African crocodile occur here, Crocodylus suchus, Crocodylus palustris and Mecistops cataphractus, but in low numbers and the African manatee occurs in the Ébrié Lagoon. An attempt to increase the number of bay duikers in the park was unsuccessful because of predation by pythons.

The park is an important habitat for wetland birds and was recognized as such when it became a Ramsar site in 2005. Some bird species of note include the cattle egret, the little egret, the grey heron, the black-crowned night heron and the peregrine falcon. BirdLife International recognize the park as being an Important Bird Area.

== See also ==
- National park
- Gulf of Guinea
- Asagni Canal
