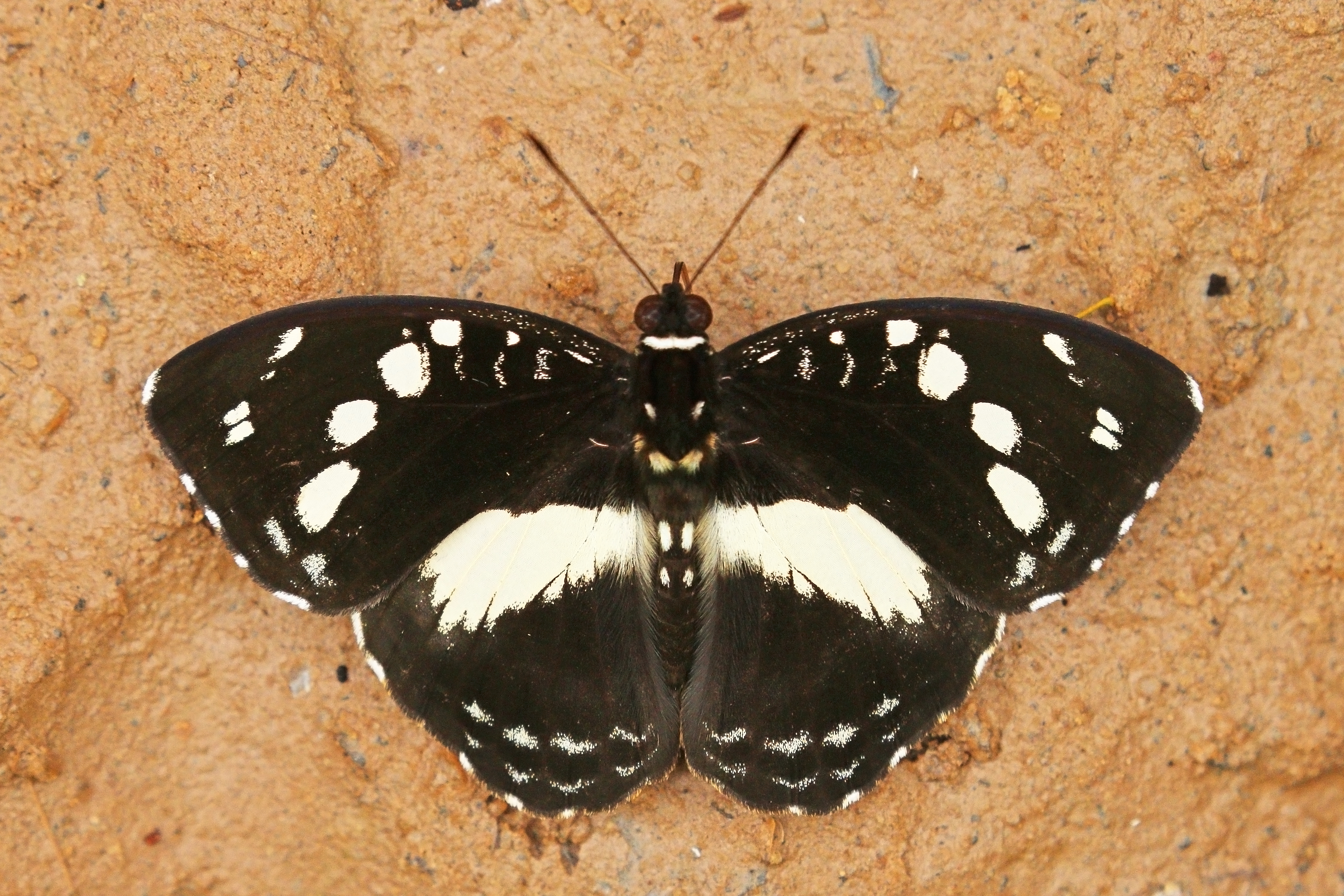

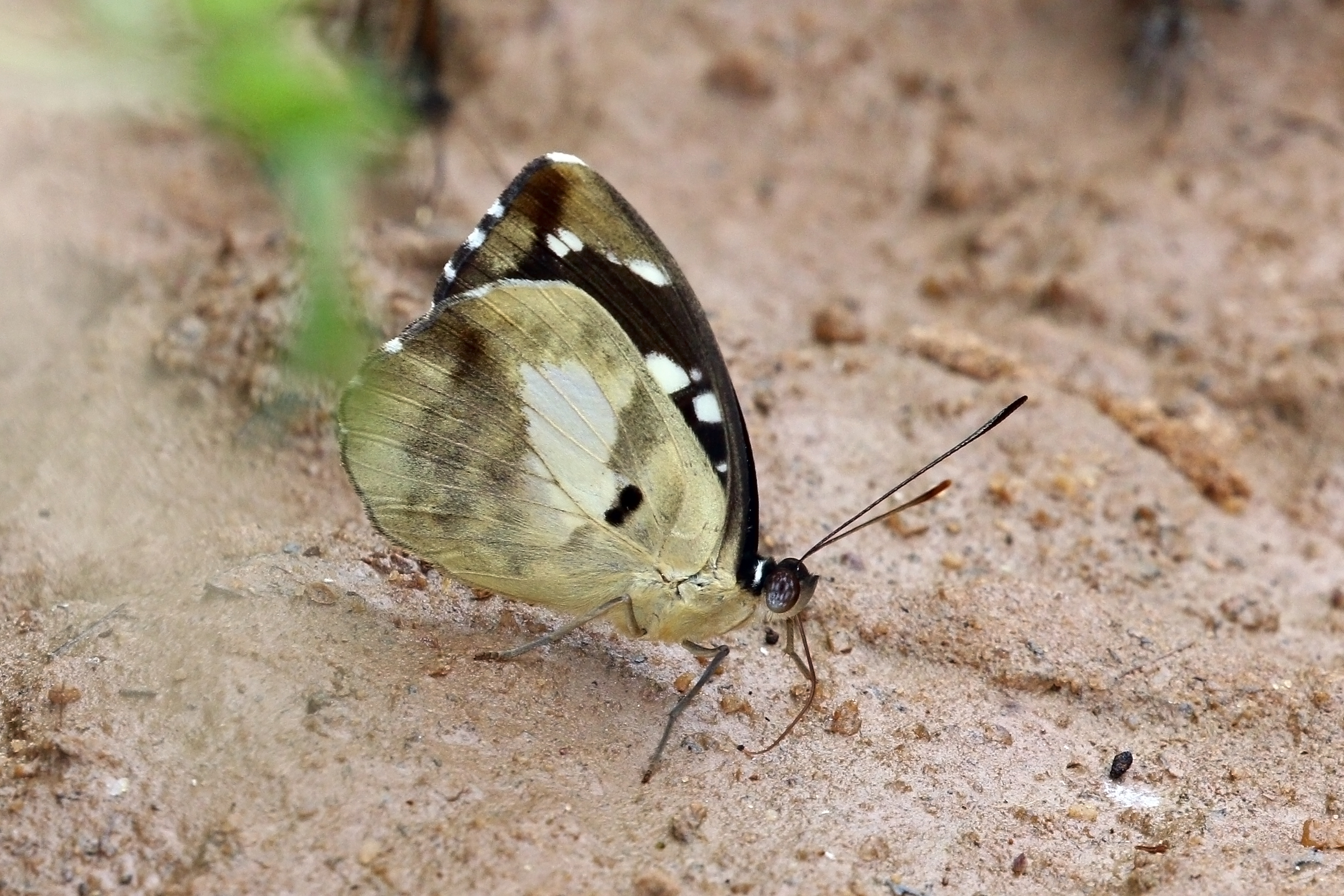
- both male A. g. galene Bobiri Forest, Ghana

Scientific classification
- Kingdom: Animalia
- Phylum: Arthropoda
- Clade: Pancrustacea
- Class: Insecta
- Order: Lepidoptera
- Family: Nymphalidae
- Genus: Aterica
- Species: A. galene

Binomial name
- Aterica galene (Brown, 1776)

Synonyms
- Papilio galene Brown, 1776; Aterica theophane Hopffer, 1855; Papilio cupavia Cramer, 1779; Aterica buchholzi Plötz, 1880; Aterica galene f. dimorpha Bartel, 1905; Aterica galene ab. luteofasciata Schultze, 1920; Aterica galene f. albimacula Joicey and Talbot, 1921; Aterica galene galene ab. juncta Dufrane, 1933; Aterica galene galene f. pierardi Dufrane, 1933; Aterica galene ab. dechroma Strand, 1911; Aterica galene omissa Rothschild, 1918

= Aterica galene =

Species of butterfly

Aterica galene, the forest glade nymph, is a butterfly of the family Nymphalidae. It is found in Africa.

The wingspan is 45–55 mm.

The larvae feed on Combretum, Quisqualis indica, Quisqualis littorea, Terminalia glaucescens and Scottellia

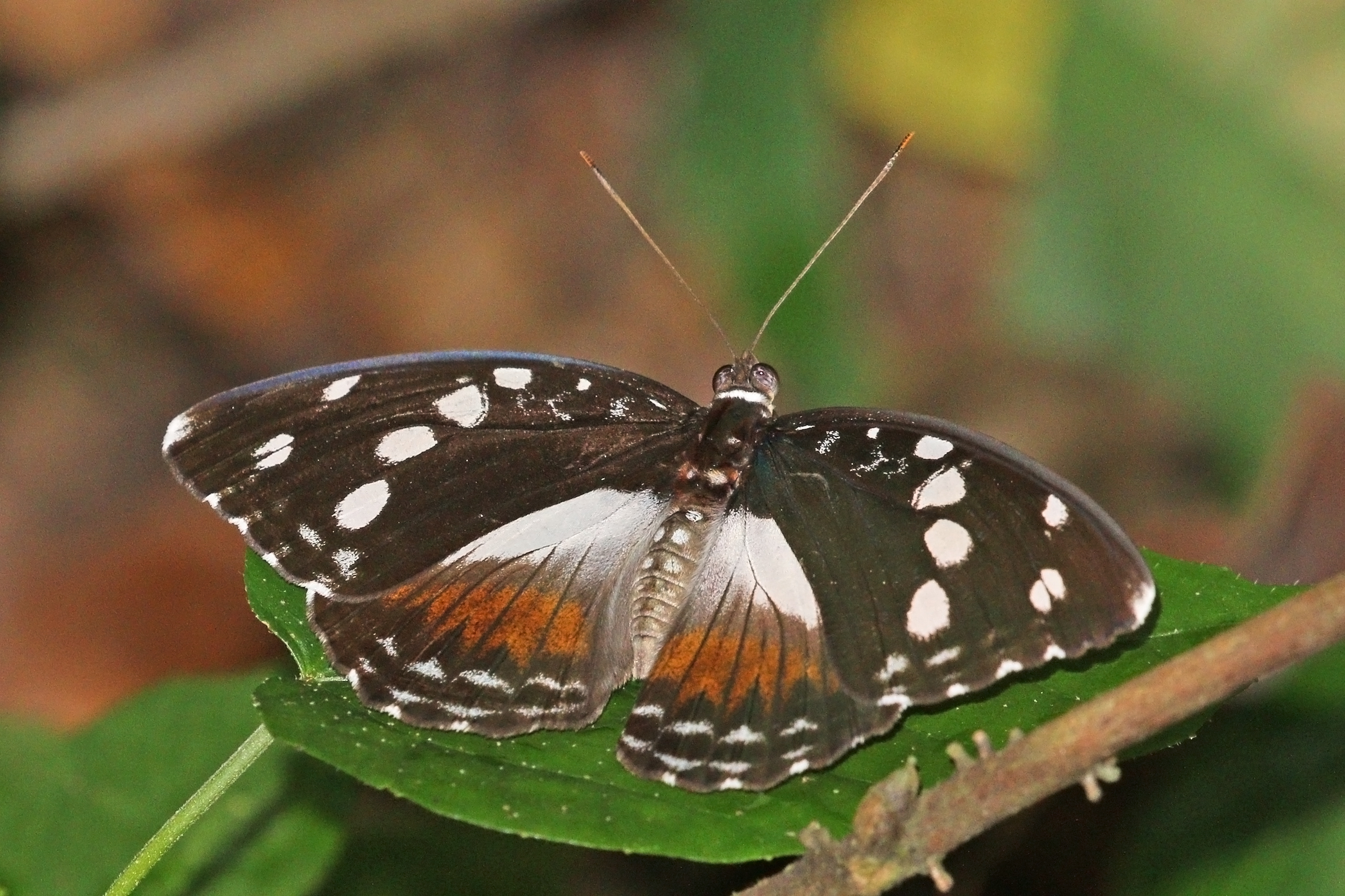
female A. g. galene
Bobiri Forest, Ghana

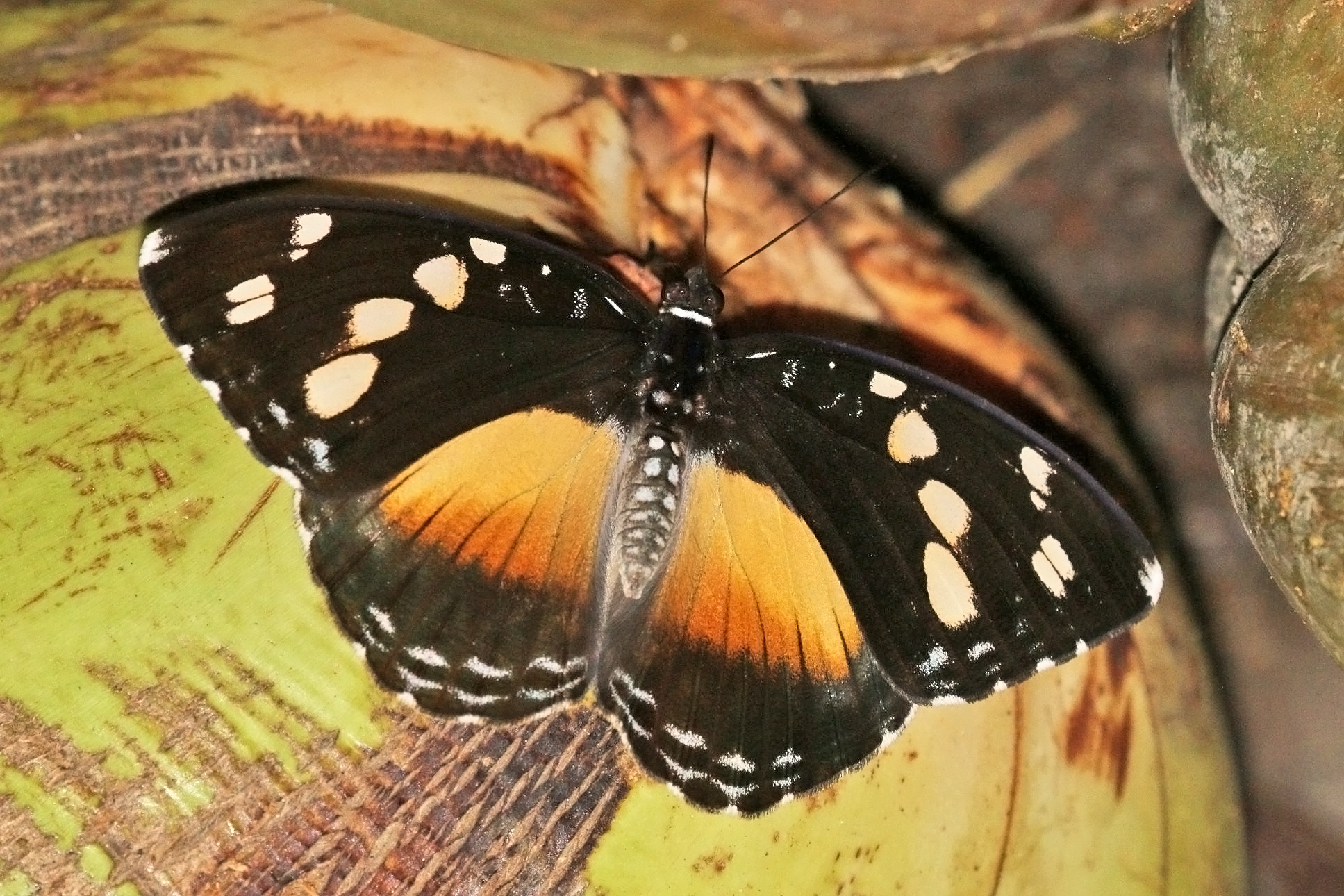
female A. g. galene orange form
Bobiri Forest, Ghana

== Subspecies ==
- Aterica galene galene (western Kenya, Uganda, western Tanzania to Zaire, Angola, Cameroon, Senegal)
- Aterica galene theophane Hopffer, 1855 (Kenya to Mozambique, Rhodesia, Malawi)
- Aterica galene incisa Rothschild & Jordan, 1903 (Ethiopia)
- Aterica galene extensa Heron, 1909 (Cameroon, Gabon, Congo, Angola, Democratic Republic of the Congo, Uganda, western Kenya, western Tanzania, Zambia)

Torben Larsen developed a species numbering system for his 2005 publication Butterflies of West Africa. The nominate subspecies is #953. The 'Larsen' numbers have since been used with permission in A Sharp Eye on Butterflies of Ghana.
