= Dikbas =

Dikbas is a common name for several plants and may refer to:

- Dombeya rotundifolia
- Lannea discolor

== See also ==
- Ugur Meric Dikbas, researcher
- Oguz Dikbas, researcher at Giresun University
