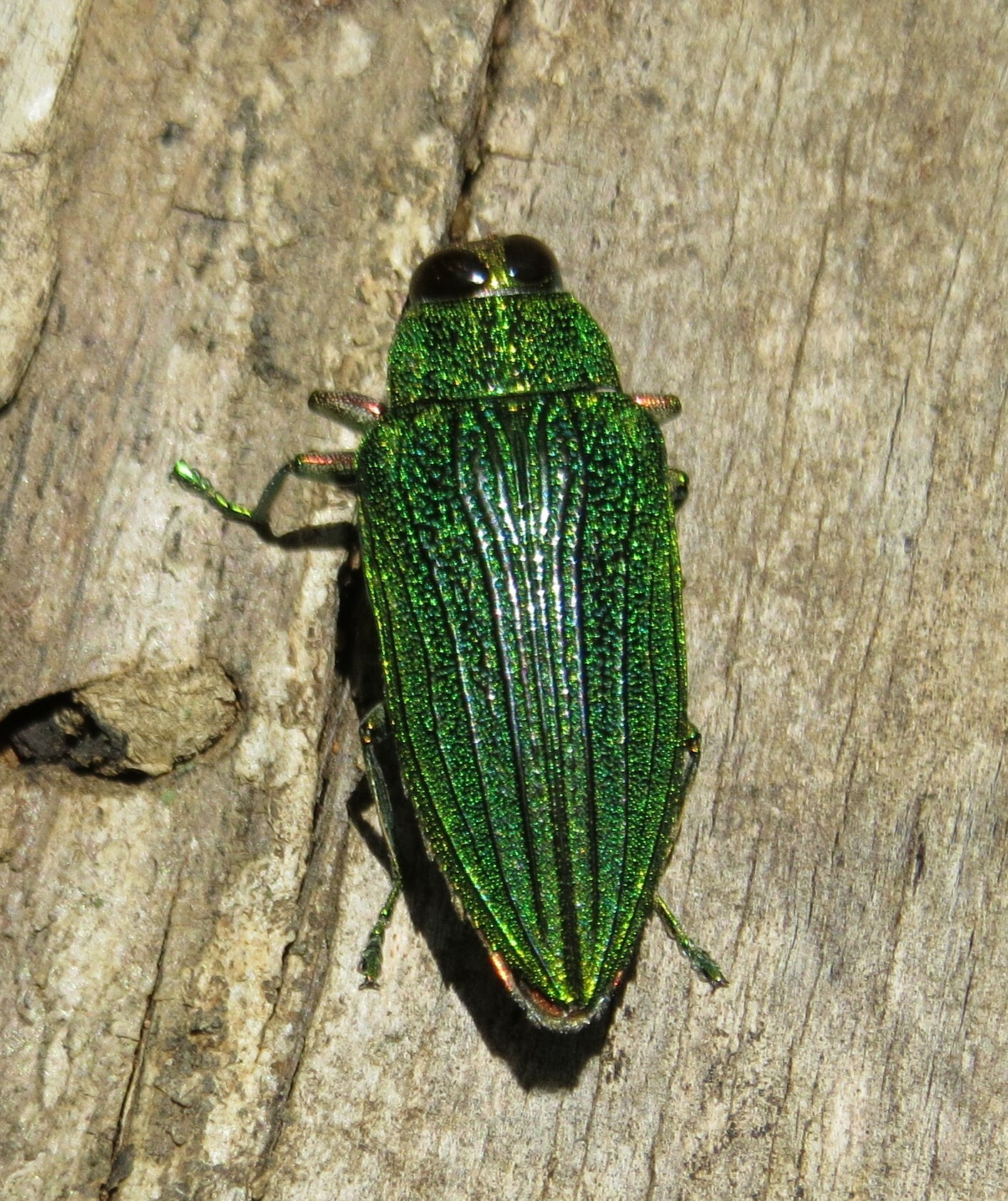

Scientific classification
- Domain: Eukaryota
- Kingdom: Animalia
- Phylum: Arthropoda
- Class: Insecta
- Order: Coleoptera
- Suborder: Polyphaga
- Infraorder: Elateriformia
- Family: Buprestidae
- Genus: Evides
- Species: E. pubiventris

Binomial name
- Evides pubiventris (Laporte & Gory, 1835)

Synonyms
- Chrysodema pubiventris Laporte & Gory, 1835; Evides cupriventris Thomson, 1878

= Evides pubiventris =

Species of beetles

Evides pubiventris is a South African wood-boring jewel beetle species in the family of Buprestidae. It has a metallic green coloration that is not reflective in the near-infrared renge of the spectrum. Its host-tree is Lannea discolor.
