= Uvariodendron gorgonis =

Conservation status
- Endangered (IUCN 3.1)

Scientific classification
- Kingdom: Plantae
- Clade: Embryophytes
- Clade: Tracheophytes
- Clade: Spermatophytes
- Clade: Angiosperms
- Clade: Magnoliids
- Order: Magnoliales
- Family: Annonaceae
- Genus: Uvariodendron
- Species: U. gorgonis

Binomial name
- Uvariodendron gorgonis Verdc.

Species of tree

Uvariodendron gorgonis is a species of flowering plant in the family Annonaceae. It is native to Kenya and Tanzania. It is a tree that grows in various forests alongside Cola pseudoclavata, Lannea welwitschii, Diospyros kabuyeana, and Combretum schumannii. It is threatened by habitat loss as forests are cleared and degraded by agriculture.
