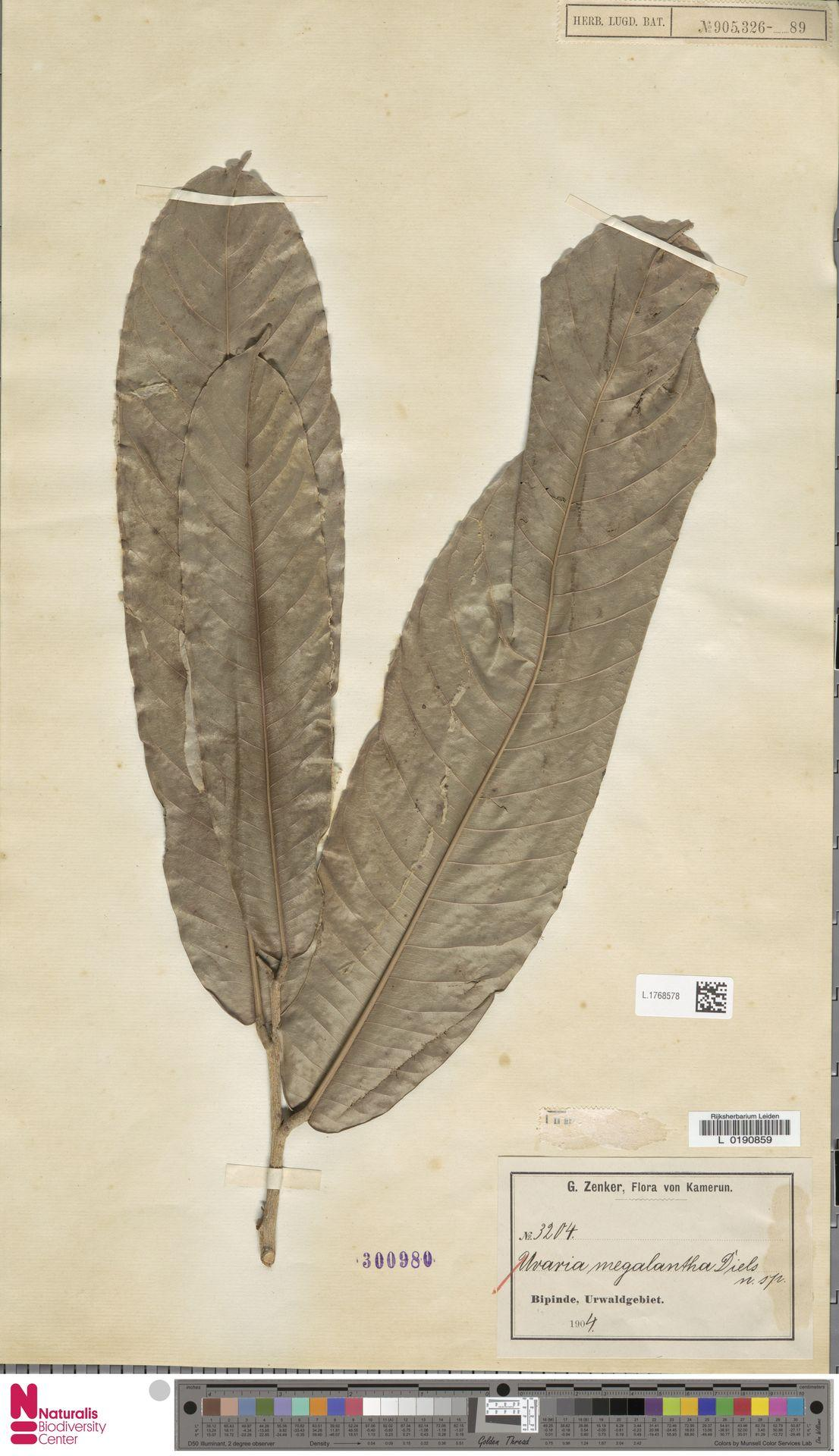

Scientific classification
- Kingdom: Plantae
- Clade: Embryophytes
- Clade: Tracheophytes
- Clade: Spermatophytes
- Clade: Angiosperms
- Clade: Magnoliids
- Order: Magnoliales
- Family: Annonaceae
- Tribe: Monodoreae
- Genus: Uvariodendron (Engl. & Diels) R.E.Fr.

= Uvariodendron =

Genus of flowering plants

Uvariodendron is a genus of flowering plants in the family Annonaceae. It includes 18 species native to tropical Africa.

== Species ==
18 species are accepted.

- Uvariodendron angustifolium (Engl. & Diels) R.E.Fr.
- Uvariodendron anisatum Verdc.
- Uvariodendron calophyllum R.E.Fr.
- Uvariodendron citriodorum Dagallier & Couvreur
- Uvariodendron connivens (Benth.) R.E.Fr.
- Uvariodendron dzomboense Dagallier, Q.Luke & Couvreur
- Uvariodendron fuscum (Benth.) R.E.Fr.
  - Uvariodendron fuscum var. giganteum (Engl.) Dagallier & Couvreur
- Uvariodendron gorgonis Verdc.
- Uvariodendron kimbozaense Dagallier & Couvreur
- Uvariodendron kirkii Verdc.
- Uvariodendron mbagoi Dagallier & Couvreur
- Uvariodendron molundense (Diels) R.E.Fr.
- Uvariodendron mossambicense Robson ex Dagallier & Couvreur
- Uvariodendron occidentale Le Thomas
- Uvariodendron pilosicarpum Dagallier & Couvreur
- Uvariodendron pycnophyllum (Diels) R.E.Fr.
- Uvariodendron schmidtii Q.Luke, Dagallier & Couvreur
- Uvariodendron usambarense R.E.Fr.

=== Formerly placed here ===
- Polyceratocarpus oligocarpus (Verdc.) Dagallier (as Uvariodendron oligocarpum Verdc.)
