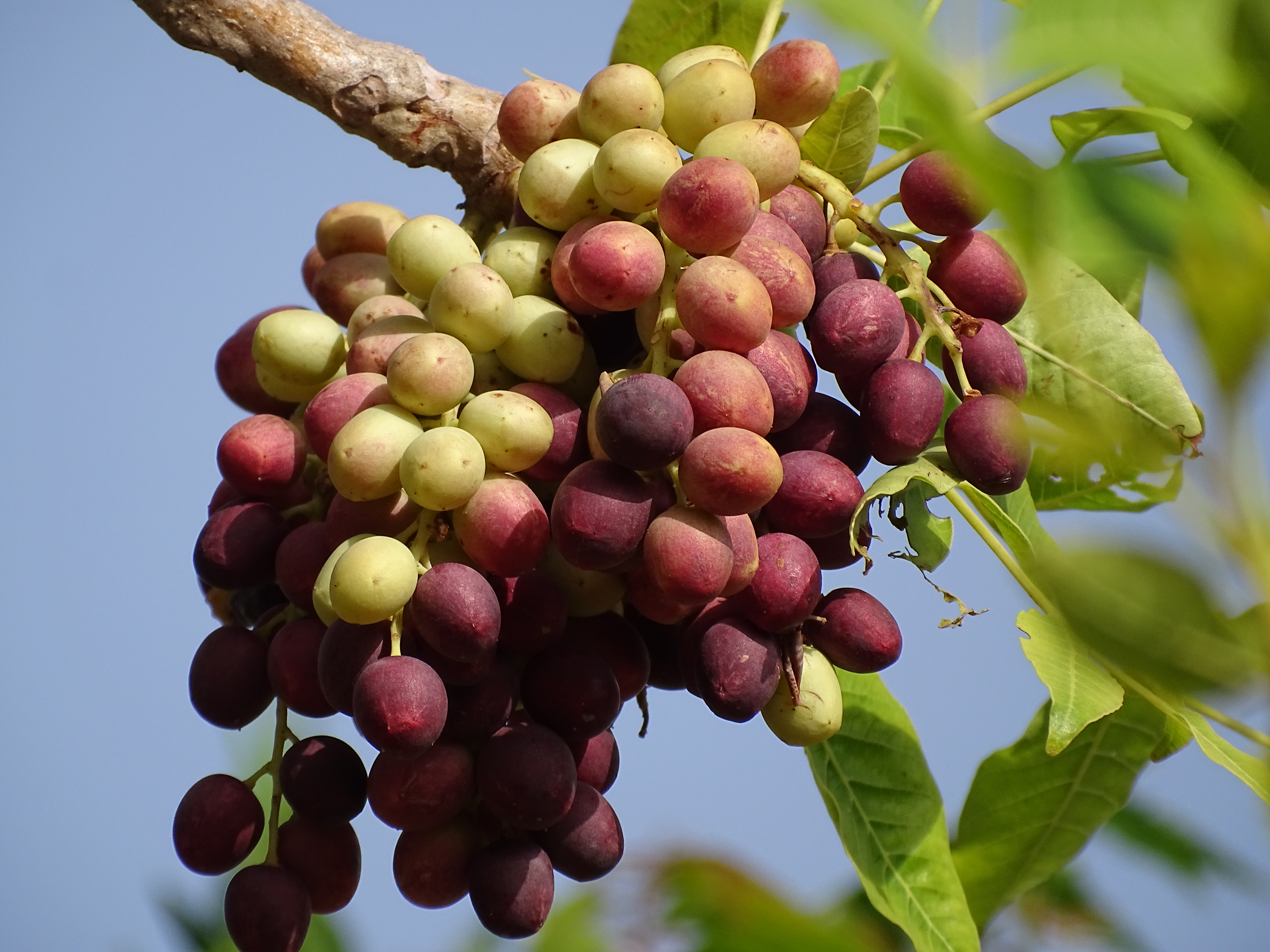

Conservation status
- Least Concern (IUCN 3.1)

Scientific classification
- Kingdom: Plantae
- Clade: Tracheophytes
- Clade: Angiosperms
- Clade: Eudicots
- Clade: Rosids
- Order: Sapindales
- Family: Anacardiaceae
- Genus: Lannea
- Species: L. microcarpa

Binomial name
- Lannea microcarpa Engl. & K.Krause

Synonyms
- Lannea djalonica A.Chev. Lannea oleosa A.Chev.

= Lannea microcarpa =

Species of dioecious plant

Lannea microcarpa is a dioecious plant within the Anacardiaceae family. It is also called African grapes and occurs in the Sudan and Guinea savanna of West Africa from Senegal to Cameroon. The plant is used to dye basilan fini, a traditional cloth in a red and brown colour.

== Description ==
The species is capable of growing up to 15 m high with a rather short trunk and dense crown, it has a grey and smooth bark with a reddish and white fibrous slash. Leaves; alternate and imparipinnate, up to 23 cm long, with 2–3 leaflets per pinnae; leaf-blade is narrowly ovate in outline, 5–13 cm long and 2.5–6 cm wide, leaflets have a rough and waxy adaxial surface. Inflorescence is terminal raceme. Fruits are ellipsoid in shape, grows in raceme like bundles of between 3-25, purple to blackish color when ripe.

== Distribution ==
Occurs in the Sudanian and Guinea savannas of West Africa and in Cameroon.

== Chemistry ==
Chemical compounds isolated from the leaves of Lannea microcarpa include polyphenols and novel flavanoids such as 4'-methoxy-myricetin 3-O-α-L-rhamnopyranoside, myricetin 3-O-α-L-rhamnopyranoside, and myricetin 3-O-β-D-glucopyranoside, vitexin, isovitexin, and gallic acid.

== Uses ==
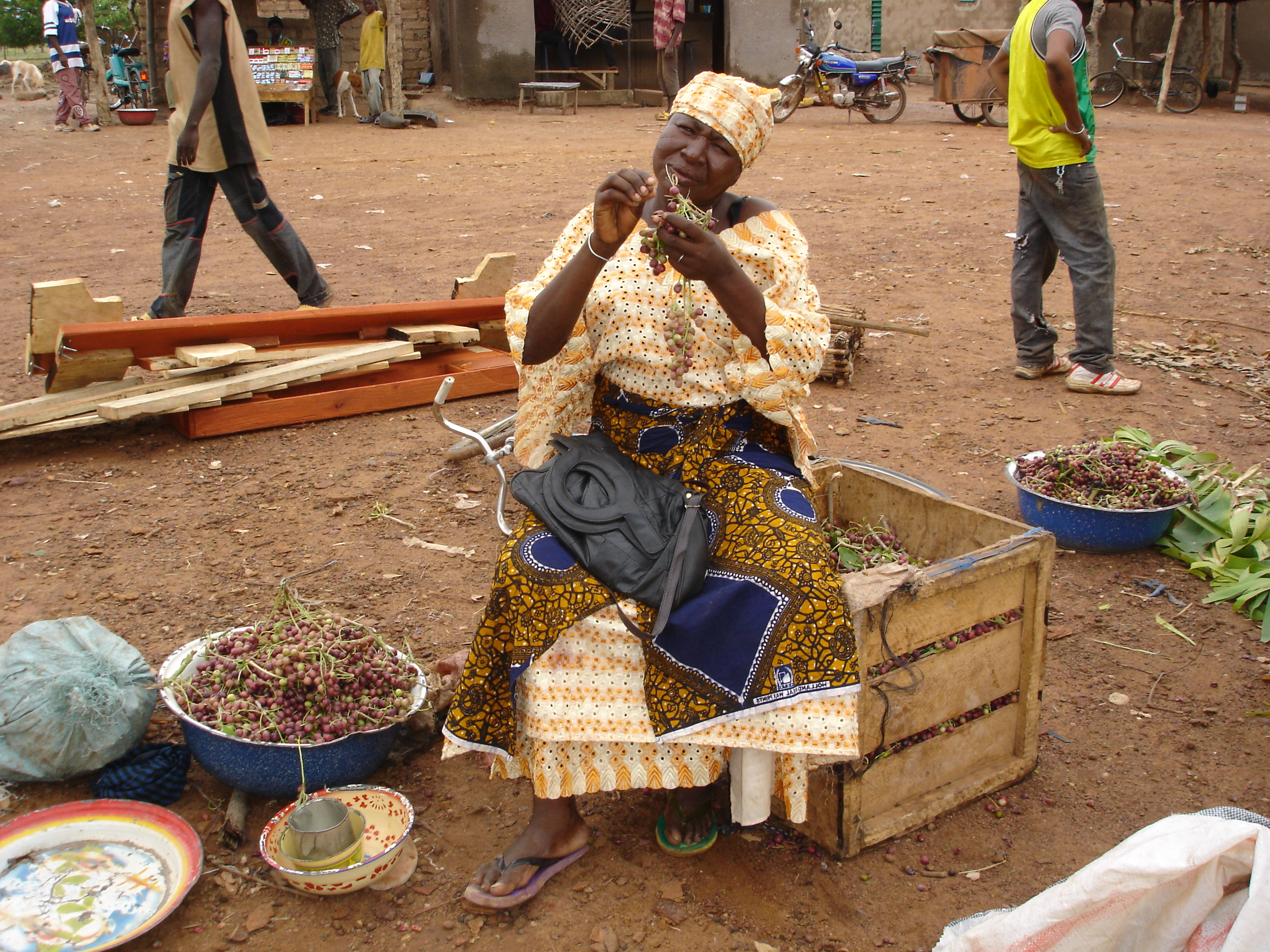
A woman processing Lannea microcarpa fruits in Burkina Faso.

Leaf extracts of the species is traditionally used in would healing process and for topical treatments of various ailments including conjunctivitis, gingivitis and stomatitis. A root bark decoction is applied to treat stomach and skin related troubles. Its leaves and fruits are collected and eaten by locals. The exudate from the bark is applied in the dyeing process of hand-made cloths, red-brown dye is applied to basil-lan fini, a traditional medicine cloth and other locally handmade fabrics.
