= Gilbertiodendron robynsianum =

Conservation status
- Vulnerable (IUCN 2.3)

Scientific classification
- Kingdom: Plantae
- Clade: Tracheophytes
- Clade: Angiosperms
- Clade: Eudicots
- Clade: Rosids
- Order: Fabales
- Family: Fabaceae
- Genus: Gilbertiodendron
- Species: G. robynsianum

Binomial name
- Gilbertiodendron robynsianum Aubrév. & Pellegr.

Species of legume

Gilbertiodendron robynsianum is a species of plant in the family Fabaceae. It is found only in the Ivory Coast. It is threatened by habitat loss.
