= Asagni Canal =

Ivory Coast canal

The Asagni Canal, or Canal d'Asagni, is a navigable canal in Ivory Coast, connecting the Bandama River to the Ébrié Lagoon. It is 18 km (11 mi) long and was constructed in 1923. It passes through the Assagny National Park.
