= Gilbertiodendron tonkolili =

Conservation status
- Endangered (IUCN 3.1)

Scientific classification
- Kingdom: Plantae
- Clade: Tracheophytes
- Clade: Angiosperms
- Clade: Eudicots
- Clade: Rosids
- Order: Fabales
- Family: Fabaceae
- Genus: Gilbertiodendron
- Species: G. tonkolili

Binomial name
- Gilbertiodendron tonkolili Burgt & Estrella
- Distribution; Native range

Species of plant

Gilbertiodendron tonkolili is a species of tree in the family Fabaceae. The species is native to Guinea and Sierra Leone. The species was assessed for The IUCN Red List of Threatened Species as endangered.
