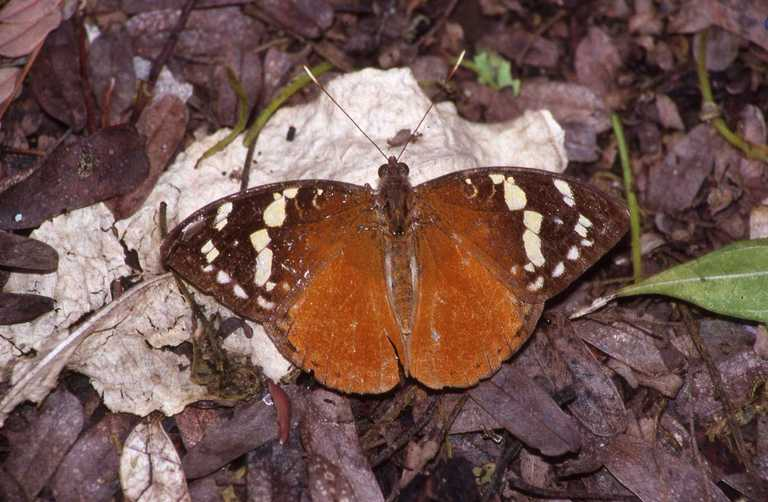
- Aterica rabena

Scientific classification
- Domain: Eukaryota
- Kingdom: Animalia
- Phylum: Arthropoda
- Class: Insecta
- Order: Lepidoptera
- Family: Nymphalidae
- Tribe: Adoliadini
- Genus: Aterica; Boisduval, 1833

Species
- Numerous, see text

= Aterica =

Genus of brush-footed butterflies

Aterica is an Afrotropical genus of brush-footed butterflies.

== Species ==
- Aterica galene (Brown, 1776)
- Aterica rabena Boisduval, 1833
