= Berlinia korupensis =

Conservation status
- Critically Endangered (IUCN 3.1)

Scientific classification
- Kingdom: Plantae
- Clade: Embryophytes
- Clade: Tracheophytes
- Clade: Spermatophytes
- Clade: Angiosperms
- Clade: Eudicots
- Clade: Rosids
- Order: Fabales
- Family: Fabaceae
- Genus: Berlinia
- Species: B. korupensis

Binomial name
- Berlinia korupensis Mackinder & Burgt

Species of legume

Berlinia korupensis is a species of tree up to 42 m (138 ft) tall and 88 cm (35 in) diameter, belonging to the subfamily Caesalpinioideae of the family Fabaceae, and is endemic to the Korup National Park in Cameroon, West Africa. Having produced large, delicate white flowers reminiscent of a Bauhinia, the species' seed pods can grow to be 30 cm long. Seed dispersal is explosive with the opposing halves of the pods tightening as they dry until suddenly they split and shoot seeds for a distance that can be as great as 50 m (160 ft). It is on the Critically Endangered list as thus far only 17 trees have been found. This is a recent discovery, having been unknown to science prior to June 2010.
