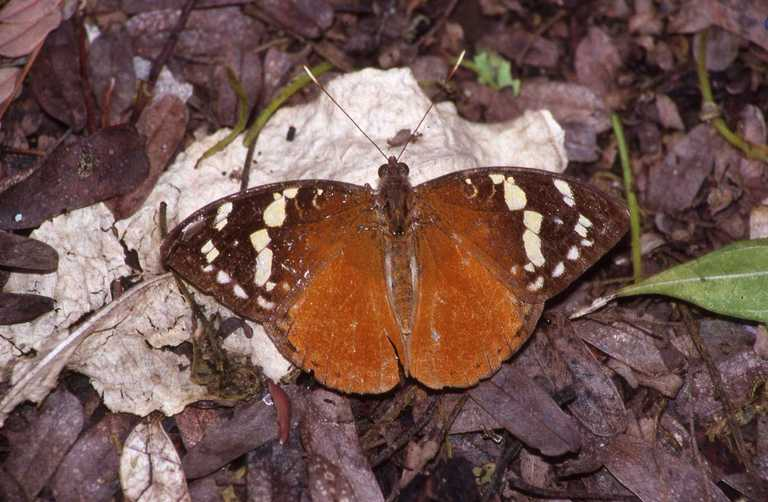

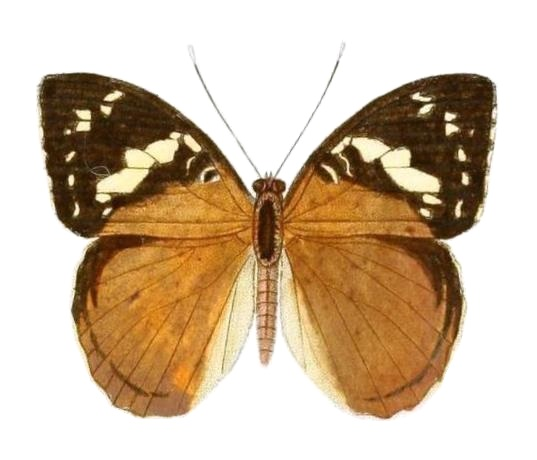

Scientific classification
- Domain: Eukaryota
- Kingdom: Animalia
- Phylum: Arthropoda
- Class: Insecta
- Order: Lepidoptera
- Family: Nymphalidae
- Genus: Aterica
- Species: A. rabena

Binomial name
- Aterica rabena Boisduval, 1833

= Aterica rabena =

Species of butterfly

Aterica rabena is a butterfly in the family Nymphalidae. It is found on Madagascar. The habitat consists of forests.
