= Uvariodendron fuscum =

Conservation status
- Least Concern (IUCN 3.1)

Scientific classification
- Kingdom: Plantae
- Clade: Embryophytes
- Clade: Tracheophytes
- Clade: Spermatophytes
- Clade: Angiosperms
- Clade: Magnoliids
- Order: Magnoliales
- Family: Annonaceae
- Genus: Uvariodendron
- Species: U. fuscum

Binomial name
- Uvariodendron fuscum (Benth.) R.E.Fr.

Varieties
- Uvariodendron fuscum var. fuscum; Uvariodendron fuscum var. giganteum (Engl.) Dagallier & Couvreur; Uvariodendron fuscum var. magnificum (Verdc.) Dagallier & Couvreur

Synonyms
- Uva fusca (Benth.) Kuntze; Uvaria fusca Benth.

Species of flowering plant

Uvariodendron fuscum is a species of flowering plant in the family Annonaceae. It is a tree native to Nigeria, Cameroon, Bioko, Gabon, Democratic Republic of the Congo, and Uganda.

Three varieties are accepted:

- Uvariodendron fuscum var. fuscum – Bioko, Cameroon, and Nigeria
- Uvariodendron fuscum var. giganteum (Engl.) Dagallier & Couvreur – southern Nigeria, Cameroon, Gabon, and Democratic Republic of the Congo
- Uvariodendron fuscum var. magnificum (Verdc.) Dagallier & Couvreur – southwestern and south-central Uganda
