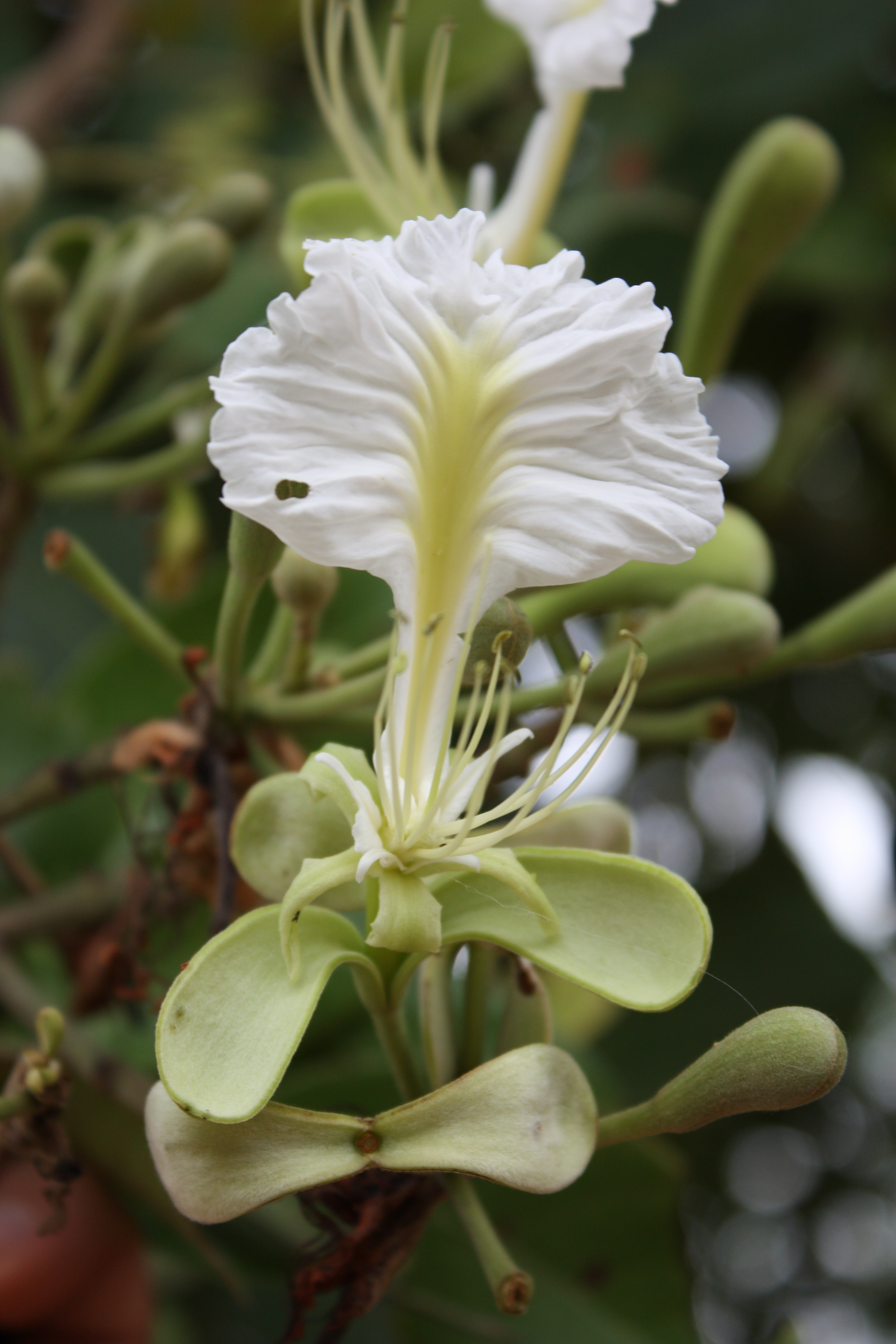
- In Burkina Faso

Conservation status
- Least Concern (IUCN 3.1)

Scientific classification
- Kingdom: Plantae
- Clade: Tracheophytes
- Clade: Angiosperms
- Clade: Eudicots
- Clade: Rosids
- Order: Fabales
- Family: Fabaceae
- Genus: Berlinia
- Species: B. grandiflora

Binomial name
- Berlinia grandiflora (Vahl) Hutch. & Dalziel

= Berlinia grandiflora =

Species of plant

Berlinia grandiflora is a small to medium sized tree found in the West and West Central African region along riparian habitats or gallery forests habitat types.

== Description ==
Berlinia grandiflora is a small to medium sized tree that ranges from 2–20 m tall but can grow up to 30 m. Leaves are paripinnately compound arranged in 3–4 pairs of leaflets per pinnae, the petiole is 20-42 mm long and petiolules is 5–9 mm long; terminal leaflets are 7–22 cm long and 3.0–11.5 cm wide, the abaxial surface is glabrous to sparsely pubescent, leaf-blade is oblong to obovate in outline. Inflorescence is a branched panicle, it has scented green or white colored flowers, commonly with a single petal that is white and 3.5–6.5 cm long, the bracteoles tend to be between 23–32 mm long and 11–20 mm wide; has up to 10 stamens. Fruit is a flattened brown pod.

== Distribution ==
The species is found in Guinea eastwards to the Democratic Republic of the Congo.

== Uses ==
Bark extracts are used as part of a purgative regimen in some communities of the Democratic republic of the Congo and leaves are part of a decoction to treat intestinal ailments. Wood is used in carpentry work.
