= Uvariodendron pycnophyllum =

Conservation status
- Endangered (IUCN 3.1)

Scientific classification
- Kingdom: Plantae
- Clade: Embryophytes
- Clade: Tracheophytes
- Clade: Spermatophytes
- Clade: Angiosperms
- Clade: Magnoliids
- Order: Magnoliales
- Family: Annonaceae
- Genus: Uvariodendron
- Species: U. pycnophyllum

Binomial name
- Uvariodendron pycnophyllum (Diels) R.E.Fr.

Synonyms
- Uvaria pycnophylla Diels

Species of flowering plant

Uvariodendron pycnophyllum is a species of flowering plant in the family Annonaceae. It is a tree endemic to northeastern Tanzania.
