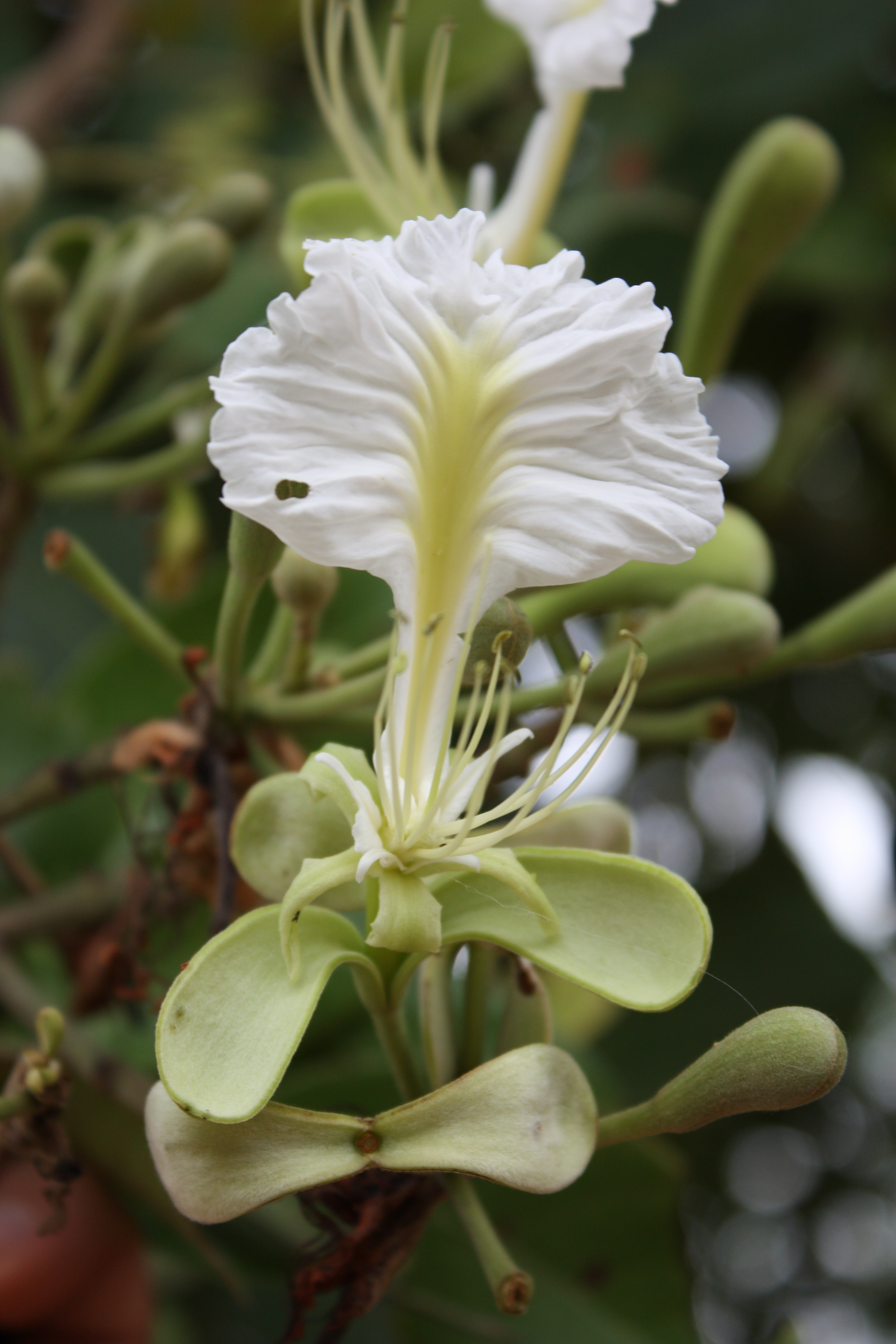
- Flower of Berlinia confusa

Scientific classification
- Kingdom: Plantae
- Clade: Embryophytes
- Clade: Tracheophytes
- Clade: Spermatophytes
- Clade: Angiosperms
- Clade: Eudicots
- Clade: Rosids
- Order: Fabales
- Family: Fabaceae
- Subfamily: Detarioideae
- Tribe: Amherstieae
- Genus: Berlinia; Sol. ex Hook.f. & Benth. (1849), nom. cons.

Species
- 21; see text

Synonyms
- Macroberlinia (Harms) Hauman (1952); Westia Vahl (1810), nom. rej.

= Berlinia =

Berlinia Temporal range: Ypresian–Recent

Genus of flowering plants

Berlinia is a genus of flowering plants in the family Fabaceae. It includes 21 species of trees native to sub-Saharan Africa, ranging from Guinea to Chad, Tanzania, Mozambique, and Angola. All species of Berlinia have "explosive" pods, casting the seeds, in the case of the recently discovered Berlinia korupensis, up to 50 metres (160 ft) away.

Species of Berlina grow in the Guineo–Congolian forest of equatorial western and central Africa, and in the transitional forest–savanna mosaic belts north and south of the forest region.

Fossil pollen attributable to the genus is known from the Eocene (Ypresian) of Africa.

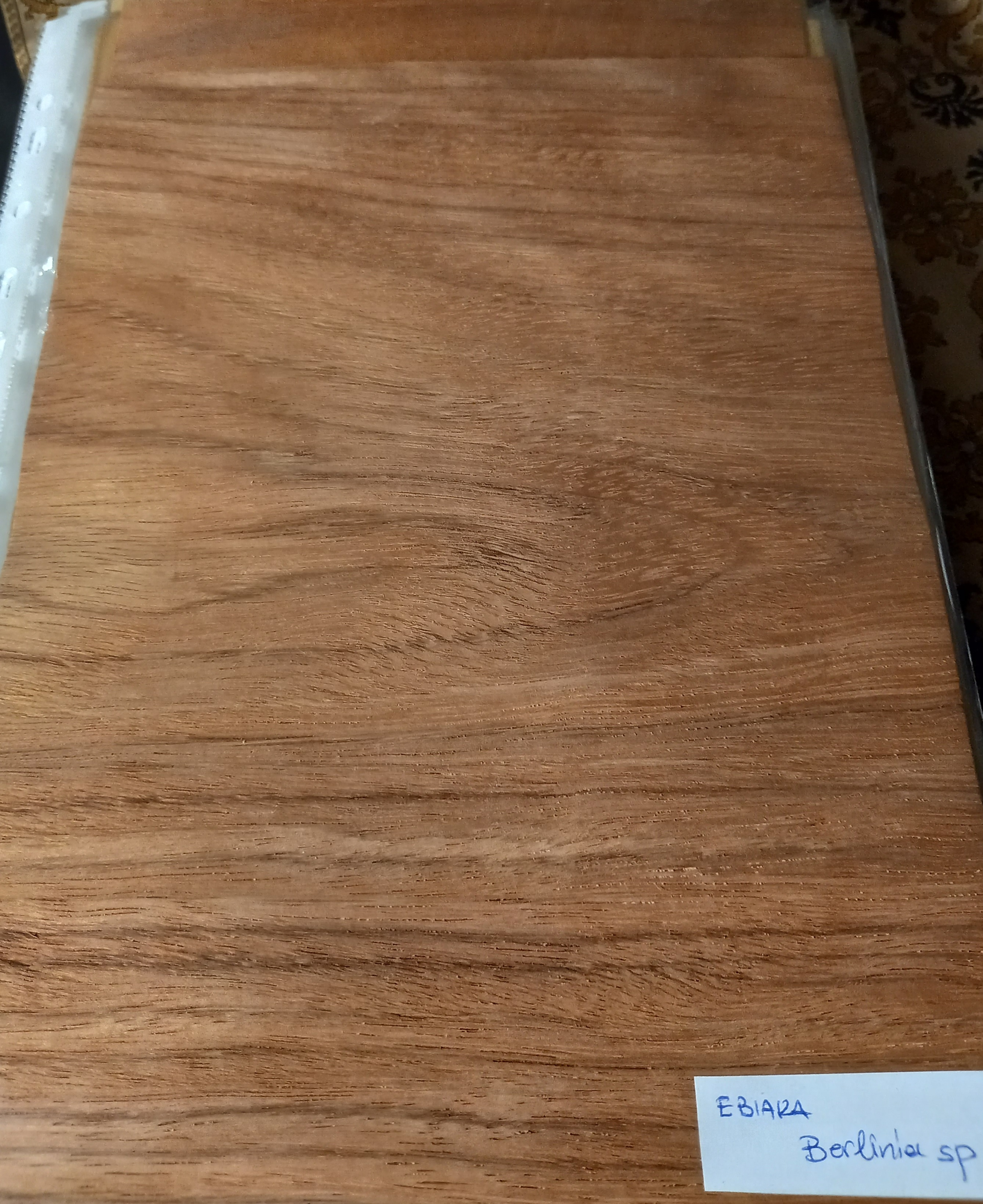
Ebiara veneer (Berlinia confusa)

== Species ==
21 species accepted by the Plants of the World Online as of August 2023:

- Berlinia auriculata Benth. – Benin to Central African Republic and Republic of the Congo
- Berlinia bracteosa Benth. – southern Nigeria to Chad and Democratic Republic of the Congo
- Berlinia bruneelii (De Wild.) Torre & Hillc. – Cameroon and Central African Republic to Democratic Republic of the Congo and Angola
- Berlinia confusa Hoyle – Sierra Leone to Cameroon and Republic of the Congo
- Berlinia congolensis (Baker f.) Keay – Nigeria to Democratic Republic of the Congo and Angola
- Berlinia coriacea Keay – Nigeria to Central African Republic
- Berlinia craibiana Baker f. – Nigeria to Central African Republic and northern Angola
- Berlinia delevoyi De Wild. – Democratic Republic of the Congo and northeastern Angola
- Berlinia giorgii De Wild. – Nigeria and Democratic Republic of the Congo, Angola, and Zambia
- Berlinia grandiflora (Vahl) Hutch. & Dalziel – Guinea to Niger, Central African Republic, and Angola
- Berlinia hollandii Hutch. & Dalziel – southern Nigeria and Cameroon
- Berlinia immaculata Mackinder & Wieringa – Cameroon and Gabon
- Berlinia korupensis Mackinder & Burgt – western Cameroon
- Berlinia occidentalis Keay – Sierra Leone to Ghana
- Berlinia orientalis Brenan – Tanzania and Mozambique
- Berlinia phenacoa Mackinder – Republic of the Congo and Democratic Republic of the Congo
- Berlinia rabiensis Mackinder – Gabon
- Berlinia razzifera Mackinder & Wieringa – Gabon
- Berlinia sapinii De Wild. – Democratic Republic of the Congo
- Berlinia tomentella Keay – Sierra Leone to Ghana and Cameroon
- Berlinia viridicans Baker f. – Gabon, Republic of the Congo, and Democratic Republic of the Congo

== Wood ==
Berlinia species produce a valuable timber, commercially known as Ebiara, whose veneers are highly appreciated for their aesthetic appeal and are widely used in furniture production and interior decorative applications.
