= Uvariodendron anisatum =

Conservation status
- Vulnerable (IUCN 3.1)

Scientific classification
- Kingdom: Plantae
- Clade: Tracheophytes
- Clade: Angiosperms
- Clade: Magnoliids
- Order: Magnoliales
- Family: Annonaceae
- Genus: Uvariodendron
- Species: U. anisatum

Binomial name
- Uvariodendron anisatum Verdc.

Species of flowering plant

Uvariodendron anisatum is a species of plant in the family Annonaceae. It is endemic to Kenya. It is threatened by habitat loss.
