= Berlinia hollandii =

Conservation status
- Critically endangered, possibly extinct (IUCN 3.1)

Scientific classification
- Kingdom: Plantae
- Clade: Tracheophytes
- Clade: Angiosperms
- Clade: Eudicots
- Clade: Rosids
- Order: Fabales
- Family: Fabaceae
- Genus: Berlinia
- Species: B. hollandii

Binomial name
- Berlinia hollandii Hutch. & Dalziel

Species of legume

Berlinia hollandii is a species of plant in the family Fabaceae. It is found only in Nigeria. It is threatened by habitat loss.
