= Lannea transulta =

Conservation status
- Near Threatened (IUCN 3.1)

Scientific classification
- Kingdom: Plantae
- Clade: Tracheophytes
- Clade: Angiosperms
- Clade: Eudicots
- Clade: Rosids
- Order: Sapindales
- Family: Anacardiaceae
- Genus: Lannea
- Species: L. transulta

Binomial name
- Lannea transulta (Balf.f.) Radcl.-Sm.

Synonyms
- Elaeocarpus transultus Balf.f.

Species of plant

Lannea transulta is a species of plant in the family Anacardiaceae. It is endemic to Yemen. Its natural habitats are subtropical or tropical dry forests and subtropical or tropical dry shrubland.
