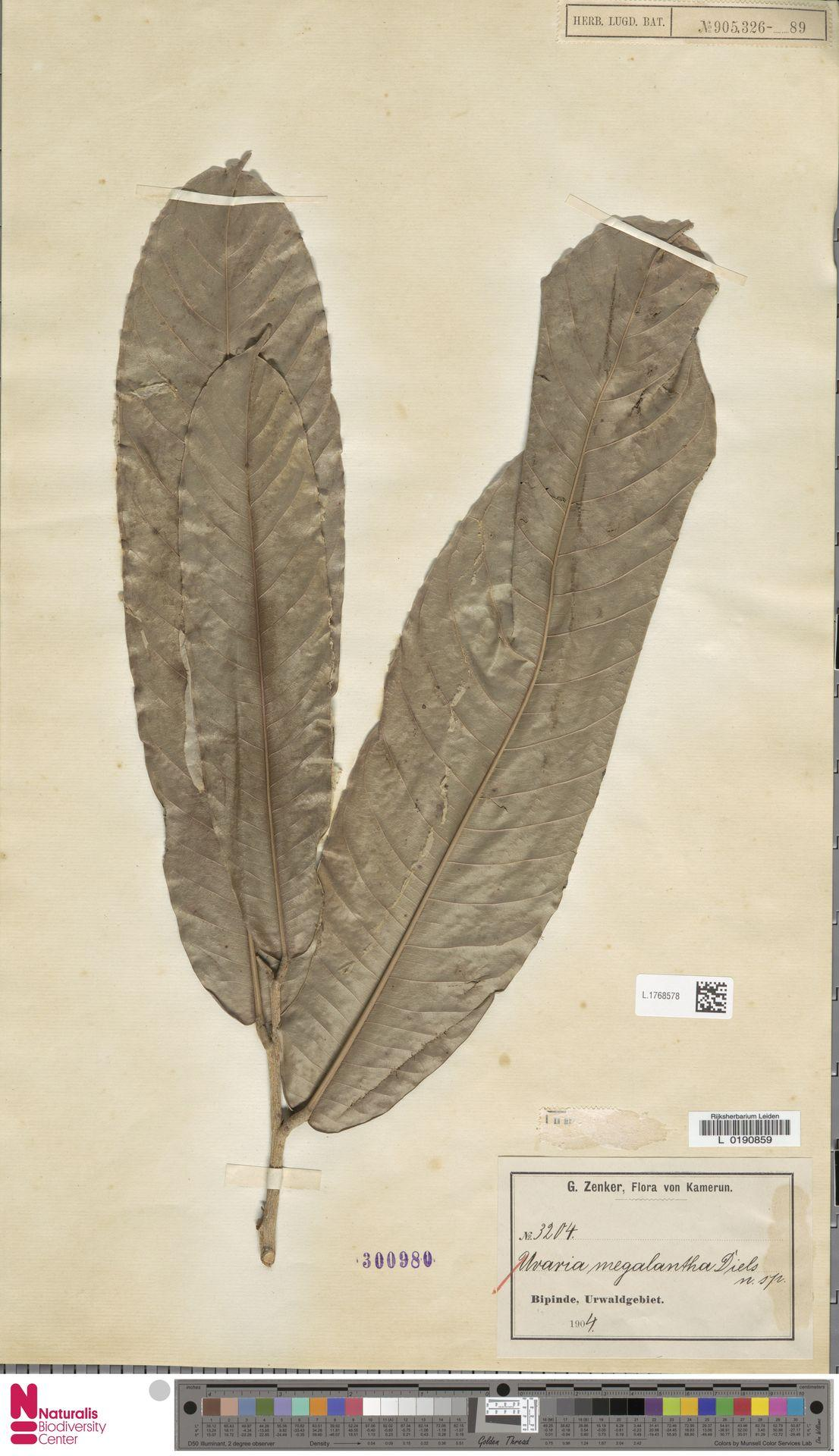

Conservation status
- Least Concern (IUCN 3.1)

Scientific classification
- Kingdom: Plantae
- Clade: Embryophytes
- Clade: Tracheophytes
- Clade: Spermatophytes
- Clade: Angiosperms
- Clade: Magnoliids
- Order: Magnoliales
- Family: Annonaceae
- Genus: Uvariodendron
- Species: U. connivens

Binomial name
- Uvariodendron connivens (Benth.) R.E.Fr.

Synonyms
- Uva connivens (Benth.) Kuntze; Uvaria connivens Benth.; Uvaria megalantha Diels; Uvaria winkleri Diels

= Uvariodendron connivens =

Species of flowering plant

Uvariodendron connivens is a species of flowering plant in the family Annonaceae. It is a tree native to Cameroon, Gabon, and southern Nigeria. It is threatened by habitat loss.
