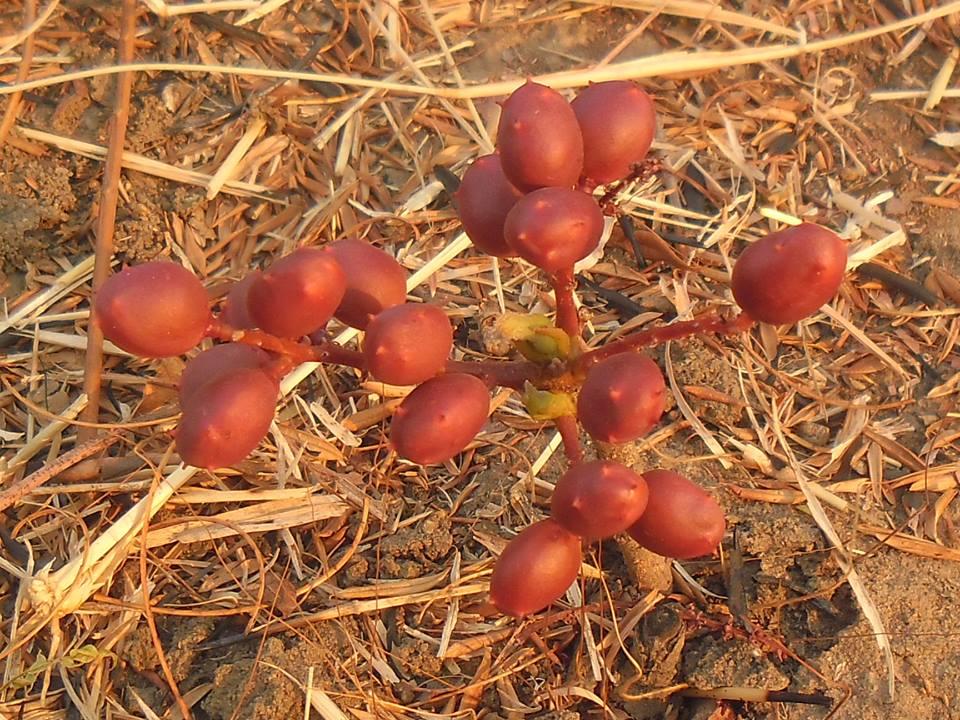

Scientific classification
- Kingdom: Plantae
- Clade: Tracheophytes
- Clade: Angiosperms
- Clade: Eudicots
- Clade: Rosids
- Order: Sapindales
- Family: Anacardiaceae
- Genus: Lannea
- Species: L. edulis

Binomial name
- Lannea edulis (Sond.) Engl.

Synonyms
- Calesiam edule (Sond.) Kuntze; Lannea edulis subsp. glabrescens (Engl.) Burtt Davy; Lannea edulis subsp. integrifolia Engl.; Lannea edulis var. edulis; Lannea glabrescens Engl.; Lannea nana Engl.; Odina edulis Sond.

= Lannea edulis =

Species of shrub

Lannea edulis is a small deciduous shrub that commonly occurs in East and Southern Africa, it belongs to the Anacardiaceae family.

== Description ==
It has leafy branches produced from underground rootstock (sub-shrub). Leaves are imparipinnately compound, with about 2-4 pairs of leaflets per pinnae; the leaf-blade is broadly ovate to oblong with a shiny and coriaceous surface, measuring about 9-20 cm long and 9-12 cm wide. Flowers are small, yellowish to cream colored and are produced on spikes or panicles near the ground, typically appearing before the leaves. The fruit is a berry that turns scarlet-purple when ripe.

== Distribution ==
The species is endemic to parts of Angola, can also be found in East African countries like Tanzania and in Southern African.

== Uses ==
Root extracts are used in traditional medical practices by various communities; in Zambia it is used to treat problems associated with schistosomiasis, gonorrhea and diarrhea, in parts of South Africa, it is used to treat angina pectoris.

Fruit is edible and eaten by locals.
