= Uvariodendron fuscum var. giganteum =

Conservation status
- Vulnerable (IUCN 3.1)

Scientific classification
- Kingdom: Plantae
- Clade: Tracheophytes
- Clade: Angiosperms
- Clade: Magnoliids
- Order: Magnoliales
- Family: Annonaceae
- Genus: Uvariodendron
- Species: U. fuscum
- Variety: U. f. var. giganteum

Trinomial name
- Uvariodendron fuscum var. giganteum (Engl.) Dagallier & Couvreur

Synonyms
- Uva gigantea (Engl.) Kuntze; Uvaria gigantea Engl.; Uvariodendron giganteum (Engl.) R.E.Fr.

Species of flowering plant

Uvariodendron fuscum var. giganteum is a variety of flowering plant in the family Annonaceae. It is a tree native to southern Nigeria, Cameroon, Gabon, and the Democratic Republic of the Congo. It is a forest tree which grows up to 30 ft. tall. Flowers yellow and purple within. Its natural habitat is subtropical or tropical moist lowland forests. It is threatened by habitat loss.
