= Gilbertiodendron diphyllum =

Conservation status
- Near Threatened (IUCN 2.3)

Scientific classification
- Kingdom: Plantae
- Clade: Tracheophytes
- Clade: Angiosperms
- Clade: Eudicots
- Clade: Rosids
- Order: Fabales
- Family: Fabaceae
- Genus: Gilbertiodendron
- Species: G. diphyllum

Binomial name
- Gilbertiodendron diphyllum (Harms) Estrella & Devesa

Synonyms
- Macrolobium diphyllum Harms; Macrolobium reticulatum Hutch.; Pellegriniodendron diphyllum (Harms) J.Léonard

Species of legume

Pellegriniodendron diphyllum is a species of plant in the family Fabaceae. It is found in Cameroon, Côte d'Ivoire, Gabon, and Ghana. It is threatened by habitat loss.
