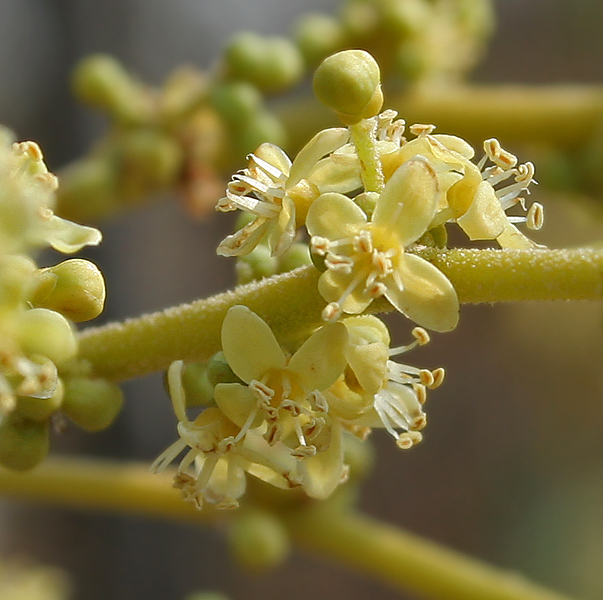
- L. coromandelica flowers in Hyderabad, India.

Scientific classification
- Kingdom: Plantae
- Clade: Tracheophytes
- Clade: Angiosperms
- Clade: Eudicots
- Clade: Rosids
- Order: Sapindales
- Family: Anacardiaceae
- Genus: Lannea
- Species: L. coromandelica

Binomial name
- Lannea coromandelica (Houtt.) Merr.

Synonyms
- List: Calsiama malabarica Raf.; Dialium coromandelinum Houtt.; Haberlia grandis Dennst.; Lannea grandis (Dennst.) Engl.; Lannea wodier (Roxb.) Adelb.; Odina gummifera Blume; Odina pinnata Rottler; Odina wodier Roxb.; Rhus odina Buch.-Ham. ex Wall.; Spondias oghigee G.Don; Spondias wirtgenii Hassk.; Tapirira wodier (Roxb.) Marchand; Wirtgenia octandra Jungh.

= Lannea coromandelica =

Species of plant in the genus Lannea

Lannea coromandelica, also known as the Indian ash tree, is a species of tree in the family Anacardiaceae that grows in South and Southeast Asia, ranging from Sri Lanka to Southern China. Known also as the Mohin tree (Hindi: मोहिन) it is used in plywoods for its excellent termite resistance properties. It commonly grows in exposed dry woodland environments, where the tree is up to 10 meters tall and crooked. In more humid environments it is a larger spreading tree that can become 20 meters tall. In Sri Lanka Lannea coromandelica often grows on rock outcrops or inselbergs. In Nepal, commonly known as "Jhingat", it is grown in agroforestry as a multi-purpose tree, for both timber, but it can also be lopped 3 times a year to provide fodder.
