= Gilbertiodendron splendidum =

Conservation status
- Vulnerable (IUCN 2.3)

Scientific classification
- Kingdom: Plantae
- Clade: Tracheophytes
- Clade: Angiosperms
- Clade: Eudicots
- Clade: Rosids
- Order: Fabales
- Family: Fabaceae
- Genus: Gilbertiodendron
- Species: G. splendidum

Binomial name
- Gilbertiodendron splendidum (A.Chev. ex Hutch. & Dalziel) J.Leonard

Synonyms
- Berlinia splendida A.Chev. ex Hutch. & Dalziel; Macrolobium splendidum (A.Chev. ex Hutch. & Dalziel) Pellegr.

Species of legume

Gilbertiodendron splendidum is a tall forest tree of lowland swamp forests of coastal West Africa in the family Fabaceae. It is found in Upper Guinean forests along coastal regions of Côte d'Ivoire, Ghana, and Sierra Leone. It is threatened by habitat loss.
