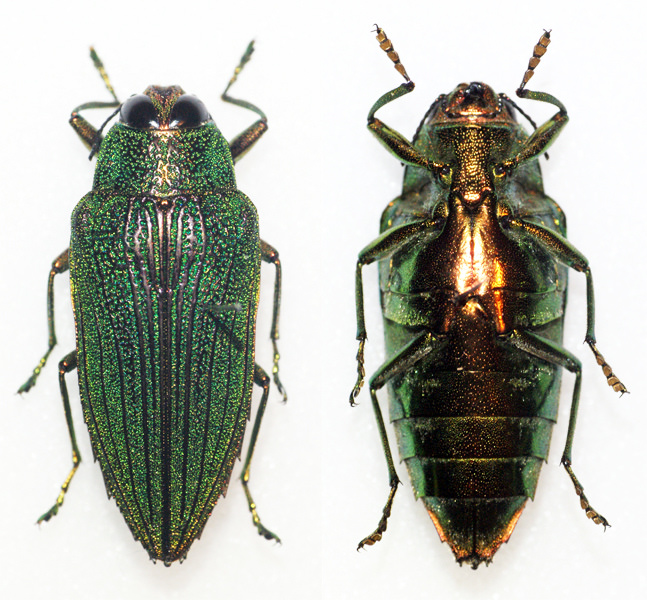
- Evides triangularis

Scientific classification
- Kingdom: Animalia
- Phylum: Arthropoda
- Class: Insecta
- Order: Coleoptera
- Suborder: Polyphaga
- Infraorder: Elateriformia
- Family: Buprestidae
- Genus: Evides; Dejean, 1833

= Evides =

Genus of beetles

Evides is a genus of beetles in the family Buprestidae, containing the following species:

- Evides aenea Kerremans, 1898
- Evides elegans (Fabricius, 1781)
- Evides fairmairei Kerremans, 1908
- Evides gambiensis (Laporte & Gory, 1835)
- Evides intermedia Saunders, 1874
- Evides interstitialis Obenberger, 1924
- Evides kerremansi Fairmaire, 1891
- Evides kraatzi Kerremans, 1899
- Evides opaca (Lansbarge, 1886)
- Evides pubiventris (Laporte & Gory, 1835)
- Evides triangularis Thomson, 1878
