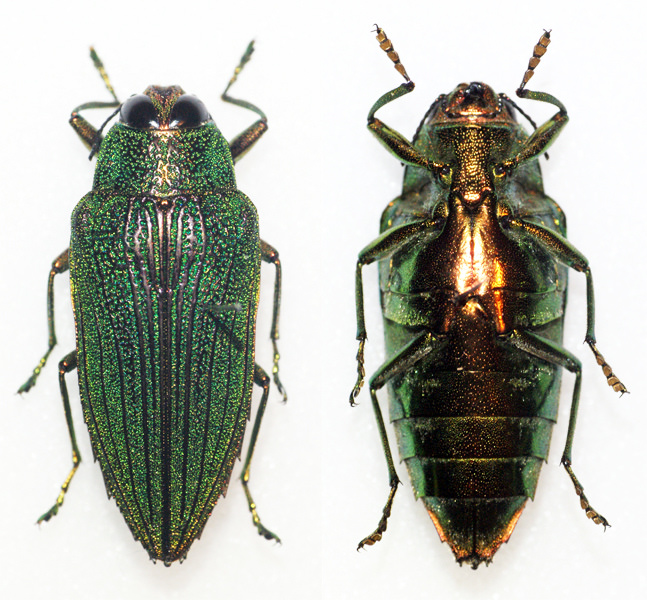

Scientific classification
- Kingdom: Animalia
- Phylum: Arthropoda
- Class: Insecta
- Order: Coleoptera
- Suborder: Polyphaga
- Infraorder: Elateriformia
- Family: Buprestidae
- Genus: Evides
- Species: E. triangularis

Binomial name
- Evides triangularis Thomson, 1878

= Evides triangularis =

Species of beetles

Evides triangularis is a South African wood-boring jewel beetle species in the family of Buprestidae. It has a metallic green coloration that is not reflective in the near-infrared renge of the spectrum.
