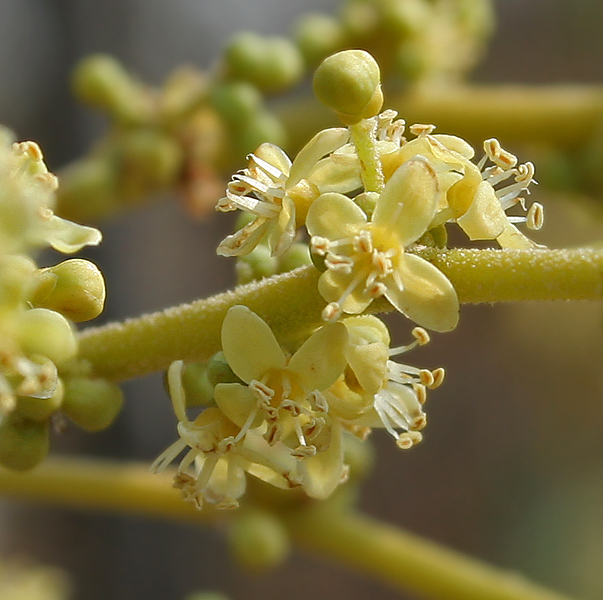
- L. coromandelica flowers in Hyderabad, India.

Scientific classification
- Kingdom: Plantae
- Clade: Tracheophytes
- Clade: Angiosperms
- Clade: Eudicots
- Clade: Rosids
- Order: Sapindales
- Family: Anacardiaceae
- Subfamily: Spondiadoideae
- Genus: Lannea; A. Rich. in Guillem.

Synonyms
- Calesiam Adans. (1763); Lanneoma Del. (1843); Odina Roxb. (1832); Scassellatia Chiov. (1932)

= Lannea =

Genus of flowering plants

Lannea is a genus of plants in the family Anacardiaceae.

== Taxonomy ==
=== Species ===
As of July 2020, Plants of the World online has 36 accepted species:

- Lannea acida A.Rich.
- Lannea acuminata Engl.
- Lannea alata (Engl.) Engl.
- Lannea ambacensis (Hiern) Engl.
- Lannea angolensis R.Fern. & Mendes
- Lannea antiscorbutica (Hiern) Engl.
- Lannea asymmetrica R.E.Fr.
- Lannea barteri (Oliv.) Engl.
- Lannea chevalieri Engl.
- Lannea cinerascens Engl.
- Lannea coromandelica (Houtt.) Merr.
- Lannea cotoneaster (Chiov.) Sacleux
- Lannea discolor (Sond.) Engl.
- Lannea edulis (Sond.) Engl.
- Lannea fruticosa (Hochst. ex A. Rich.) Engl.
- Lannea fulva (Engl.) Engl.
- Lannea glabrescens Engl.
- Lannea gossweileri Exell & Mendonça
- Lannea humilis (Oliv.) Engl.
- Lannea katangensis Van der Veken
- Lannea ledermannii Engl.
- Lannea malifolia (Chiov.) Sacleux
- Lannea microcarpa Engl. & K.Krause
- Lannea nigritana (Scott Elliot) Keay
- Lannea obovata (Hook.f. ex Oliv.) Engl.
- Lannea rivae (Chiov.) Sacleux
- Lannea rubra (Hiern) Engl.
- Lannea schimperi (Hochst. ex A.Rich.) Engl.
- Lannea schweinfurthii (Engl.) Engl.
- Lannea tibatensis Engl.
- Lannea transulta (Balf.f.) Radcl.-Sm.
- Lannea triphylla (Hochst. ex A.Rich.) Engl.
- Lannea velutina A.Rich.
- Lannea virgata R.Fern. & A.Fern.
- Lannea welwitschii (Hiern) Engl.
- Lannea zastrowiana Engl. & Brehmer

Possible synonyms of other species:

- Lannea transulta (Balf.f.) Radcl.-Sm.
- Lannea triphylla (syn. L. somalensis & L. cinerea)
