= Gilbertiodendron newberyi =

Conservation status
- Endangered (IUCN 3.1)

Scientific classification
- Kingdom: Plantae
- Clade: Tracheophytes
- Clade: Angiosperms
- Clade: Eudicots
- Clade: Rosids
- Order: Fabales
- Family: Fabaceae
- Genus: Gilbertiodendron
- Species: G. newberyi

Binomial name
- Gilbertiodendron newberyi Burgt

Species of legume

Gilbertiodendron newberyi is a rainforest tree endemic to to Korup National Park in Cameroon. It belongs to the subfamily Caesalpinioideae of the family Fabaceae. It grows up to 51 metres (167 ft) in height with a diameter at breast height (DBH) of up to 197 cm (6 ft 6 in). The species usually grows in stands or groups. As with all species of Gilbertiodendron, the seed pods disperse their seeds explosively, ejecting the seeds up to 50–70 metres range from the parent tree. It is closely similar to Gilbertiodendron ogoouense from the same area, but differs in leaves on fertile branches having a rachis up to 20 cm long and with 3–5 pairs of leaflets, rather than the 10 cm rachis with 1–3 pairs of leaflets of G. ogoouense; it also has fewer longitudinal ridges on the seed pods, and grey-brown bark (yellowish brown in G. ogoouense). The two species form clustered groups in different parts of Korup.
