= Berlinia coriacea =

Conservation status
- Least Concern (IUCN 3.1)

Scientific classification
- Kingdom: Plantae
- Clade: Tracheophytes
- Clade: Angiosperms
- Clade: Eudicots
- Clade: Rosids
- Order: Fabales
- Family: Fabaceae
- Genus: Berlinia
- Species: B. coriacea

Binomial name
- Berlinia coriacea Keay

Species of legume

Berlinia coriacea is a species of plant in the family Fabaceae. It was previously thought to occur only in Nigeria, but recent collections have been made in Gabon and Cameroon. It is threatened by habitat loss.
