= Uvariodendron occidentale =

Conservation status
- Vulnerable (IUCN 2.3)

Scientific classification
- Kingdom: Plantae
- Clade: Embryophytes
- Clade: Tracheophytes
- Clade: Spermatophytes
- Clade: Angiosperms
- Clade: Magnoliids
- Order: Magnoliales
- Family: Annonaceae
- Genus: Uvariodendron
- Species: U. occidentale

Binomial name
- Uvariodendron occidentale Le Thomas

Species of flowering plant

Uvariodendron occidentale is a species of plant in the family Annonaceae. It is found in Cameroon, Ivory Coast, Ghana, Liberia, and Nigeria. It is threatened by habitat loss.
