= Gilbertiodendron klainei =

Conservation status
- Vulnerable (IUCN 3.1)

Scientific classification
- Kingdom: Plantae
- Clade: Tracheophytes
- Clade: Angiosperms
- Clade: Eudicots
- Clade: Rosids
- Order: Fabales
- Family: Fabaceae
- Genus: Gilbertiodendron
- Species: G. klainei

Binomial name
- Gilbertiodendron klainei (Pierre ex Pellegrin) Leonard

Species of legume

Gilbertiodendron klainei is a species of plant in the family Fabaceae. It is found only in Gabon.
