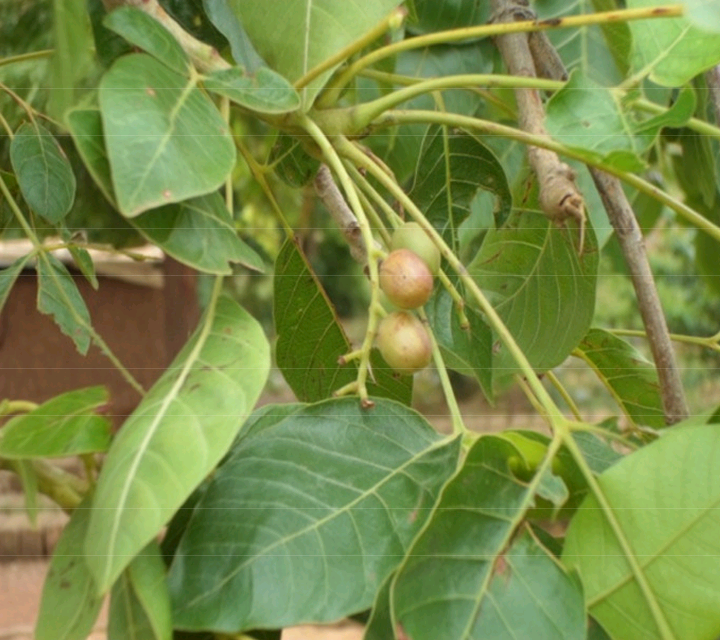

Scientific classification
- Kingdom: Plantae
- Clade: Tracheophytes
- Clade: Angiosperms
- Clade: Eudicots
- Clade: Rosids
- Order: Sapindales
- Family: Anacardiaceae
- Genus: Lannea
- Species: L. acida

Binomial name
- Lannea acida A.Rich.

= Lannea acida =

Species of plant

Lannea acida is a shrub or small deciduous tree within the family Anacardiaceae. It is endemic to the Guinea and Sudan savannas of West and Central Africa.

== Description ==
A small tree, it is capable of growing up to 12 meters tall, it has a brown-black colored scaly bark, with red and yellow fibrous slash. Leaves are alternate and imparipinnate and with red rachis when young; leaflets are glabrous, leaf-blade is narrowly ovate, 4-12 cm long and 1.5-5 cm wide and with an acute to acuminate apex and a cuneate base. Fruits is an ellipsoid drupe, yellowish to red colored when ripe, fruiting usually begins at the end of the dry season or at the beginning of the rainy season and last a couple of months, the plant is usually leafless during the fruiting period.

== Distribution ==
The species occurs in the Guinea and Sudan savannahs of West and Central Africa, it is also found around the edges of rainwater forests.

== Chemistry ==
Test on the bark extracts of the plant indicated the presence of flavanoids, such as 7-methyltectorigenin, 6,7-(2”,2”-dimethyl chromeno)-8-γ,γ-dimethyl allyl flavanone and Irisolidine.

== Uses ==
Parts of Lannea acida are consumed as food, used in dyeing methods and also in traditional medical practices. In traditional medical practices, it serves as a multipurpose species, whereby parts are used to treat symptoms associated with stomach pains, diarrhea and rheumatism. Ripe fruits are edible and consumed by many local communities.
