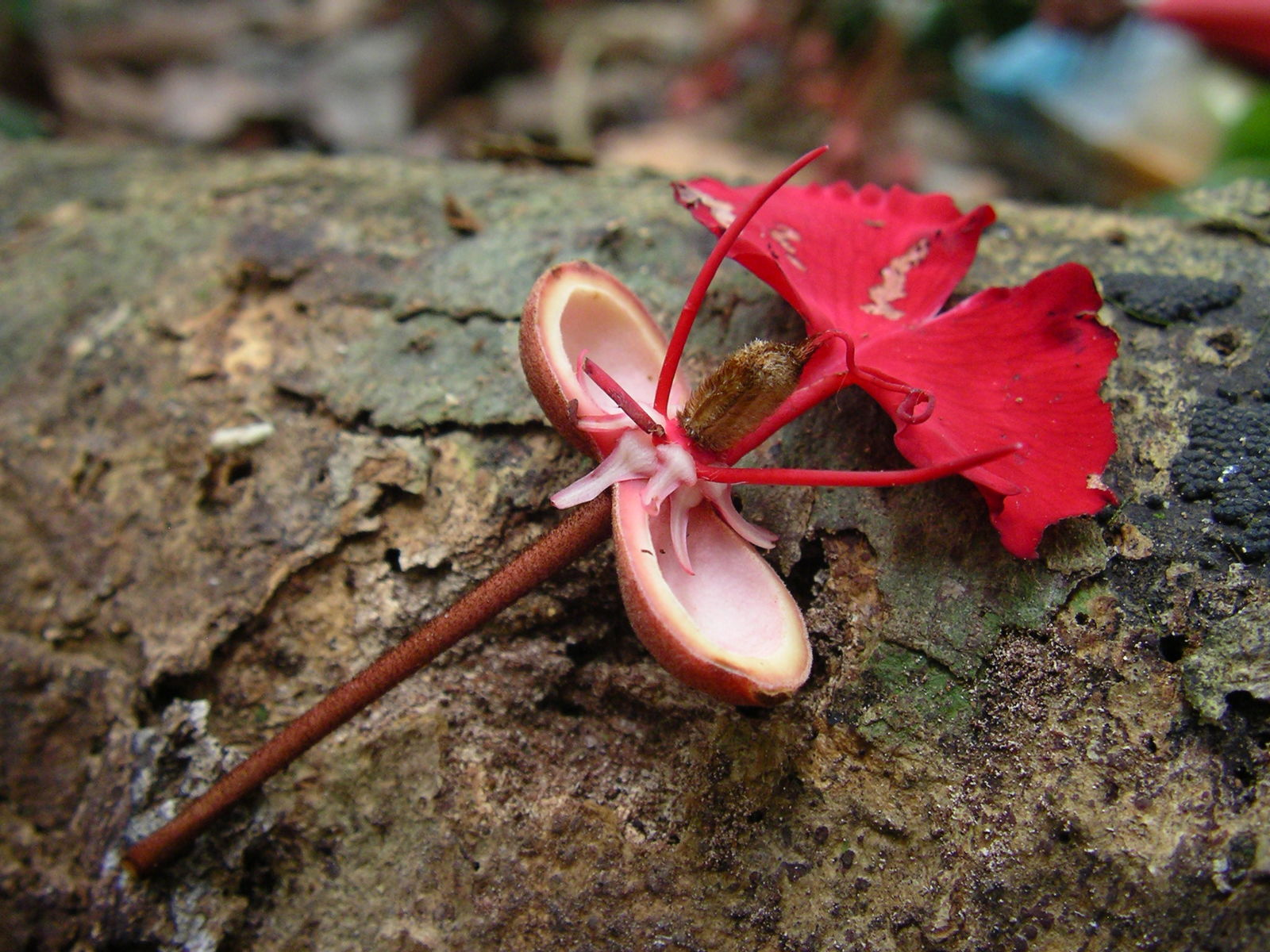
- Flower of Gilbertiodendron dewevrei in Cameroon

Scientific classification
- Kingdom: Plantae
- Clade: Tracheophytes
- Clade: Angiosperms
- Clade: Eudicots
- Clade: Rosids
- Order: Fabales
- Family: Fabaceae
- Subfamily: Detarioideae
- Tribe: Amherstieae
- Genus: Gilbertiodendron; J.Léonard (1952)

Type species
- Gilbertiodendron demonstrans (Baill.) J.Léonard (1952)

Species
- See text

Synonyms
- Pellegriniodendron (Harms) J. Léonard (1955)

= Gilbertiodendron =

Genus of legumes

Gilbertiodendron is a genus of legumes in the family Fabaceae. It consists of about 35–40 species of tree, native to west and west-central tropical Africa. Members of this genus were formerly considered to be in the genus Macrolobium but that genus is now restricted to species growing in tropical America. The genus Pellegriniodendron is now included within Gilbertiodendron.

In all species of Gilbertiodendron, the seed pods disperse their seeds explosively, ejecting the seeds up to 50–70 metres range from the parent tree.

== Species ==
Gilbertiodendron includes 38 accepted species:

- Gilbertiodendron aylmeri (Hutch. & Dalziel) J.Léonard
- Gilbertiodendron bambolense Burgt
- Gilbertiodendron barbulatum (Pellegr.) J.Léonard
- Gilbertiodendron bilineatum (Hutch. & Dalziel) J.Léonard
- Gilbertiodendron brachystegioides (Harms) J.Léonard
- Gilbertiodendron breteleri Burgt
- Gilbertiodendron breynei Bamps
- Gilbertiodendron demonstrans (Baill.) J.Léonard
- Gilbertiodendron dewevrei (De Wild.) J.Léonard
- Gilbertiodendron diphyllum (Harms) Estrella & Devesa
- Gilbertiodendron ebo Burgt & Mackinder
- Gilbertiodendron ecoukense (Pellegr.) Burgt
- Gilbertiodendron grandiflorum (De Wild.) J.Léonard
- Gilbertiodendron grandistipulatum (De Wild.) J.Léonard
- Gilbertiodendron imenoense (Pellegr.) J.Léonard
- Gilbertiodendron ivorense (A.Chev.) J.Léonard
- Gilbertiodendron jongkindii Estrella & Devesa
- Gilbertiodendron klainei (Pierre ex Pellegr.) J.Léonard
- Gilbertiodendron limba (Scott Elliot) J.Léonard
- Gilbertiodendron limosum (Pellegr.) J.Léonard
- Gilbertiodendron maximum Burgt & Wieringa
- Gilbertiodendron mayombense (Pellegr.) J.Léonard
- Gilbertiodendron minkebense Burgt & Estrella
- Gilbertiodendron newberyi Burgt
- Gilbertiodendron ngouniense (Pellegr.) J.Léonard
- Gilbertiodendron obliquum (Stapf) J.Léonard
- Gilbertiodendron ogoouense (Pellegr.) J.Léonard
- Gilbertiodendron pachyanthum (Harms) J.Léonard
- Gilbertiodendron preussii (Harms) J.Léonard
- Gilbertiodendron quinquejugum Burgt
- Gilbertiodendron robynsianum Aubrév. & Pellegr.
- Gilbertiodendron scutatum Wieringa & Estrella
- Gilbertiodendron splendidum (A.Chev. ex Hutch. & Dalziel) J.Léonard
- Gilbertiodendron stipulaceum (Benth.) J.Léonard
- Gilbertiodendron sulfureum Burgt
- Gilbertiodendron tonkolili Burgt & Estrella
- Gilbertiodendron unijugum (Pellegr.) J.Léonard
- Gilbertiodendron zenkeri (Harms) J.Léonard
