= Gilbertiodendron bilineatum =

Conservation status
- Vulnerable (IUCN 2.3)

Scientific classification
- Kingdom: Plantae
- Clade: Embryophytes
- Clade: Tracheophytes
- Clade: Spermatophytes
- Clade: Angiosperms
- Clade: Eudicots
- Clade: Rosids
- Order: Fabales
- Family: Fabaceae
- Genus: Gilbertiodendron
- Species: G. bilineatum

Binomial name
- Gilbertiodendron bilineatum (Hutch. & Dalziel) J.Léonard

Synonyms
- Macrolobium bilineatum Hutch. & Dalziel

Species of legume

Gilbertiodendron bilineatum is a species of plant in the family Fabaceae. It is found in Ivory Coast, Ghana, Liberia, and Sierra Leone. It is threatened by habitat loss.
