= Uvariodendron kirkii =

Conservation status
- Vulnerable (IUCN 3.1)

Scientific classification
- Kingdom: Plantae
- Clade: Embryophytes
- Clade: Tracheophytes
- Clade: Spermatophytes
- Clade: Angiosperms
- Clade: Magnoliids
- Order: Magnoliales
- Family: Annonaceae
- Genus: Uvariodendron
- Species: U. kirkii

Binomial name
- Uvariodendron kirkii Verdc.

Species of flowering plant

Uvariodendron kirkii is a species of flowering plant in the family Annonaceae. It is found in Kenya and Tanzania.
