= Scottellia klaineana =

Scientific classification
- Kingdom: Plantae
- Clade: Tracheophytes
- Clade: Angiosperms
- Clade: Eudicots
- Clade: Rosids
- Order: Malpighiales
- Family: Achariaceae
- Genus: Scottellia
- Species: S. klaineana

Binomial name
- Scottellia klaineana Pierre

Synonyms
- Scottellia gossweileri Exell

Species of tree

Scottellia klaineana is a species of tree native to West and Central Africa. It usually grows to a height of about 20 m (66 ft) but can grow taller. It has a straight, cylindrical trunk up to 70 cm (28 in) in diameter, and may have flutings or buttresses at the base. The timber is used for construction, panelling, joinery, furniture-making, cabinet work, carpentry, flooring, stairs, turnery and veneers.
