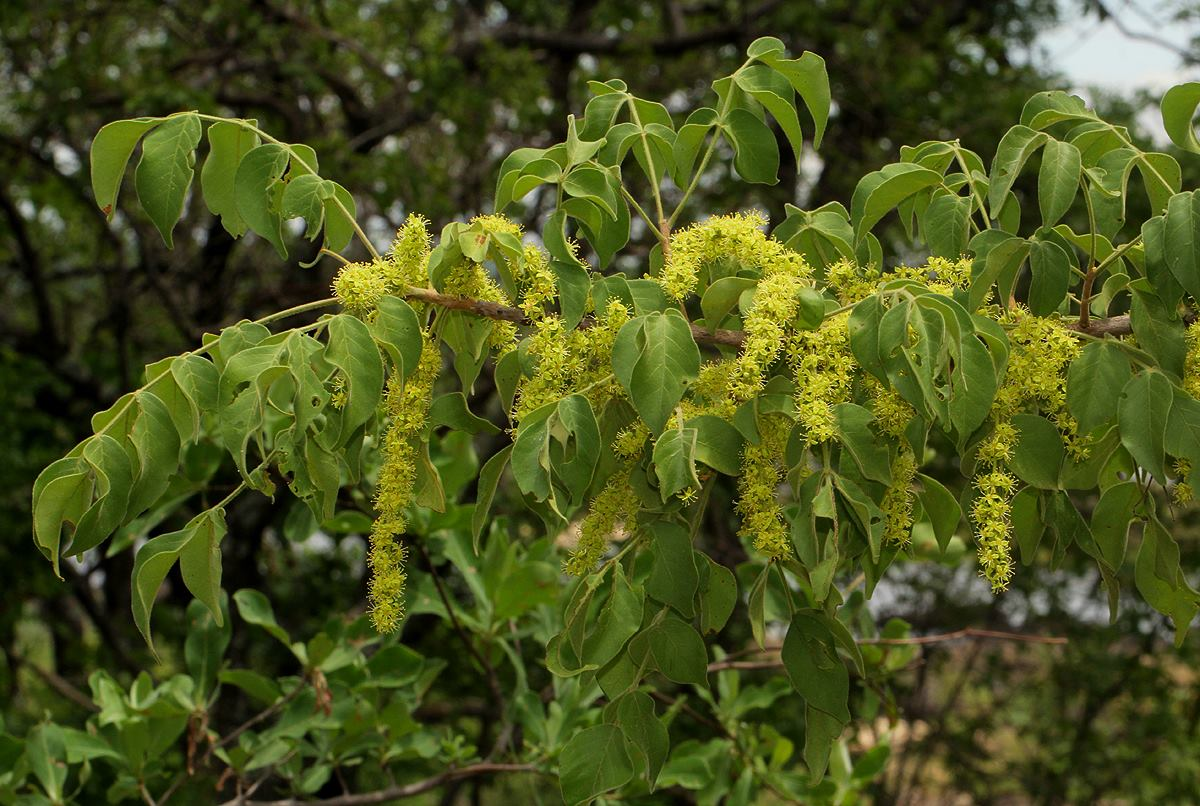

Scientific classification
- Kingdom: Plantae
- Clade: Embryophytes
- Clade: Tracheophytes
- Clade: Spermatophytes
- Clade: Angiosperms
- Clade: Eudicots
- Clade: Rosids
- Order: Sapindales
- Family: Anacardiaceae
- Genus: Lannea
- Species: L. schweinfurthii

Binomial name
- Lannea schweinfurthii (Engl.) Engl.

Synonyms
- Calesiam schweinfurthii (Engl.) Kuntze; Odina schweinfurthii Engl.

= Lannea schweinfurthii =

Species of deciduous tree

Lannea schweinfurthii is a small to medium-sized deciduous tree within the Anacardiaceae family. The tree is sometimes called 'bastard marula' or 'false marula' because when it is without flowers or fruits, it become quite similar to the marula tree and sometimes it's confused for the marula tree. Extracts of the species is used in traditional human and veterinary medical practices.

It has three varieties that are recognized by their leaf-blade outline and hairiness of leaves.

== Description ==
The species is capable of growing up to 22 m in height, but the common range is between 3-15m. It has an open or spreading crown with drooping branches bearing foliage at its end, bark is usually flaky and grey to brownish in color, but young stems tending to be pubescent become flaky when mature. Leaves are imparipinnately compound, with about 1-5 pairs of leaflets; leaf-blade is broadly ovate to elliptic in outline. Inflorescence is spike-like racemes; flowers are greenish yellow to yellow colored, fruit is an ellipsoid berry, which grows up to 12 mm long and is red-brown when ripe.

== Distribution ==
The species occurs in a wide range of environments in East Tropical Africa, but is also found in parts of North East Africa and Southern Africa. It has been reported in Somalia, Kenya and southwards towards South Africa.

== Chemistry ==
Chemical compounds isolated from the stem and root bark of the species include flavanoids: epicatechin gallate, catechin, and rutin; triterpenoids: b-sitosterol, sitosterol, sitosterol glucoside, lupeol, and lupenone, and alkyl cardonols: cyclohexenones and cyclohexenols.

== Uses ==
The root and stem bark is commonly used to treat a variety of ailments including blood disorders like Anemia, gastro-intestinal disorders such as diarrhea, dysentery, and stomach pains, sores and wounds and to treat infections such as abscesses, boils, skin rashes and gonorrhea. In Tanzania and Zimbabwe it is also used to treat animal related health issues such as coccidiosis and corridor disease.
