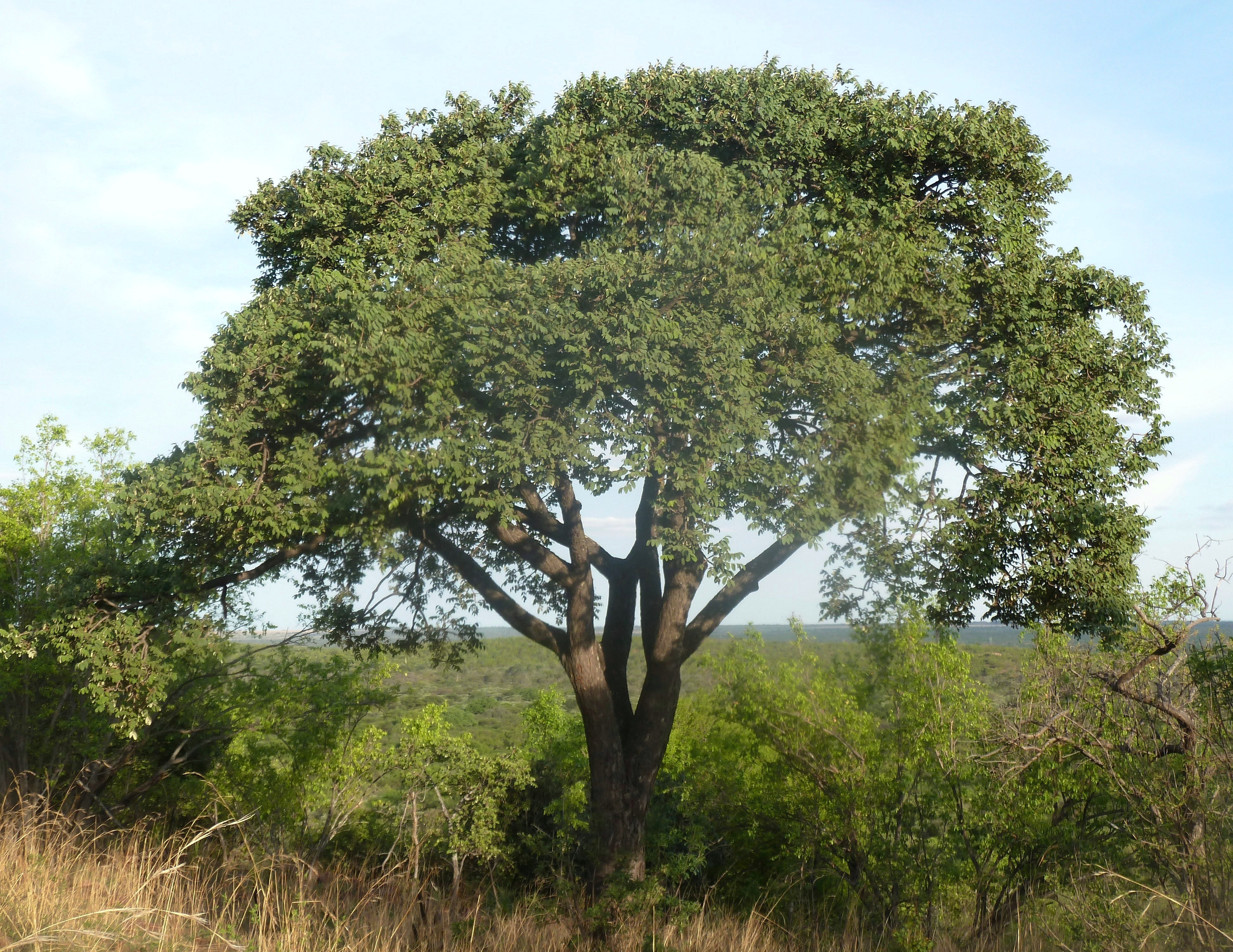
- In South Africa

Scientific classification
- Kingdom: Plantae
- Clade: Tracheophytes
- Clade: Angiosperms
- Clade: Eudicots
- Clade: Rosids
- Order: Sapindales
- Family: Anacardiaceae
- Genus: Lannea
- Species: L. discolor

Binomial name
- Lannea discolor (Sond.) Engl.

Synonyms
- Odina discolor Sond.

= Lannea discolor =

Live-long

Species of flowering plant

Lannea discolor, the live-long, is a plant species in the family Anacardiaceae. It is found from the DRC to Zambia, Zimbabwe, South Africa and Eswatini. It is similar in appearance to L. schweinfurthii which has a largely overlapping distribution.

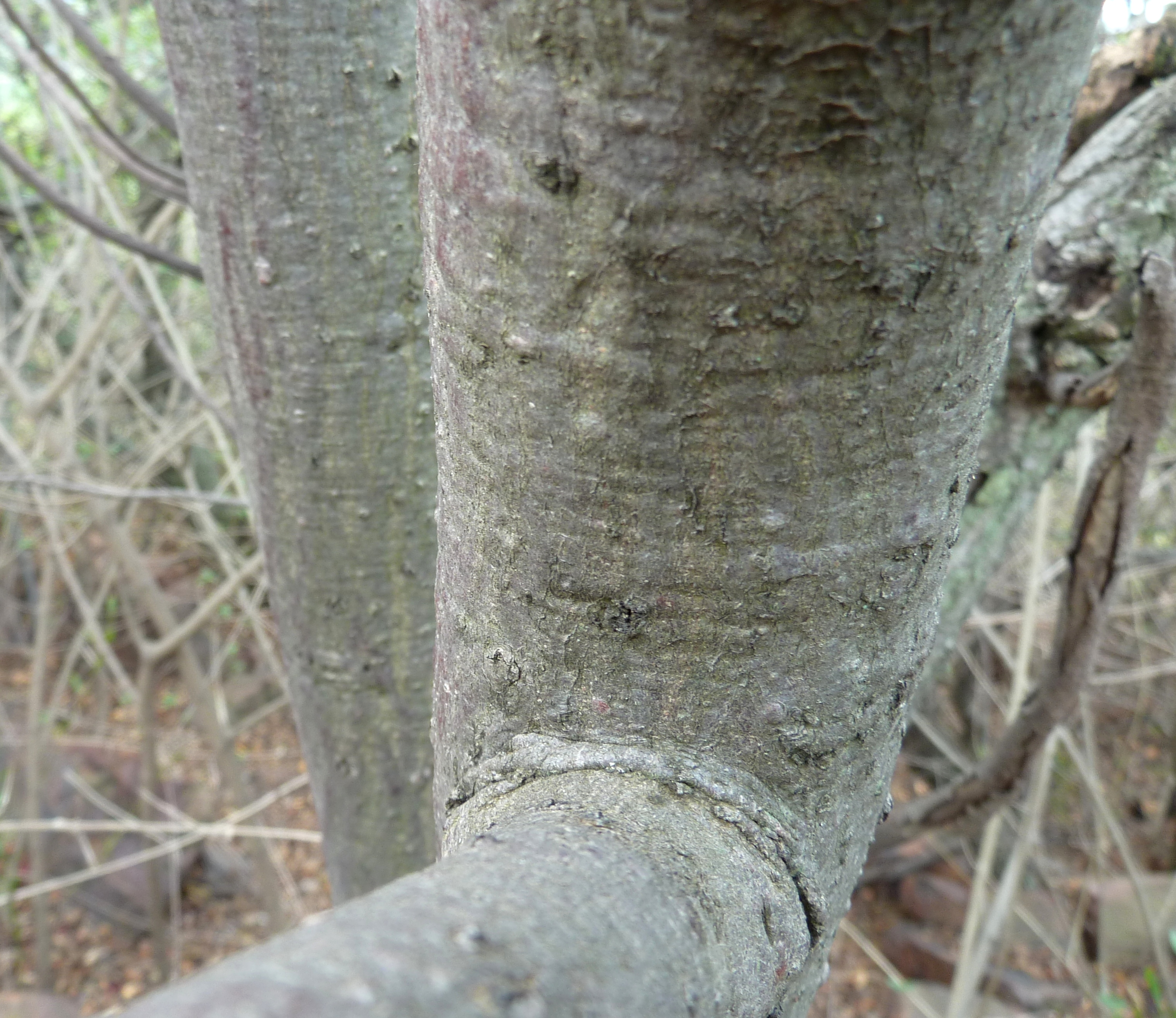
Bark

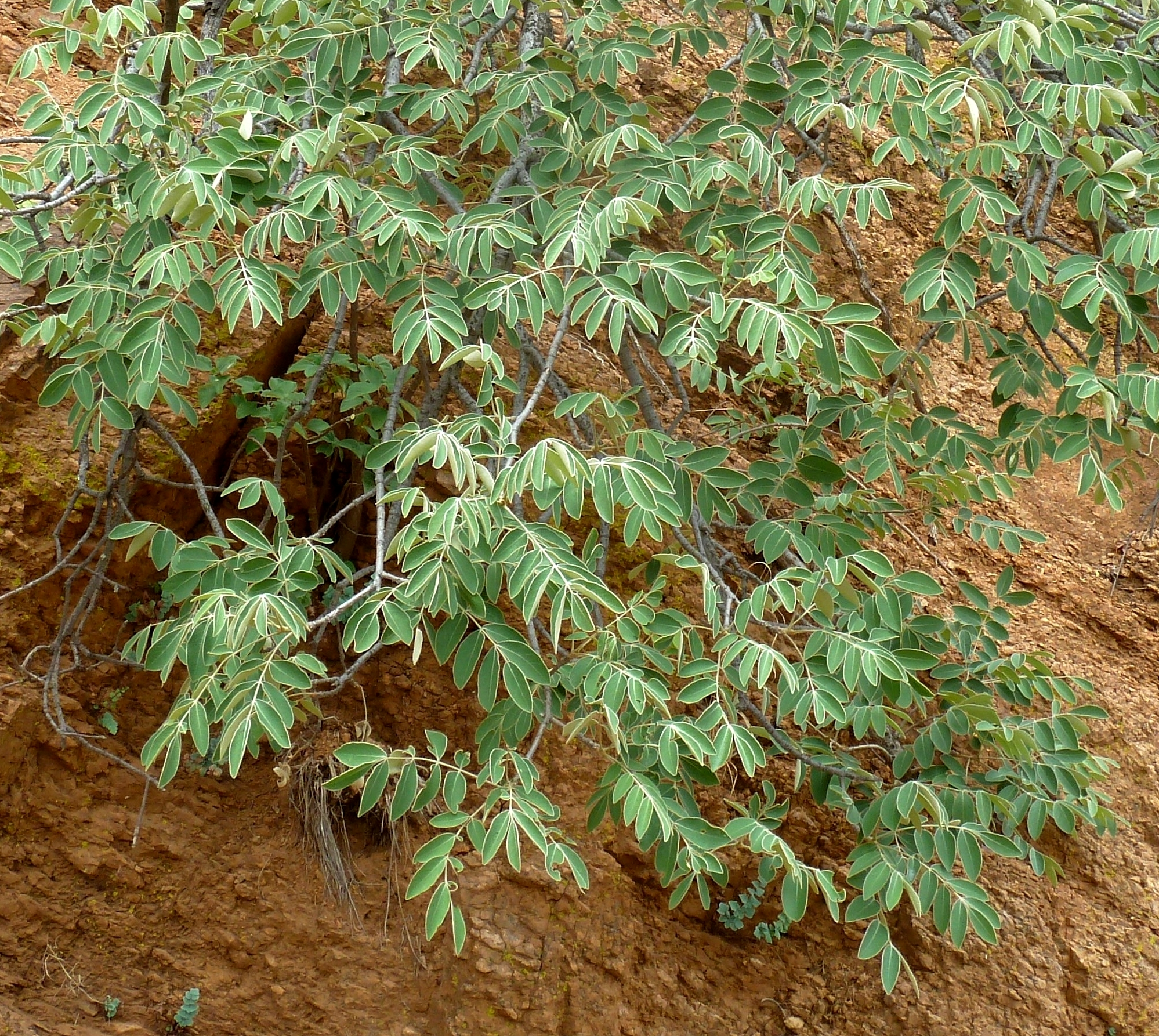
Foliage

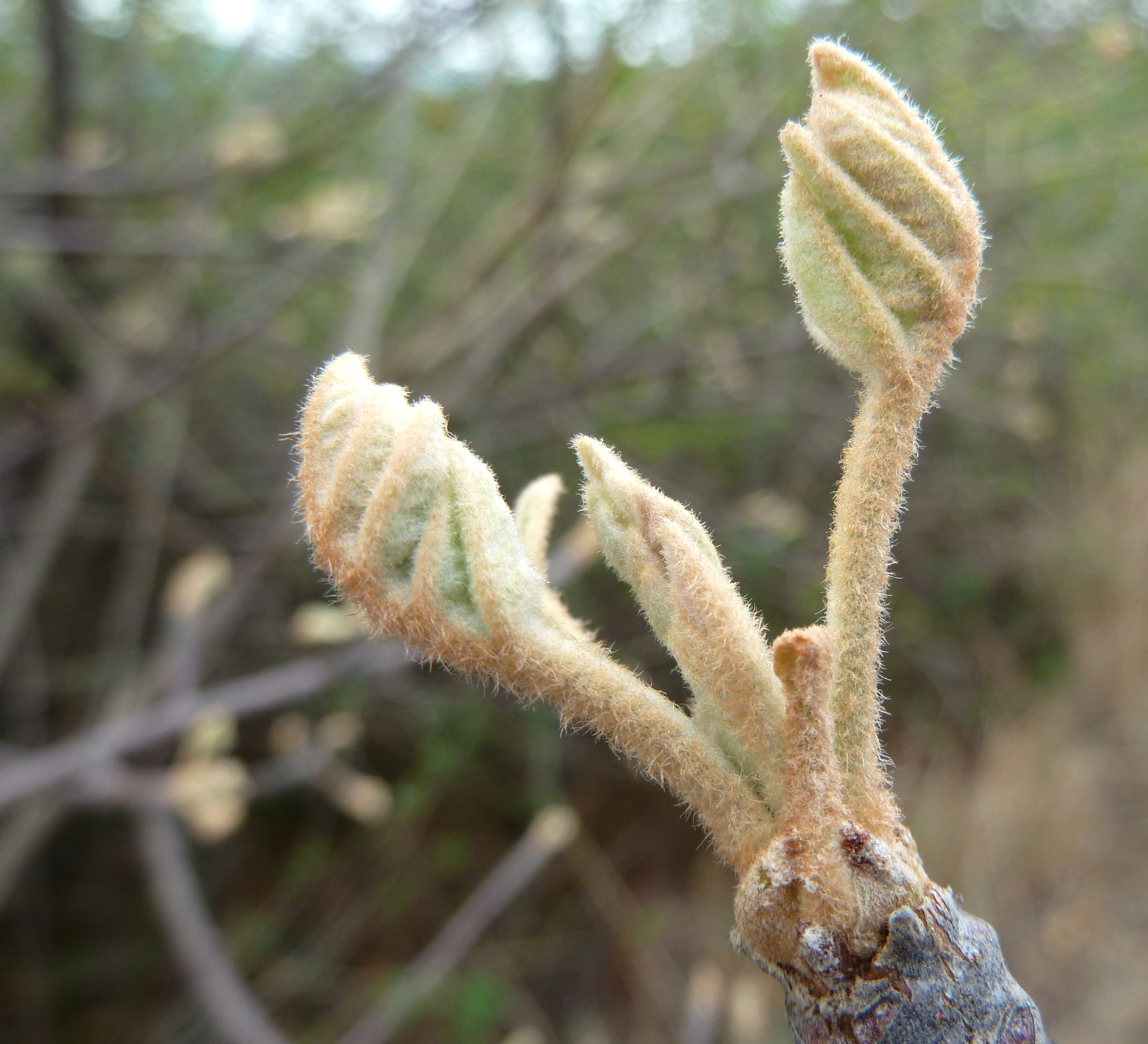
Spring foliage
