= Gilbertiodendron preussii =

Scientific classification
- Kingdom: Plantae
- Clade: Tracheophytes
- Clade: Angiosperms
- Clade: Eudicots
- Clade: Rosids
- Order: Fabales
- Family: Fabaceae
- Genus: Gilbertiodendron
- Species: G. preussii

Binomial name
- Gilbertiodendron preussii (Harms) Leonard

Species of legume

Gilbertiodendron preussii is a species of tree in the family Fabaceae, native to tropical rain forests in West Africa. It is commonly known as the Liberian red oak.

== Description ==
Gilbertiodendron preussii is a medium to large tree reaching a height of up to 35 m (115 ft). The trunk is cylindrical, with a diameter of up to 120 cm (4 ft), the lower two thirds usually being devoid of branches. The timber is used for construction, flooring and railway sleepers. It is also used for making canoes, furniture, tool handles and joinery.
