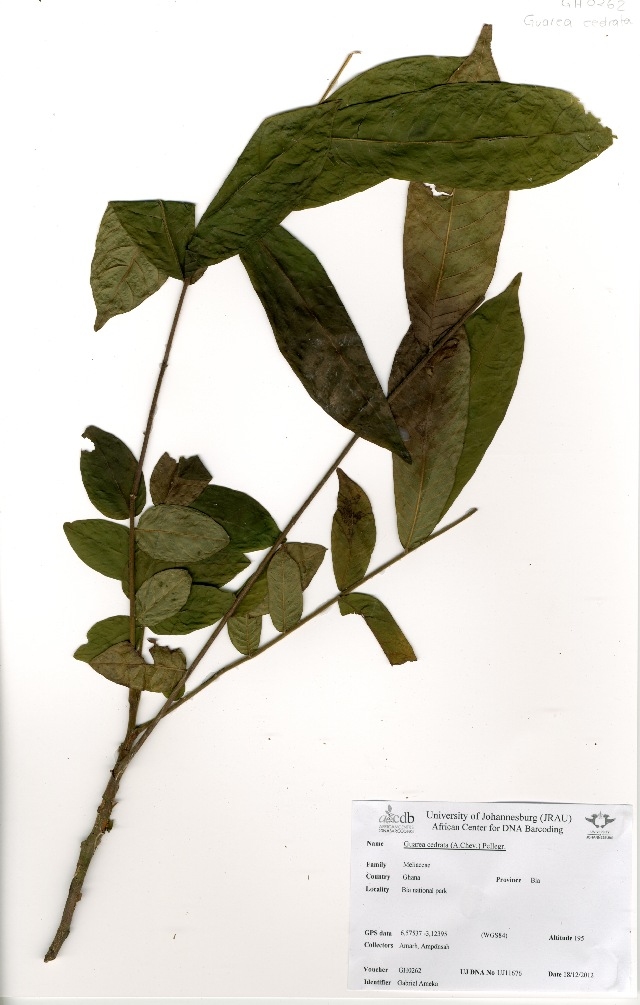
- Herbarium specimen
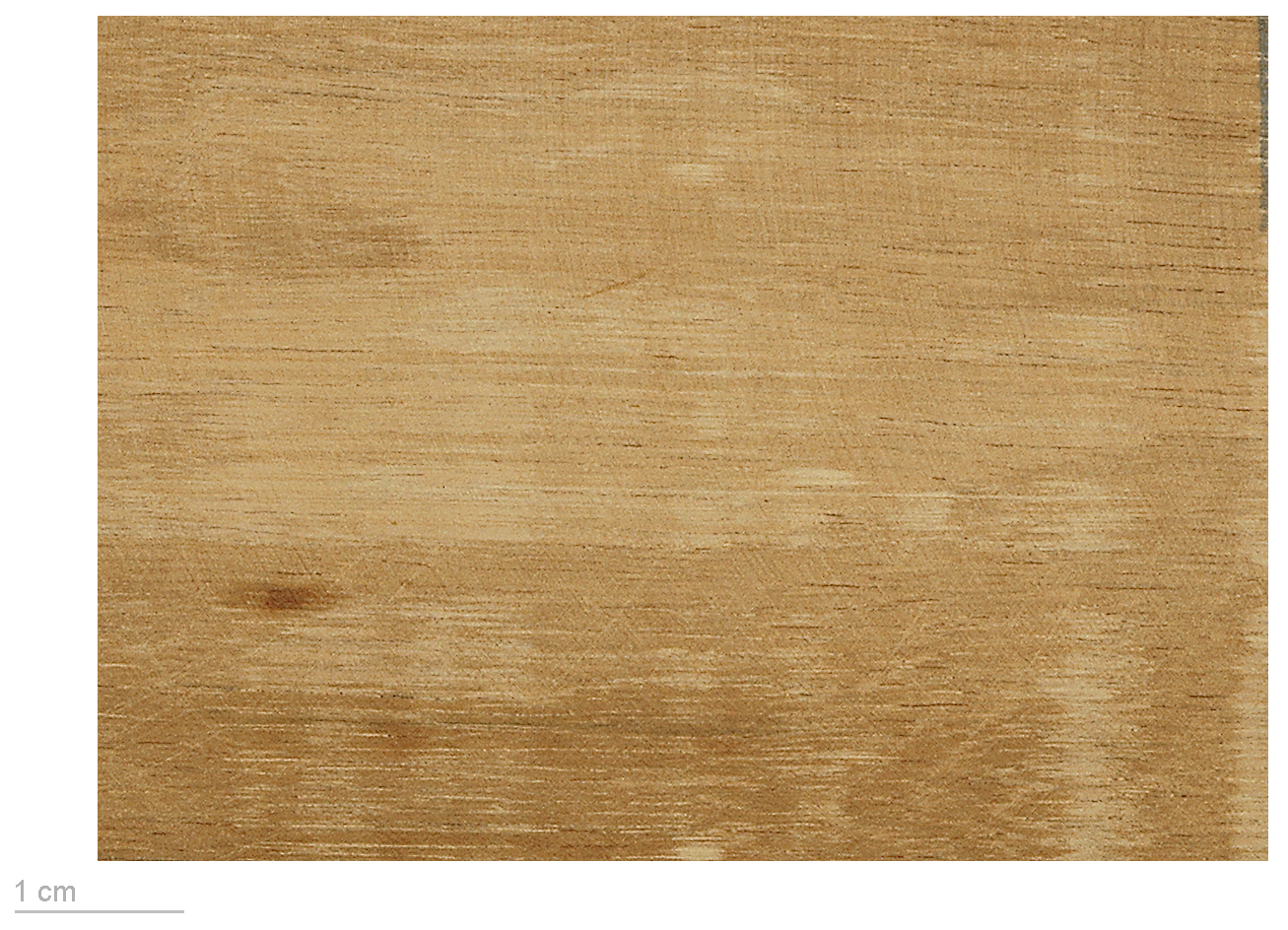
- Wood

Conservation status
- Vulnerable (IUCN 2.3)

Scientific classification
- Kingdom: Plantae
- Clade: Tracheophytes
- Clade: Angiosperms
- Clade: Eudicots
- Clade: Rosids
- Order: Sapindales
- Family: Meliaceae
- Genus: Guarea
- Species: G. cedrata

Binomial name
- Guarea cedrata (A. Chev.) Pellegrin

= Guarea cedrata =

Species of flowering plant

Guarea cedrata, also called light bossé or scented guarea, is a species of plant in the family Meliaceae. It is found in Cameroon, the Republic of the Congo, the Democratic Republic of the Congo, Ivory Coast, Ghana, Liberia, Nigeria, Sierra Leone, and Uganda. It is threatened by habitat loss.
