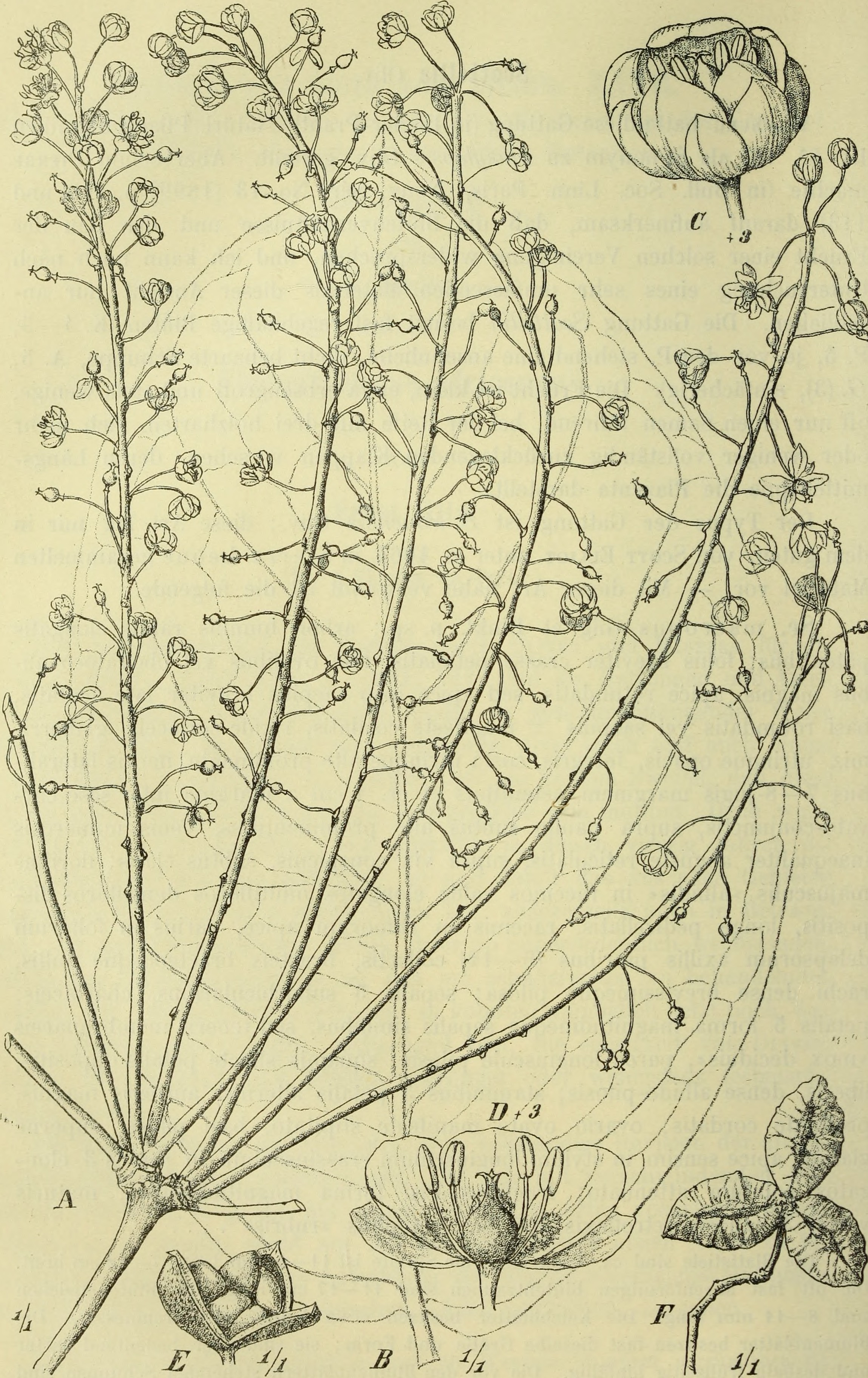
- 1907 botanical drawing, A–E: Scottellia macropus (now Scottellia leonensis); F: Scottellia orientalis

Scientific classification
- Kingdom: Plantae
- Clade: Tracheophytes
- Clade: Angiosperms
- Clade: Eudicots
- Clade: Rosids
- Order: Malpighiales
- Family: Achariaceae
- Genus: Scottellia; Oliv. (1893)

Species
- 3; see text

Synonyms
- Dasypetalum Pierre ex A.Chev. (1917)

= Scottellia =

Family of shrubs and trees

Scottellia is a genus of shrubs and trees in the family Achariaceae. Members of this genus are native to the tropical Africa.

== Species ==
Three species are accepted.

- Scottellia klaineana Pierre
- Scottellia leonensis Oliv.
- Scottellia orientalis Gilg
