= Berlinia occidentalis =

Conservation status
- Vulnerable (IUCN 2.3)

Scientific classification
- Kingdom: Plantae
- Clade: Tracheophytes
- Clade: Angiosperms
- Clade: Eudicots
- Clade: Rosids
- Order: Fabales
- Family: Fabaceae
- Genus: Berlinia
- Species: B. occidentalis

Binomial name
- Berlinia occidentalis Keay

Species of legume

Berlinia occidentalis is a species of plant in the family Fabaceae. It is found in Ivory Coast, Ghana, Liberia, and Sierra Leone. A medium-sized tree very similar to Berlinia bracteosa, its wood is used in construction and furniture.
