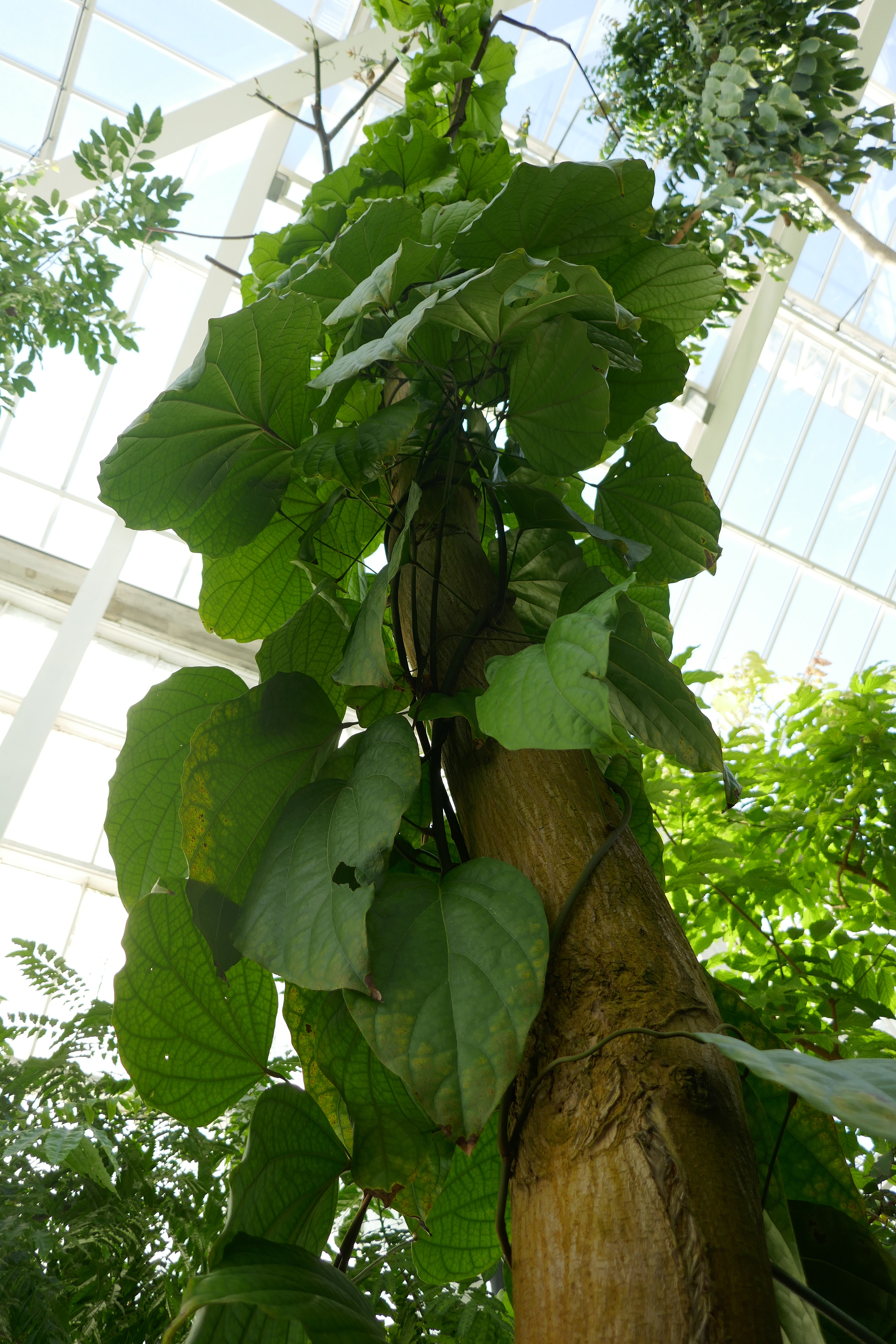
- Specimen with a vine clothing the trunk

Conservation status
- Least Concern (IUCN 3.1)

Scientific classification
- Kingdom: Plantae
- Clade: Tracheophytes
- Clade: Angiosperms
- Clade: Eudicots
- Clade: Rosids
- Order: Sapindales
- Family: Anacardiaceae
- Genus: Lannea
- Species: L. welwitschii

Binomial name
- Lannea welwitschii (Hiern) Engl.

Synonyms
- Calesiam welwitschii Hiern; Lannea acidissima A. Chev.; Ricinodendron staudtii Pax

= Lannea welwitschii =

Species of tree

Lannea welwitschii is a species of tree in the family Anacardiaceae. It is native to the tropical rainforests of West and Central Africa. The timber is used to make furniture and utensils and for many other purposes, the fruits can be eaten, and the bark is used to produce a dye, for making rope and in traditional medicine.

== Description ==
A medium-sized evergreen or deciduous tree, L. welwitschii can grow to a height of about 30 m (100 ft). The trunk is straight and cylindrical and up to 100 cm (40 in) in diameter. It has no buttresses. The bark is grey or greyish-brown and smooth at first, developing rounded shallow pits and flakes later. The inner bark is fibrous, being reddish with white streaks, and exudes a clear sticky fluid when damaged. The branches form a spreading crown and the twigs bear many lenticels. The leaves are in opposite pairs and are clustered at the ends of the branches. They are pinnate, up to 20 by 12 cm (8 by 5 in), with usually five to seven, ovate leaflets. The inflorescences are pyramidal panicles clad in yellowish hairs, up to 20 cm (8 in) long, growing in the leaf axils. The yellowish-green flowers are unisexual and regular with parts in fours. They are followed by single-seeded drupes, 6 to 8 mm (0.24 to 0.31 in) long, which are black when ripe.

== Distribution and habitat ==
The species is native to Western and Central Africa, its range extending from Liberia to Angola, Kenya and Ethiopia. It occurs in lowland rain forests below about 1,100 m (3,600 ft), with a preference for swampy or riverine locations. It is considered a pioneer species and is primarily found in secondary forest.

== Uses ==
Lannea welwitschii is fast-growing and can be coppiced or pollarded, and can be made into a living fence. An orange or reddish-brown dye can be extracted from the bark, and the fibres can be made into ropes and sandals. The heartwood of the timber is cream-coloured and light, but not durable. It is used for making household utensils, boxes, crates, veneers and plywood. It is also used in flooring, furniture, vehicle bodies, cabinet work, light joinery, matches and hardboard. The wood can be used for kindling, and the bole of the tree can be hollowed out to make a canoe.

The fruit can be eaten raw, being resinous with an acidic flavour. A decoction of the bark is used in traditional medicine for women's ailments, diarrhoea, dysentery, urethral discharge and haemorrhoids. The bark is applied as a pulp for the treatment of ulcers and skin ailments, and as a powder for treating wounds and snakebites. A decoction of the roots is used as an expectorant or emetic.
