= List of power stations in Ivory Coast =

This is a list of power stations in Ivory Coast. The majority of electricity generation (about 72.5%) in Ivory Coast is by power stations that burn natural gas; the remaining 27.5% of the country's generation is hydroelectricity. As of 2016, installed electric generation capacity totalled 1,975 megawatts (MW). Electric generation exceeded the country's needs; 5.31 billion kilowatt hours (kWh) of electricity was generated in 2005, of which the country consumed only 2.9 billion kWh. Export of electricity is through the West African Power Pool.

== Natural gas ==
List of natural gas powered power stations in Ivory Coast.

| Power station | Community | Coordinates | Capacity (MW) | Year completed |
|---|---|---|---|---|
| Ciprel Power Station | | | 455 | 1994 |
| Azito Power Station | | 5.3020741°N 4.075413°W | 430 | 1999 |
| Vridi Power Station | | | 100 | 1995 |
| Atinkou Thermal Power Station | Taboth, Jacqueville Department | 5.255833°N 4.328889°W | 390 | 2024 (expected) |

== Hydroelectric ==
Partial list of hydroelectric power stations in Ivory Coast.

| Hydroelectric station | Coordinates | Type | Name of reservoir | River | Capacity (MW) | Year completed |
|---|---|---|---|---|---|---|
| Gribo–Popoli Hydroelectric Power Station | 05°41′53″N 06°34′17″W | Gravity dam | | Sassandra River | 112 | 2024 (expected) |
| Soubré Hydroelectric Power Station | 05°48′09″N 06°39′21″W | Gravity dam | | Sassandra River | 275 | 2017 |
| Taabo Dam | 06°12′38″N 05°05′02″W | Reservoir | Taabo Reservoir | Bandama River | 210 | 1979 |
| Kossou Dam | 07°01′32″N 05°28′19″W | Reservoir | Lake Kossou | Bandama River | 176 | 1973 |
| Buyo Dam | 06°14′32″N 07°02′05″W | Reservoir | Buyo Reservoir | Sassandra River | 165 | 1980 |
| Ayamé 2 Dam | 05°34′55″N 03°09′32″W | Reservoir | | Bia River | 30 | 1965 |
| Ayamé 1 Dam | 05°36′12″N 03°10′12″W | Reservoir | | Bia River | 22 | 1959 |
| Faye Dam | | | | | 5 | 1983 |

== Solar ==
Partial list of solar power stations in Ivory Coast.

| Solar power station | Community | Coordinates | Fuel type | Capacity (megawatts) | Year completed | Name of owner | Notes |
|---|---|---|---|---|---|---|---|
| Boundiali Solar Power Station | Savanes District | 9.568611°N 6.476667°W | Solar | 37.5 | 2023 | SOGEPE | |
| Sokhoro Solar Power Station | Savanes District | 09°31′47″N 05°13′26″W | Solar | 52.0 | 2025 (expected) | PFO Africa | |

== Biomass ==
Partial list of biomass power stations in Ivory Coast.

| Biomass power station | Community | Coordinates | Fuel source | Capacity (megawatts) | Year completed | Name of owner | Notes |
|---|---|---|---|---|---|---|---|
| Boundiali Biomass Power Station | Savanes District | 09°29′31″N 06°30′12″W | Cotton stalks | 25 | 2025 (expected) | EcoStar Energy | |
| Ayebo Biomass Power Station | Comoé District | 05°26′22″N 03°16′09″W | Palm oil waste | 46 | 2024 (expected) | Biovéa Énergie SA | |
| Divo Biomass Power Station | Gôh-Djiboua District | 05°50′49″N 05°18′50″W | Cocoa fruit waste | 75 | 2028 (expected) | Soden | |

== See also ==
- Energy in Ivory Coast
- List of power stations in Africa
- List of largest power stations in the world
