= Geography of Ivory Coast =

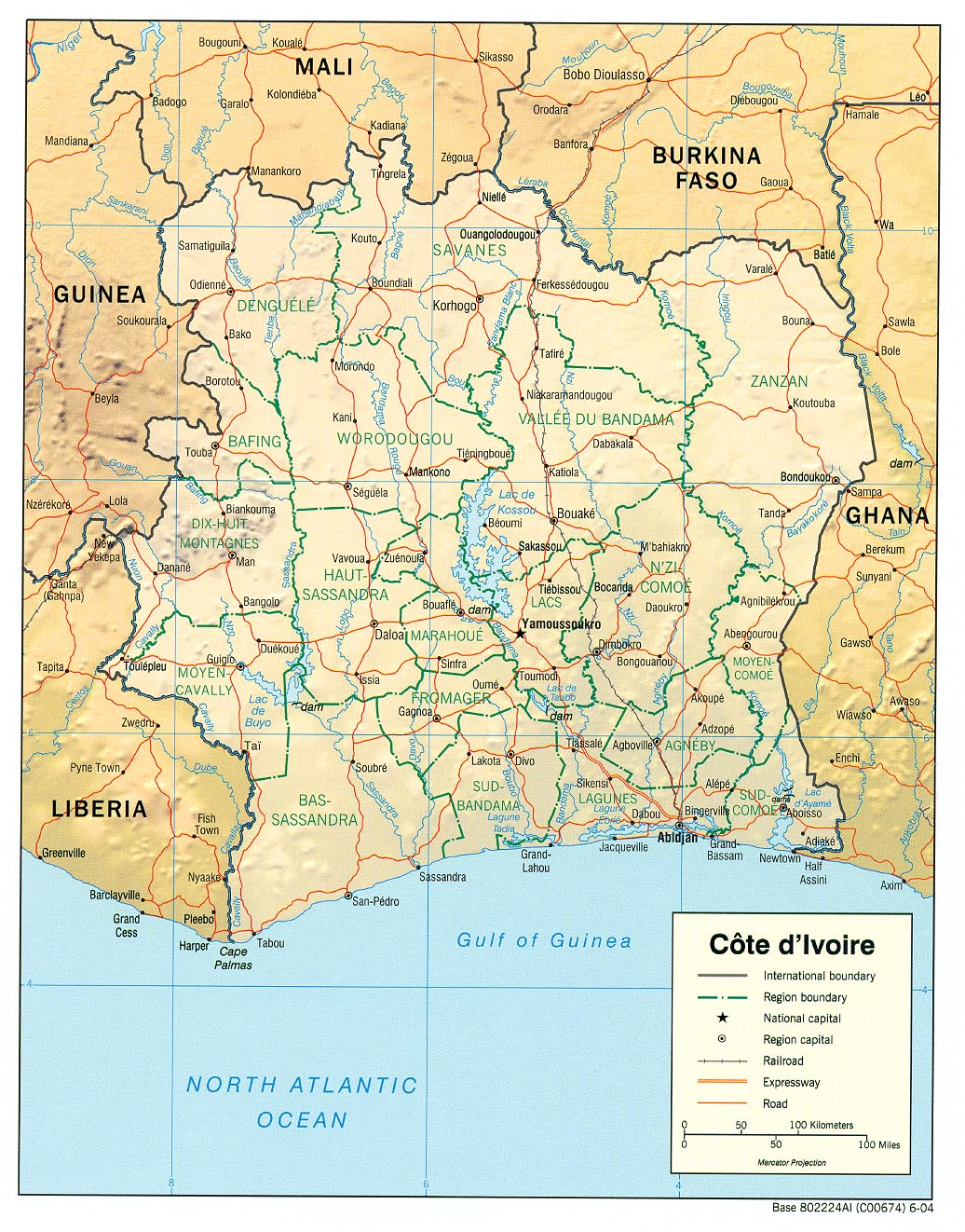
- Continent: Africa
- Region: Sub-Sahara
- Coordinates: 8°0'N, 500'W
- Area: Ranked 68th
  - Total: 78,699 km^{2} (30,386 sq mi)
  - Land: 4.89%
  - Water: 95.11%
- Coastline: 590 km (370 mi)
- Borders: Total land borders: 3,458 km (2,149 mi); Liberia: 778 km (483 mi); Ghana: 720 km (450 mi); Guinea: 816 km (507 mi); Burkina Faso: 545 km (339 mi); Mali: 599 km (372 mi)
- Highest point: Mont Nimba; 1,752 m (5,748 ft)
- Lowest point: Gulf of Guinea; 0 m/ft (sea level)
- Longest river: Bandama River
- Largest lake: Lake Kossou

Côte d'Ivoire map of Köppen climate classification.

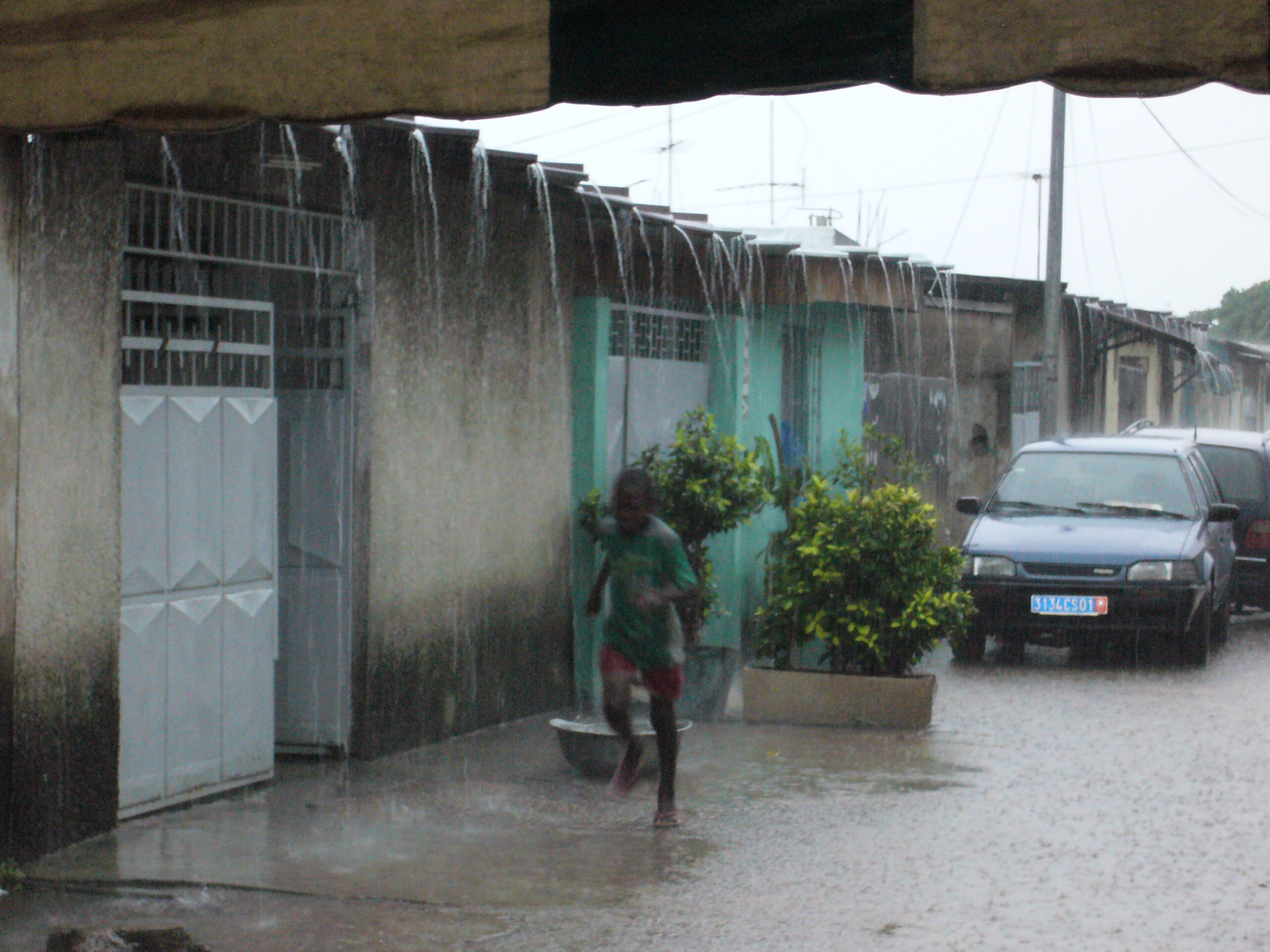
Heavy rain in Abidjan (June)

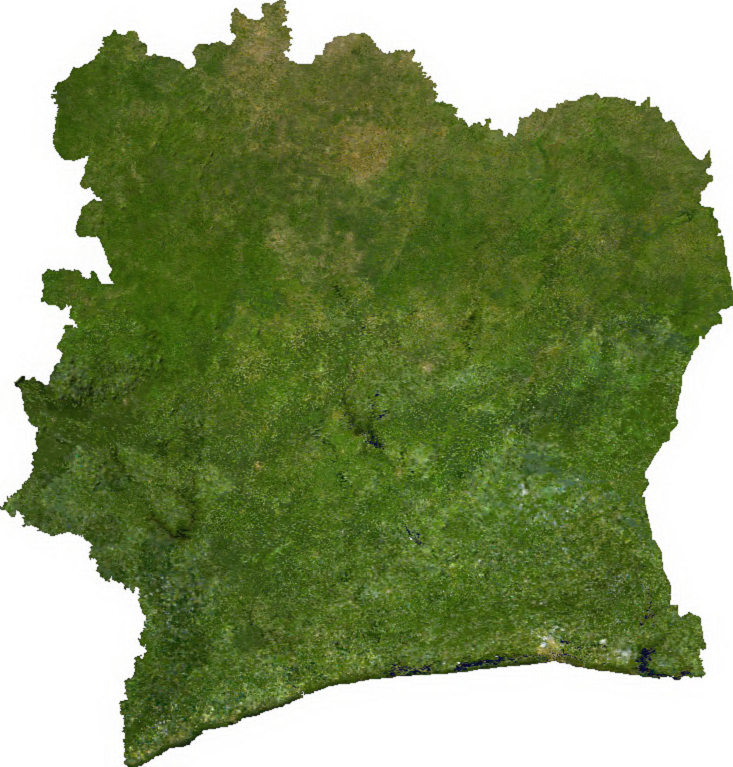
Satellite image of Côte d'Ivoire

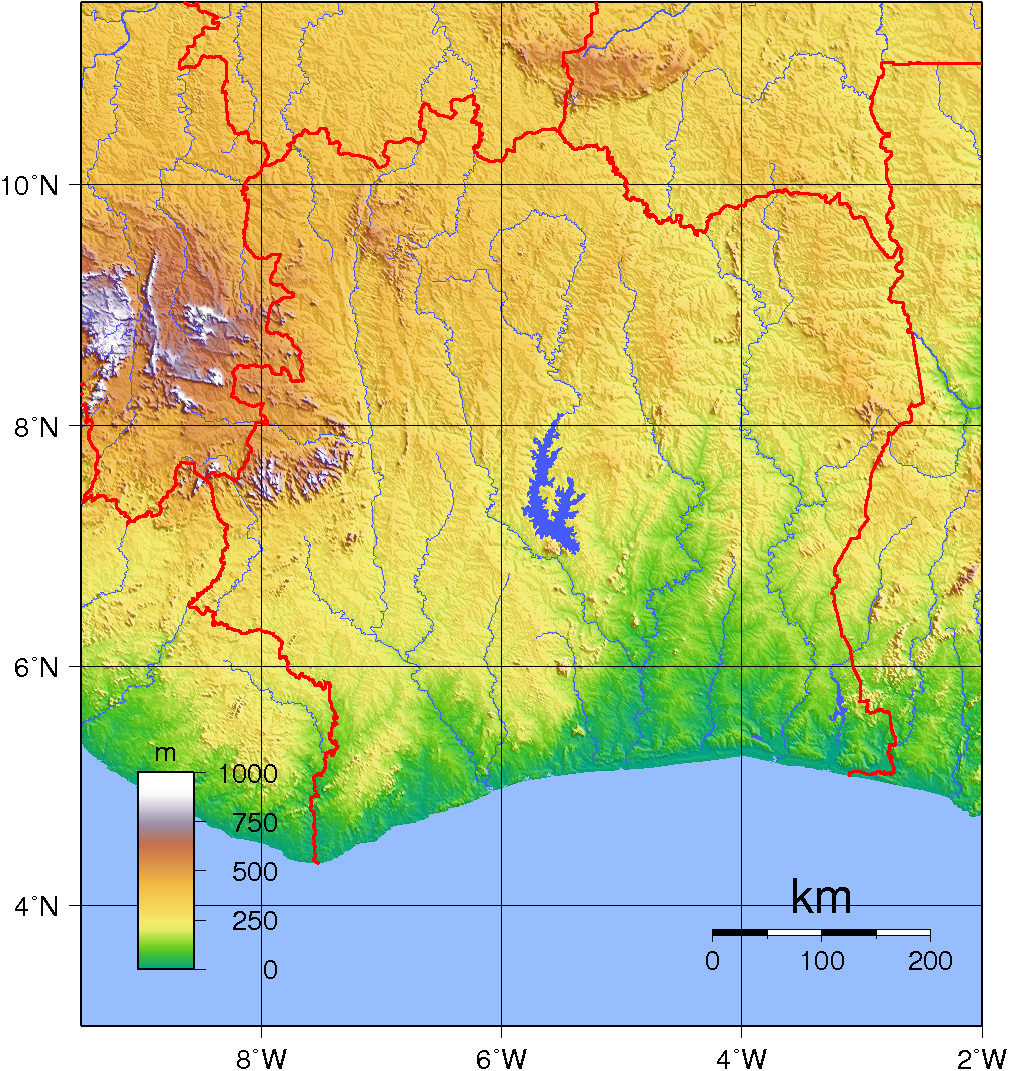
Topography of Ivory Coast

Ivory Coast (Côte d'Ivoire) is a sub-Saharan nation in southern West Africa located at 8° N, 5° W. The country is approximately square in shape.

== Area and borders ==
Area

- Total: 322,463 km^{2} (124,500 mi^{2})
  - Country rank in the world: 68th
- Land: 318,003 km^{2} (122,780 mi^{2})
- Water: 4,460 km^{2} (1,720 mi^{2})

Area comparatives

- Australia comparative: approximately 2/5 larger than Victoria
- Canada comparative: approximately half the size of Manitoba
- United Kingdom comparative: approximately 1/3 larger than the United Kingdom
- United States comparative: approx 1/4th of New Mexico
- EU comparative: slightly larger than Poland

Land borders

- Bordering countries:
  - Liberia to the southwest for 778 km (483 mi)
  - Guinea to the northwest for 816 km (507 mi)
  - Mali to the north-northwest for 599 km (372 mi)
  - Burkina Faso to the north-northeast for 545 km (339 mi)
  - Ghana to the east for 720 km (447 mi)
- Total: 3,458 km (2,149 mi)

Coastline

- 515 km (320 mi) on Gulf of Guinea

== Maritime claims ==
Ivory Coast makes maritime claims of 200 nautical miles (370 km) as an exclusive economic zone, 12 nautical miles (22 km) of territorial sea, and a 200-nautical-mile (370 km) continental shelf.

== Terrain and topography ==
Ivory Coast's terrain can generally be described as a large plateau rising gradually from sea level in the south to almost 500 m (1,600 ft) elevation in the north. The nation's natural resources have made it a comparatively prosperous nation in the African economy. The southeastern region of Ivory Coast is marked by coastal inland lagoons that start at the Ghanaian border and stretch 300 km (190 mi) along the eastern half of the coast. The southern region, especially the southwest, is covered with dense tropical moist forest. The Eastern Guinean forests extend from the Sassandra River across the south-central and southeast portion of Ivory Coast and east into Ghana, while the Western Guinean lowland forests extend west from the Sassandra River into Liberia and southeastern Guinea. The mountains of Dix-Huit Montagnes region, in the west of the country near the border with Guinea and Liberia, are home to the Guinean montane forests.

The Guinean forest-savanna mosaic belt extends across the middle of the country from east to west, and is the transition zone between the coastal forests and the interior savannas. The forest-savanna mosaic interlaces forest, savanna and grassland habitats. Northern Ivory Coast is part of the West Sudanian Savanna ecoregion of the tropical and subtropical grasslands, savannas, and shrublands biome. It is a zone of lateritic or sandy soils, with vegetation decreasing from south to north.

The terrain is mostly flat to undulating plain, with mountains in the northwest. The lowest elevation is at sea level on the coast. The highest elevation is Mount Nimba, at 1,752 metres (5,748 ft) in the far west of the country along the border with Guinea and Liberia.

== Rivers ==
The Cavalla River drains the western border area of the Ivory Coast and eastern Liberia. It forms the southern two-thirds of the border between Liberia and Ivory Coast.

The Sassandra River forms in the Guinea highlands and drains much of the western part of the Ivory Coast east of the Cavalla River.

The Bandama River is the longest river in the Ivory Coast, with a length of some 800 km (500 mi), draining the east central part of the country. In 1973 the Kossou Dam was constructed at Kossou on the Bandama, creating Lake Kossou. The capital, Yamoussoukro, is located near the river south of the lake.

The Komoé River originates on the Sikasso Plateau of Burkina Faso, and briefly forms the border between Burkina Faso and Ivory Coast before entering Ivory Coast. It drains the northeastern and easternmost portions of the country before emptying into the eastern end of the Ébrié Lagoon and ultimately the Gulf of Guinea in the Atlantic Ocean. Its waters contribute to the Comoé National Park.

== Climate ==
The climate of Ivory Coast is generally hot and humid. Most of the country has a tropical savanna climate (Köppen Aw), although the Upper Guinean forest region bordering Liberia has a tropical monsoon climate (Am). In the north, there are three seasons: warm and dry (November to March), hot and dry (March to May), and hot and wet (June to October), whilst in the south there are two rainy seasons between April and July, and between October and November, a longer dry season from December to February, and a shorter dry season in August. Temperatures average between 25 and 32 °C (77.0 and 89.6 °F) and range from 10 to 40 °C (50 to 104 °F).

Climate data for Abidjan, Cote d'Ivoire
Month	Jan	Feb	Mar	Apr	May	Jun	Jul	Aug	Sep	Oct	Nov	Dec	Year
Record high °C (°F)	35.0 (95.0)	35.7 (96.3)	34.9 (94.8)	35.0 (95.0)	34.9 (94.8)	36.2 (97.2)	34.0 (93.2)	32.0 (89.6)	32.1 (89.8)	32.8 (91.0)	35.0 (95.0)	33.7 (92.7)	36.2 (97.2)
Mean daily maximum °C (°F)	30.5 (86.9)	31.0 (87.8)	31.1 (88.0)	31.2 (88.2)	30.4 (86.7)	28.7 (83.7)	27.4 (81.3)	26.9 (80.4)	27.6 (81.7)	29.2 (84.6)	30.5 (86.9)	30.3 (86.5)	29.6 (85.3)
Daily mean °C (°F)	26.8 (80.2)	27.7 (81.9)	27.9 (82.2)	27.7 (81.9)	26.9 (80.4)	25.8 (78.4)	24.7 (76.5)	24.5 (76.1)	25.6 (78.1)	26.8 (80.2)	27.4 (81.3)	27.0 (80.6)	26.6 (79.9)
Mean daily minimum °C (°F)	23.5 (74.3)	24.6 (76.3)	24.9 (76.8)	24.9 (76.8)	24.6 (76.3)	23.7 (74.7)	22.9 (73.2)	22.1 (71.8)	22.3 (72.1)	23.6 (74.5)	24.4 (75.9)	23.8 (74.8)	23.8 (74.8)
Record low °C (°F)	14.7 (58.5)	16.0 (60.8)	19.0 (66.2)	15.9 (60.6)	18.5 (65.3)	18.6 (65.5)	17.1 (62.8)	17.2 (63.0)	15.2 (59.4)	17.5 (63.5)	19.5 (67.1)	16.5 (61.7)	14.7 (58.5)
Average rainfall mm (inches)	16.3 (0.64)	48.9 (1.93)	106.7 (4.20)	141.3 (5.56)	293.5 (11.56)	561.8 (22.12)	205.7 (8.10)	36.8 (1.45)	80.5 (3.17)	137.7 (5.42)	143.3 (5.64)	75.1 (2.96)	1,847.6 (72.75)
Average rainy days (≥ 0.1 mm)	3	4	9	11	19	22	12	8	11	14	16	9	138
Average relative humidity (%)	84	86	83	82	84	86	85	86	89	87	83	83	85
Mean monthly sunshine hours	183	212	226	210	192	117	115	121	141	202	225	208	2,152
Source 1: Deutscher Wetterdienst
Source 2: Danish Meteorological Institute

Climate data for Yamoussoukro
Month	Jan	Feb	Mar	Apr	May	Jun	Jul	Aug	Sep	Oct	Nov	Dec	Year
Mean daily maximum °C (°F)	31.5 (88.7)	33.5 (92.3)	33.5 (92.3)	32.9 (91.2)	31.7 (89.1)	30.1 (86.2)	28.6 (83.5)	28.5 (83.3)	29.3 (84.7)	30.1 (86.2)	30.7 (87.3)	30.1 (86.2)	30.9 (87.6)
Daily mean °C (°F)	25.2 (77.4)	27.3 (81.1)	27.6 (81.7)	27.3 (81.1)	26.5 (79.7)	25.6 (78.1)	24.5 (76.1)	24.5 (76.1)	24.8 (76.6)	25.2 (77.4)	25.5 (77.9)	24.5 (76.1)	25.7 (78.3)
Mean daily minimum °C (°F)	18.9 (66.0)	21.2 (70.2)	21.8 (71.2)	21.8 (71.2)	21.3 (70.3)	21.1 (70.0)	20.4 (68.7)	20.6 (69.1)	20.4 (68.7)	20.4 (68.7)	20.3 (68.5)	19 (66)	20.6 (69.1)
Average precipitation mm (inches)	13 (0.5)	42 (1.7)	108 (4.3)	126 (5.0)	155 (6.1)	165 (6.5)	88 (3.5)	83 (3.3)	170 (6.7)	125 (4.9)	36 (1.4)	15 (0.6)	1,126 (44.5)
Source: Climate-Data.org, altitude: 236m

== Cropland ==
Nine percent of the country is arable land. Ivory Coast is the world's largest producer of cocoa, a major national cash crop. Other chief crops include coffee, bananas, and oil palms, which produce palm oil and kernels. Mineral resources include petroleum, natural gas, diamonds, manganese, iron, cobalt, bauxite, copper, gold, nickel, tantalum, silica sand, clay, palm oil. Hydropower is also generated.

== Forests ==
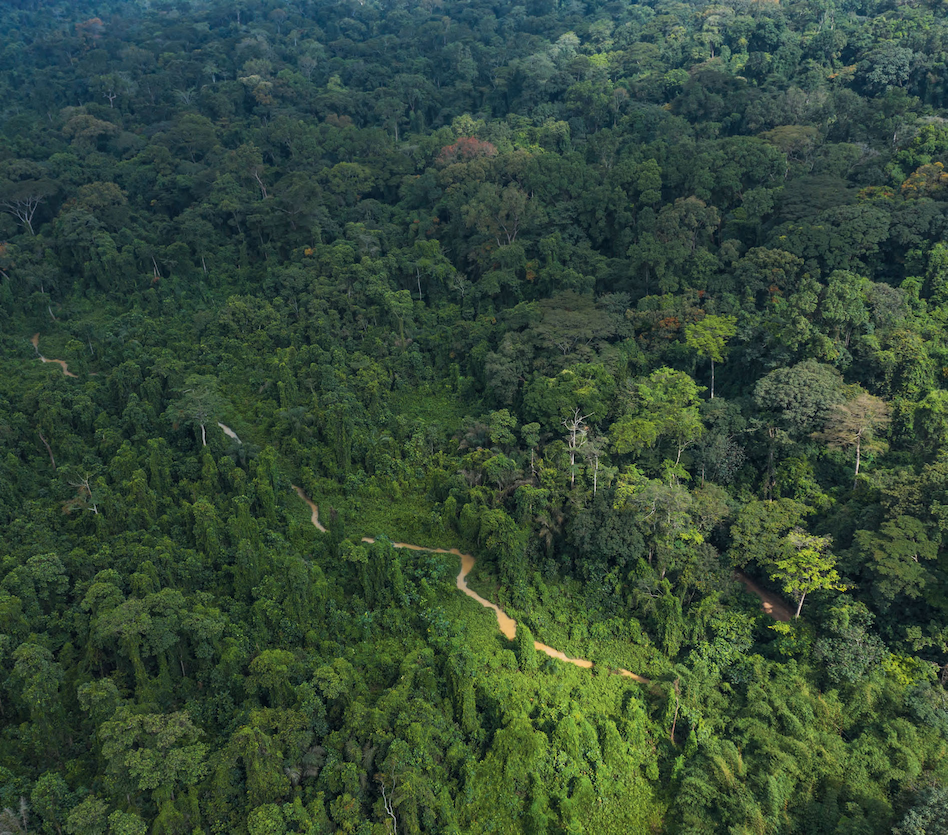
Banco forest

Ivory Coast has a large timber industry due to its large forest coverage. The nation's hardwood exports match those of Brazil. In recent years there has been much concern about the rapid rate of deforestation. Rainforests are being destroyed at a rate sometimes cited as the highest in the world. The only forest left completely untouched in Ivory Coast is Taï National Park (Parc National de Taï), a 3,600 km^{2} (1,390 sq mi) area in the country's far southwest that is home to over 150 endemic species and many other endangered species such as the Pygmy hippopotamus and 11 species of monkeys.

=== Tree cover extent and loss ===
Global Forest Watch publishes annual estimates of tree cover loss and 2000 tree cover extent derived from time-series analysis of Landsat satellite imagery in the Global Forest Change dataset. In this framework, tree cover refers to vegetation taller than 5 m (including natural forests and tree plantations), and tree cover loss is defined as the complete removal of tree cover canopy for a given year, regardless of cause.

For Ivory Coast, country statistics report cumulative tree cover loss of 3,985,675 ha (39,856.75 km^{2}) from 2001 to 2024 (about 26.8% of its 2000 tree cover area). For tree cover density greater than 30%, country statistics report a 2000 tree cover extent of 14,866,948 ha (148,669.48 km^{2}). The charts and table below display this data. In simple terms, the annual loss number is the area where tree cover disappeared in that year, and the extent number shows what remains of the 2000 tree cover baseline after subtracting cumulative loss. Forest regrowth is not included in the dataset.

Annual tree cover loss in Ivory Coast, 2001–2024. View chart definition.
Tree cover extent in 2000 minus cumulative tree cover loss in Ivory Coast, 2001–2024 (loss-only residual; does not account for gain). View chart definition.

Annual tree cover extent and loss
Year	Tree cover extent (km2) (Note: This residual measure does not include forest regrowth.)	Annual tree cover loss (km2)
2001	147,442.54	1,226.94
2002	145,996.89	1,445.65
2003	145,133.90	862.99
2004	144,653.36	480.54
2005	144,000.00	653.36
2006	143,022.24	977.76
2007	142,113.48	908.76
2008	140,837.65	1,275.83
2009	139,748.79	1,088.86
2010	138,823.60	925.19
2011	137,576.23	1,247.37
2012	136,614.85	961.38
2013	134,856.61	1,758.24
2014	131,387.60	3,469.01
2015	129,863.07	1,524.53
2016	127,651.82	2,211.25
2017	124,078.74	3,573.08
2018	120,831.94	3,246.80
2019	118,409.92	2,422.02
2020	115,924.43	2,485.49
2021	114,091.70	1,832.73
2022	112,366.91	1,724.79
2023	110,463.93	1,902.98
2024	108,812.73	1,651.20

=== REDD+ reference levels and monitoring ===
Under the UNFCCC REDD+ framework, Ivory Coast has submitted national reference levels for results-based payments. On the UNFCCC REDD+ Web Platform, the country’s 2017 and 2024 submission packages are both listed as having assessed reference levels; a national strategy is listed as “not reported”, safeguards information as reported, and a national forest monitoring system as “not reported”.

The first assessed submission, technically assessed in 2018, covered the REDD+ activities “reducing emissions from deforestation” and “enhancement of forest carbon stocks” at national scale. Using a historical reference period of 2000–2015, the modified forest reference emission level (FREL) was reported as a time-varying benchmark, declining from about 41.2 million to 20.6 million t CO2 eq between the start and end of the reference period. The technical assessment reported that it included above-ground biomass (AGB) and below-ground biomass (BGB), deadwood and litter for deforestation, and above-ground biomass and below-ground biomass for enhancement of forest carbon stocks, with CO2 only.

An updated national FREL and forest reference level (FRL) was submitted in 2024 and assessed in 2025. It expanded coverage to reducing emissions from deforestation, reducing emissions from forest degradation, and enhancement of forest carbon stocks, using a 2015–2020 reference period. The assessed values were 32,363,393 t CO2 eq per year for the FREL and −350,986 t CO2 eq per year for the FRL. The technical assessment states that the updated benchmark included AGB, BGB, deadwood, litter and soil organic carbon overall, although soil organic carbon was not included for forest degradation and enhancement of forest carbon stocks included only AGB; it also included CO2, CH_{4} and N_{2}O, with non-CO2 gases counted only for deforestation.

== Natural hazards ==
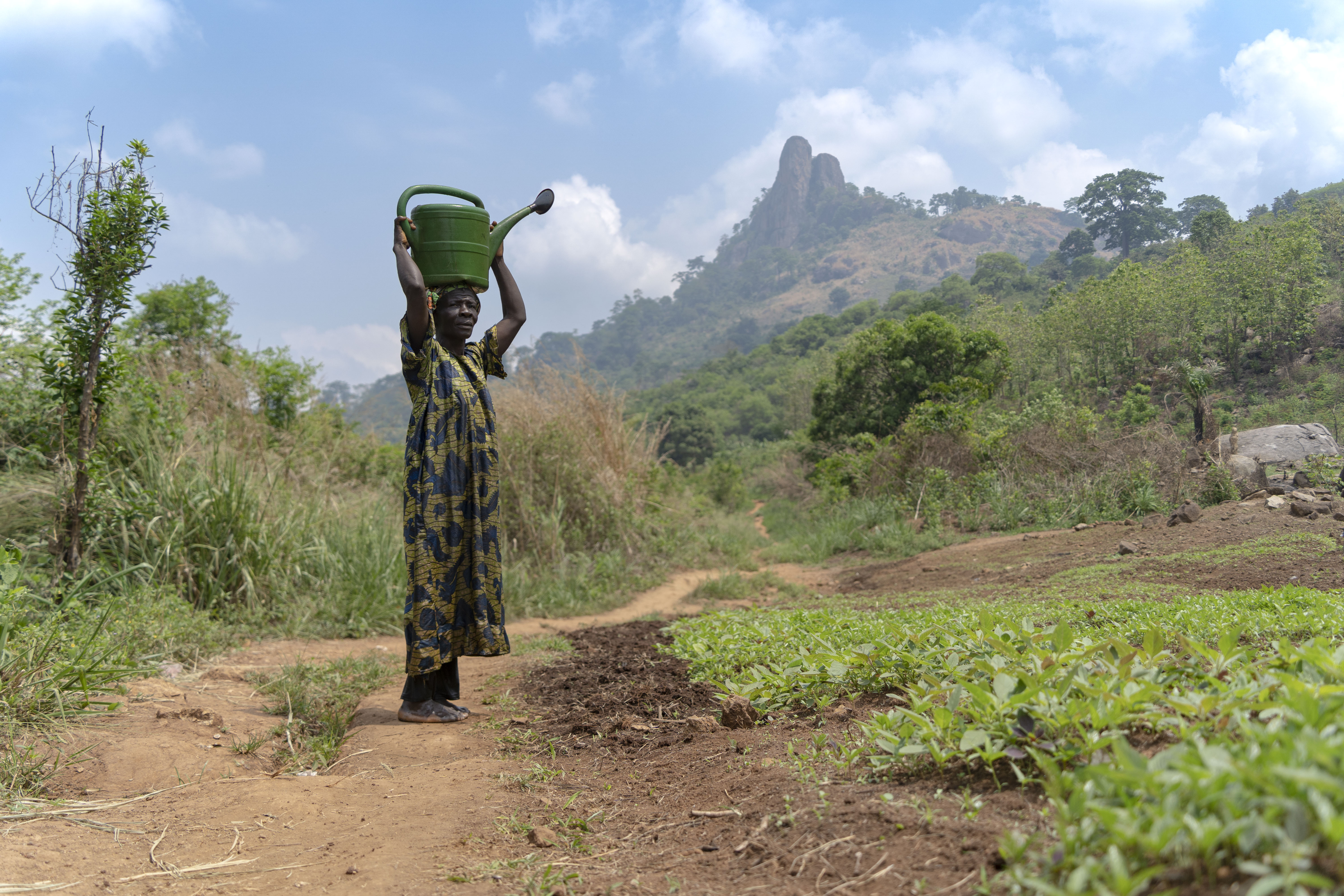
A woman carries water from the Dou River, mountain Dent de Man

Natural hazards include the heavy surf and the lack of natural harbors on the coast; during the rainy season torrential flooding is a danger.

== Extreme points ==
Extreme points are the geographic points that are farther north, south, east or west than any other location in the country.

- Northernmost point — the point at which the border with Mali enters the Bagoé River, Savanes District
- Southernmost point — Boubré, Bas-Sassandra District
- Easternmost point — unnamed location on the border with Ghana south-west of the town of Tambi, Zanzan District
- Westernmost point — unnamed location on the border with Liberia in the Nuon River west of Klobli, Montagnes District

== See also ==
- Subdivisions of Ivory Coast
- Wildlife of Ivory Coast
