= Marahoué River =

Watercourse in the Ivory Coast

Coordinates: 6°53′58″N 5°31′43″W

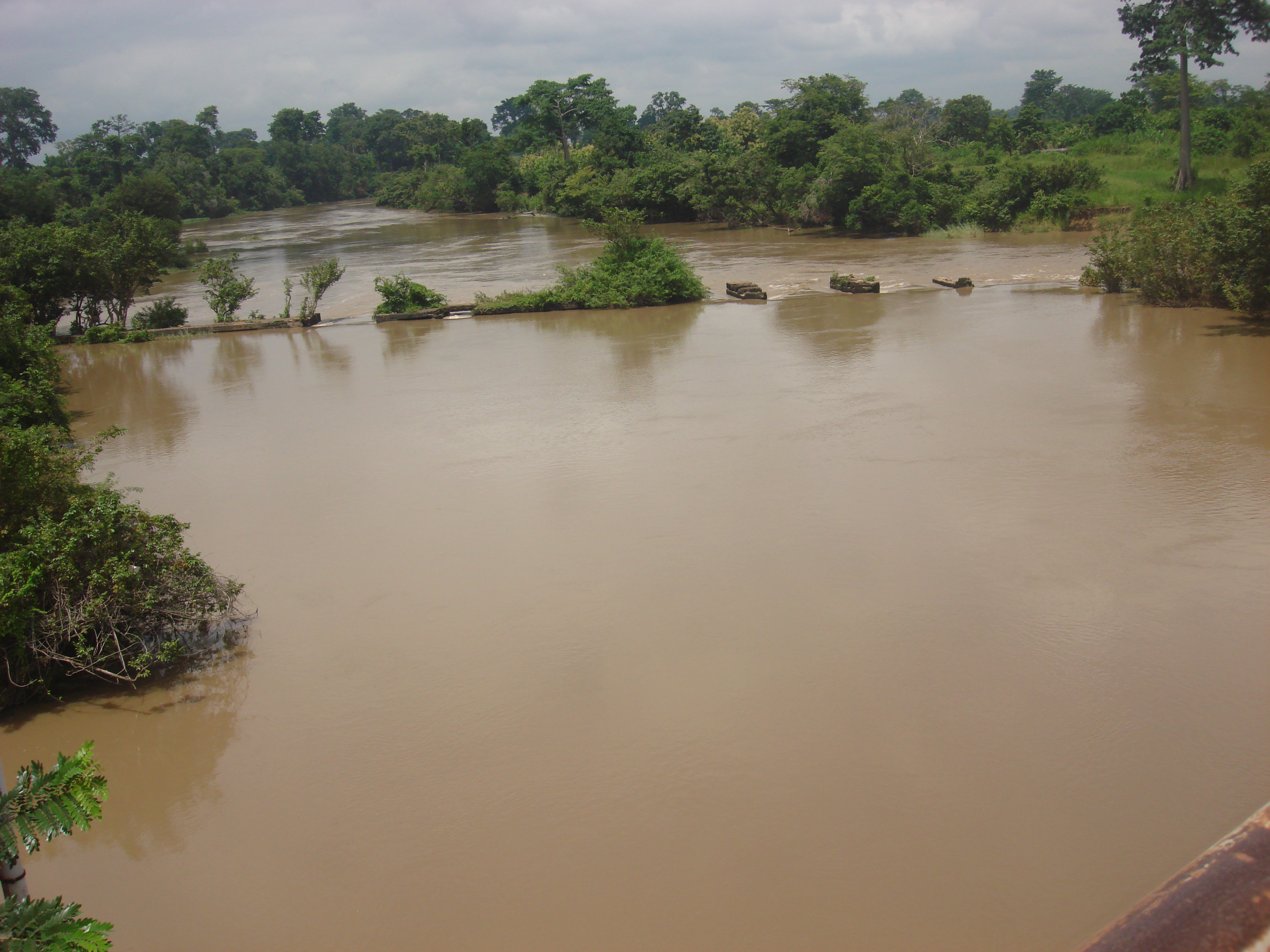
The Marahoué River near Bouaflé

The Marahoué River, also known as the Bandama Rouge, is a river in Ivory Coast. The south-flowing river is a tributary of the Bandama River, joining it south of Lake Kossou, a large artificial lake created in 1973 by the construction of the Kossou Dam at Kossou.

== Geography ==
The Marahoué River has a length of about 550 km (342 mi). It originates southwest of Boundiali in the Bagoué region of the Savanes district. It flows southwards to join the right bank of the Bandama between Bouaflé and Yamoussoukro after a journey of about 550 km. Its main tributaries are the Yarani River and the Béré River. It gives its name to the Marahoué region and the Marahoué National Park.
