= Atinkou Thermal Power Station =

Power station in Ivory Coast

- Country: Ivory Coast
- Location: Taboth, Jacqueville Department
- Coordinates: 05°15′21″N 04°19′44″W
- Status: Under construction
- Commission date: 2024 Expected
- Owner: Atinkou S.A.

Thermal power station
- Primary fuel: Natural gas
- Secondary fuel: Steam

Power generation
- Nameplate capacity: 390 MW (520,000 hp)

Atinkou Thermal Power Station, also Atinkou Efficient Power Station, is a 390 MW (520,000 hp) natural gas-fired thermal power plant under construction, in Taboth Village, near the town of Jacqueville, in the Ivory Coast.

== Location ==
The power station is located in the village of Taboth, near the town known as Jacqueville, in Jacqueville Department. Jacqueville is located approximately 61 kilometres (38 mi), southwest of the city of Abidjan, the capital of Ivory Coast. The power station sits on a site that measures 30 hectares (74 acres).

== Overview ==
This new, modern power station is intended to replace the old, inefficient thermal power stations, including (a) the 200 MW Aggreko Thermal Power Plant (b) the 100 MW Vridi Thermal Power Plant and (c) the 99 MW Ciprel I Thermal Power Plant. Atinkou Power Station is also expected to form the "baseload backbone", on which to attach intermittent solar and hydroelectric supply.

The power station is a combined cycle installation with two phases, built separately but intended to work in synchronized harmony. The first cycle is expected to be built over an 18 months period, using a 255 MW gas turbine. In this phase, natural gas is mixed with air and ignited. The hot air produced, turns the turbine to generate the electricity.

The second phase, expected to be added after the first, comprises the addition of a "heat recovery boiler" and a 135 MW steam turbine, over a 9 months period to form a 390 MW combined cycle power station. The heat recovery boiler extracts some of the heat from the first cycle and uses it to heat water, producing steam. The steam is then used to produce more electricity, without any new natural gas. Total energy output by Atinkou Power Station is calculated at 2,800 GWh annually.

== Ownership ==
The special purpose vehicle that owns and will operate this power station is called Atinkou S.A., a 100 percent subsidiary of the Eranove Group. Eranove is a French water and electricity development and management conglomerate, headquartered in Paris, France. Atinkou S.A. will sell the energy generated here to the Ivorian electricity utility company, Société de Gestion du Patrimoine du Secteur de l'Electricité (SOGEPE), under a 20 year power purchase agreement.

== Funding ==
Development of this power station benefitted from loans, amounting to €404 million obtained from (a) International Finance Corporation (b) African Development Bank (c) German Investment Corporation (d) German Development Agency (e) FMO (Netherlands) (f) Emerging Africa Infrastructure Fund (EAIF) and (g) OPEC Fund for International Development.

== See also ==
- List of power stations in Ivory Coast
