= Taabo Dam =

Coordinates: 6°14′N 5°5′W

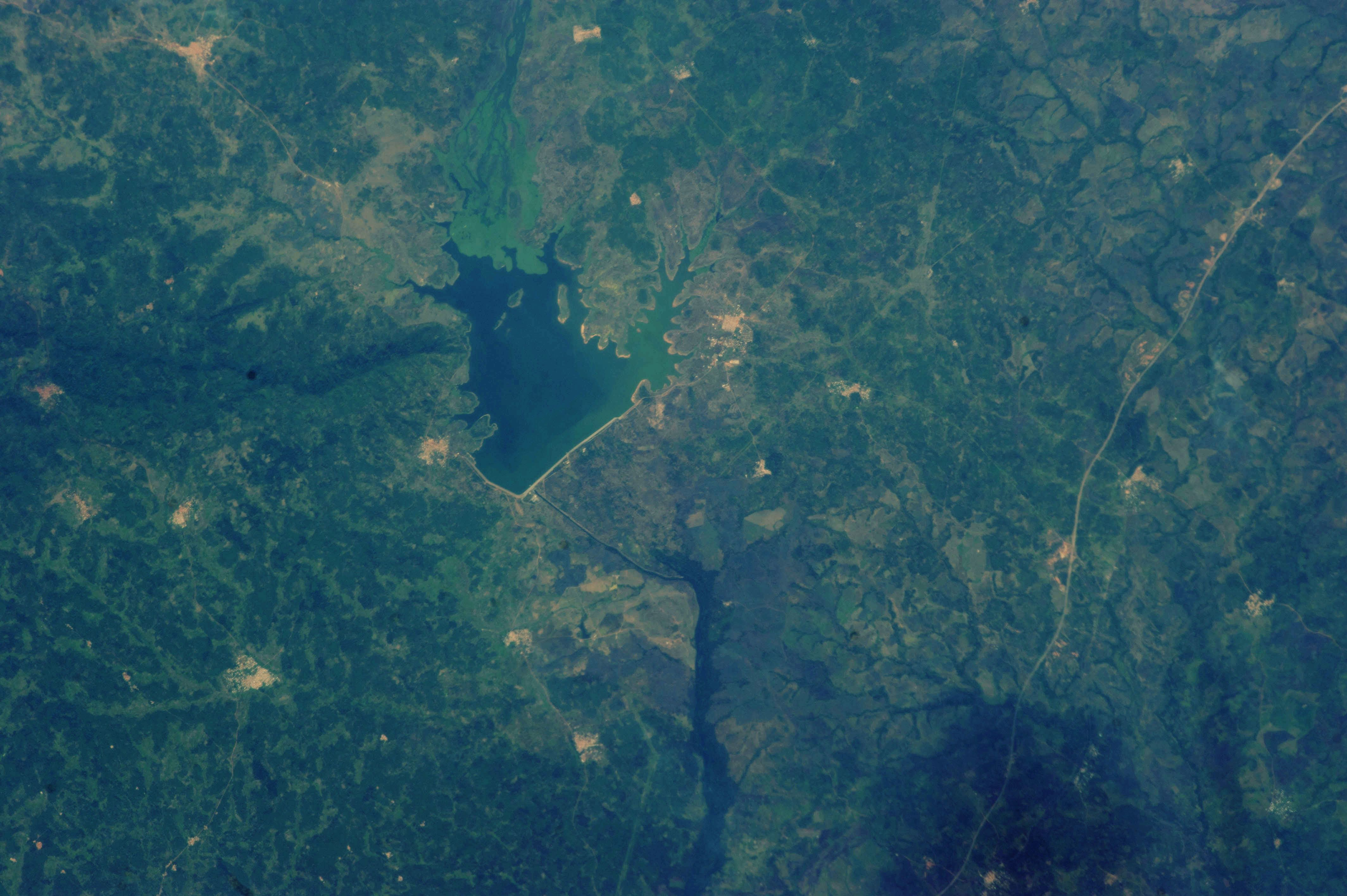
- Location: Côte d'Ivoire
- Purpose: Power
- Status: Operational

Dam and spillways
- Impounds: Bandama River

Reservoir
- Creates: Lac de Taabo

Power Station
- Installed capacity: 210 MW (280,000 hp)

The Taabo Dam is a hydroelectric power plant of the Bandama River in Côte d'Ivoire with a power generating capacity of 210 megawatts (280,000 hp), enough to power over 141,000 homes. It was formed in 1975. This dam is located downstream from Kossou Dam. This is an "earth and rockfill dam with clay core 8100 m long and 43 m high." It has "five openings giving a maximum discharge capacity of 3,900 m3/sec through radial gates 11 x 11 m" with concrete spillway on the left bank that has a crest level of 113 m above sea level.
