= Energy in Ivory Coast =

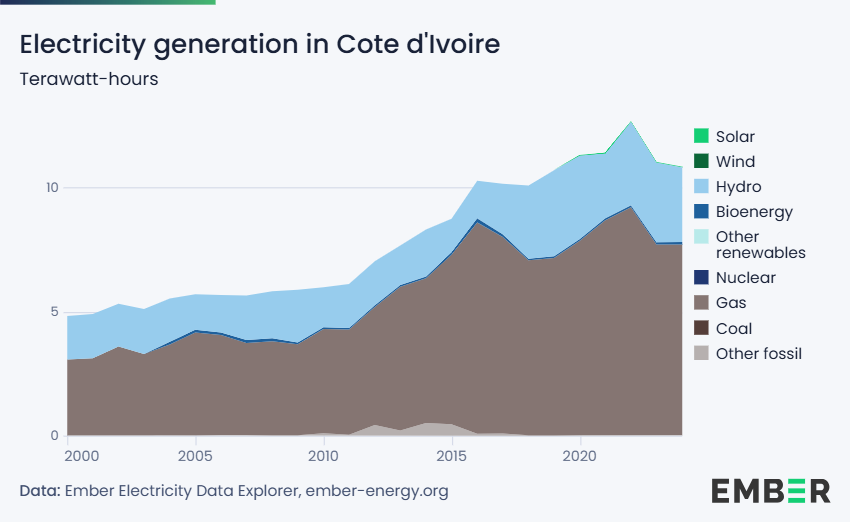
Electricity generation in Ivory Coast in terawatt-hours

Energy in Ivory Coast concerns the production and export of energy and electricity in the Ivory Coast. The country has a capacity of 2,200 megawatts (MW) energy production. Unlike other countries in sub-Saharan Africa, the Ivory Coast is a reliable power supplier in the region, exporting electricity to neighbouring countries such as Ghana, Burkina Faso, Benin, Togo, and Mali. Ivory Coast aims to produce enough renewable energy by 2030 to reduce its greenhouse gas emissions by 28%.

== Solar energy ==
Ivory Coast aims to reach 400 MW in generating capacity from solar power by 2030. The country is building the Boundiali Solar Power Station, which will have a capacity of 37.5 megawatt-peak (MWp).

== See also ==
- List of power stations in Ivory Coast
