= Enteromius stigmatopygus =

Conservation status
- Least Concern (IUCN 3.1)

Scientific classification
- Domain: Eukaryota
- Kingdom: Animalia
- Phylum: Chordata
- Class: Actinopterygii
- Order: Cypriniformes
- Family: Cyprinidae
- Subfamily: Smiliogastrinae
- Genus: Enteromius
- Species: E. stigmatopygus

Binomial name
- Enteromius stigmatopygus Boulenger, 1903

Synonyms
- Barbus alberti Poll, 1939; Barbus gourmansis Pellegrin, 1934; Barbus karoualensis Blache & Miton, 1960; Barbus miolepis Boulenger, 1903; Barbus werneri Boulenger, 1905

Species of fish

Enteromius stigmatopygus is a species of ray-finned fish in the genus Enteromius. It is found in the Nile, Niger and Volta rivers systems, it is also found in rivers in Guinea-Bissau and the Chad and Bandama rivers.

== Footnotes ==
- Froese, Rainer; Pauly, Daniel (eds.). "Enteromius stigmatopygus". FishBase.
