= Wildlife of Ivory Coast =

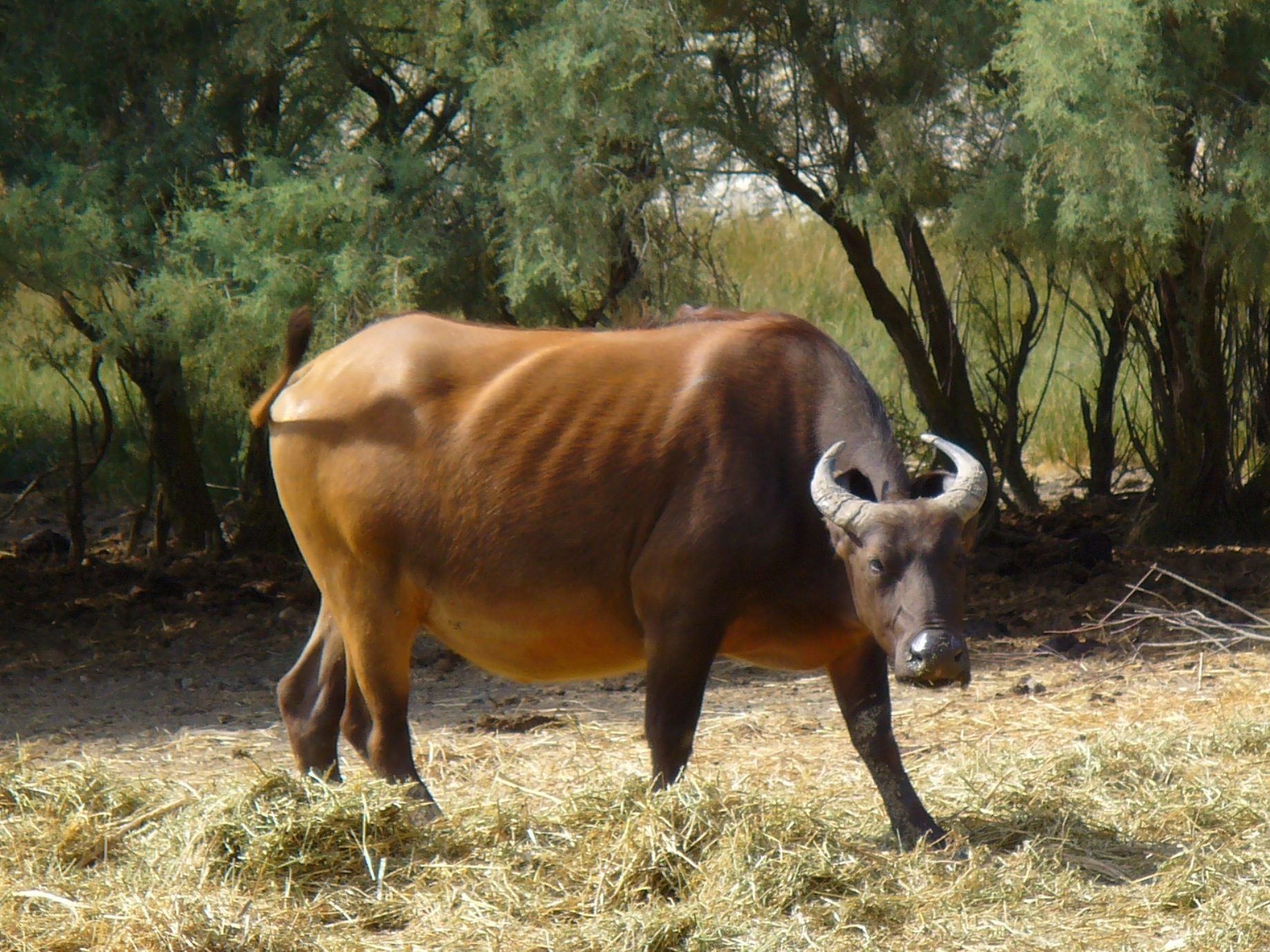
African buffalo

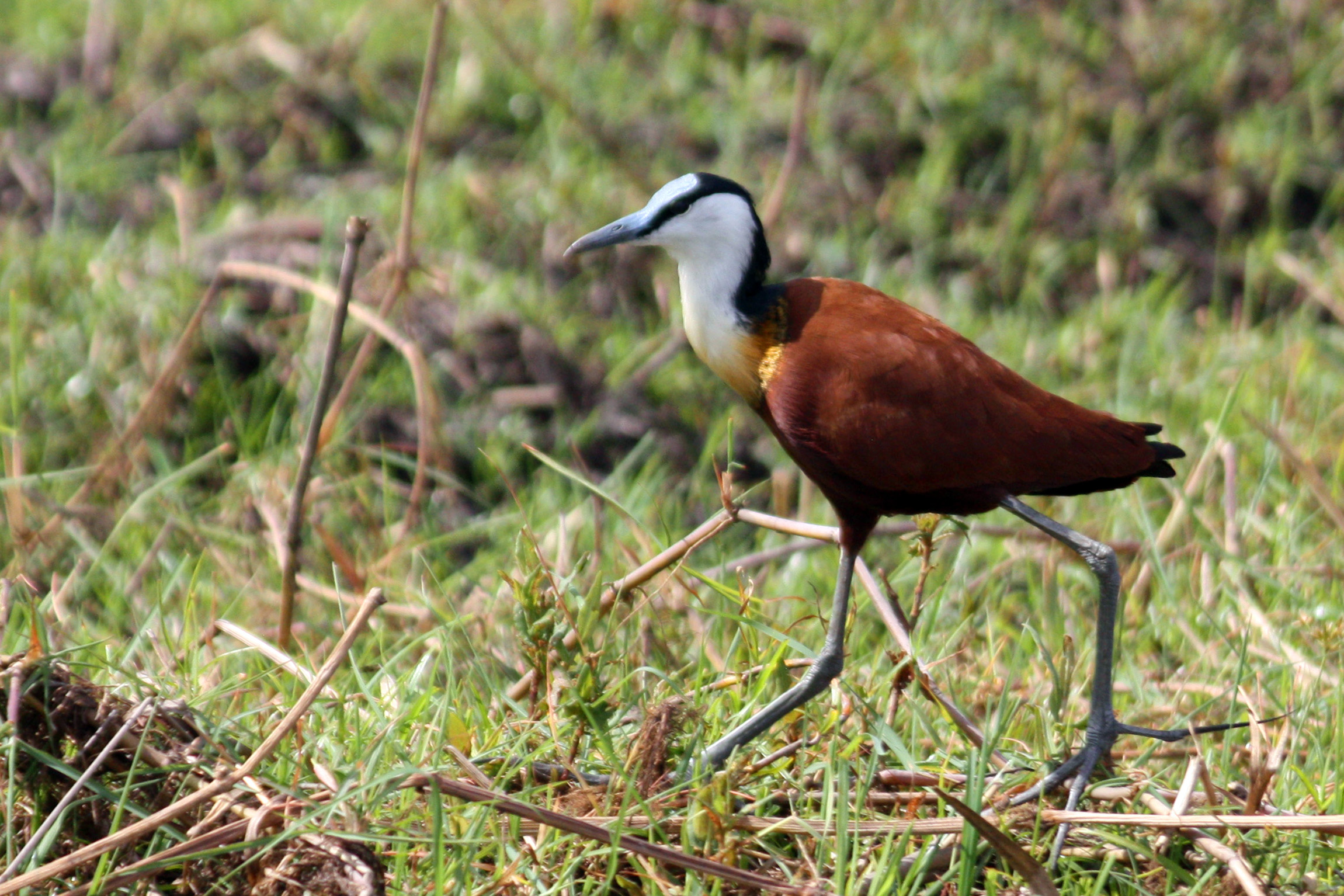
African jacana

The wildlife of Ivory Coast consists of the flora and fauna of this nation in West Africa. The country has a long Atlantic coastline on the Gulf of Guinea and a range of habitat types. Once covered in tropical rainforest, much of this habitat has been cleared, the remaining terrain being gallery forests and savanna with scattered groups of trees, resulting in a decrease in biodiversity. As of 2016, 252 species of mammal had been recorded in Ivory Coast, 666 species of bird, 153 species of reptile, 80 species of amphibian, 671 species of fish and 3660 species of vascular plant.

== Geography ==
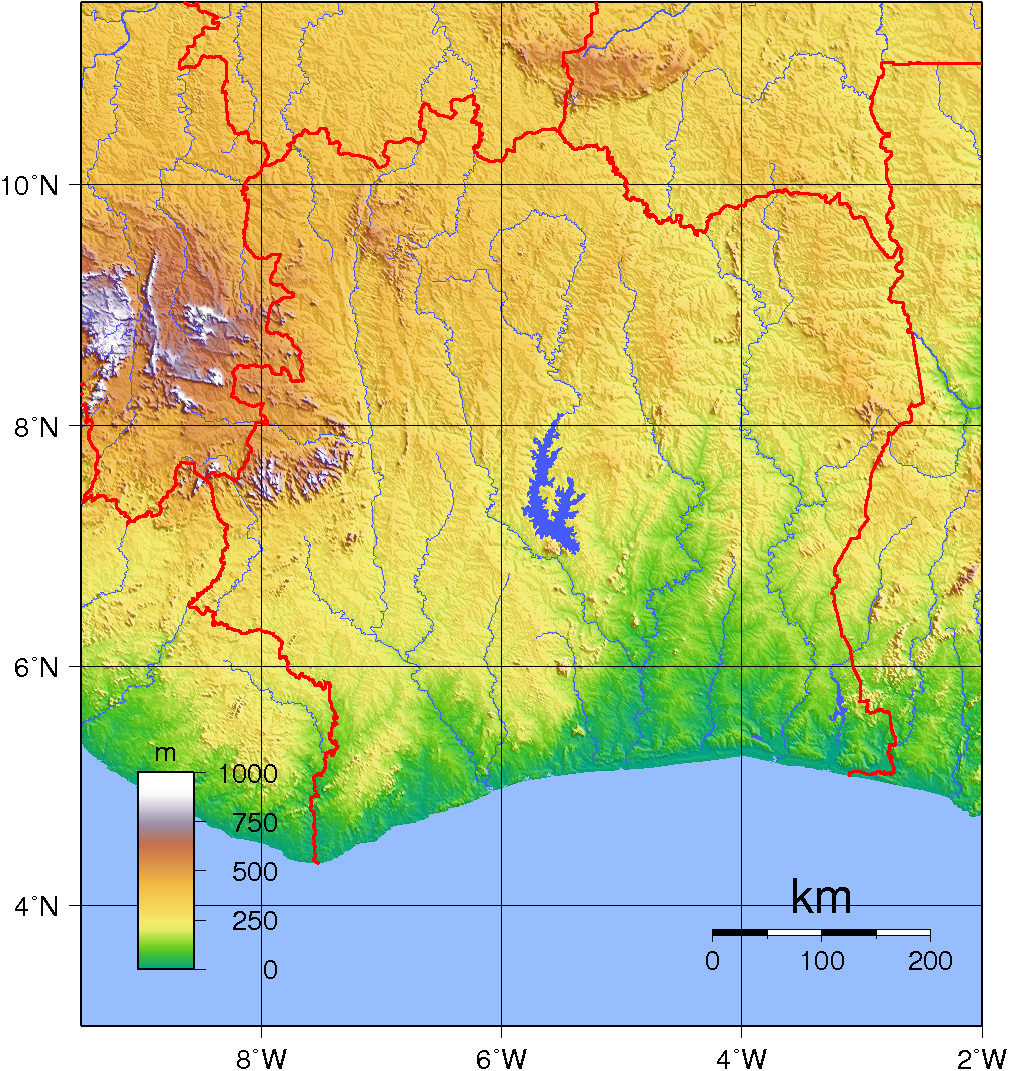
Topography of Ivory Coast, before the creation of Lake Buyo

Ivory Coast is a country in western sub-Saharan Africa just north of the equator, bordered by Liberia and Guinea to the west, Mali and Burkina Faso to the north and Ghana to the east. To the south lies the Gulf of Guinea with a 515 km (320 mi) coastline where there is a network of lagoons. The land rises from south to north, the terrain being mostly flat to undulating plain, with mountains in the west and northwest. The highest point is Mount Richard-Molard on the border with Guinea, reaching 1,752 metres (5,748 ft). The main rivers flow from north to south. A dam on the Bandama River, the longest waterway in the country, has created the artificial Lake Kossou, while another on the Sassandra River has created the rather smaller Lake Buyo.

The forests on mountains in the west of the country near the border with Guinea and Liberia, are classified as Guinean montane forests. The Guinean forest-savanna mosaic belt extends across the middle of the country from east to west, and is the transition zone between the coastal forests and the interior savannas. The forest-savanna mosaic interlaces forest, savanna and grassland habitats. Northern Ivory Coast is part of the Sudanian Savanna ecoregion of the Tropical and subtropical grasslands, savannas, and shrublands biome. It is a zone of lateritic or sandy soils, with vegetation decreasing from south to north. Temperatures average between 25 and 30 °C (77 and 86 °F). The main rainy season is between May and September, with the remaining part of the year being dry in the north of the country, as the Harmattan wind blows. In the south the rainfall is higher (2,000 mm (80 in) annually and twice as much as the north) and some rain falls in most months.

== Flora ==
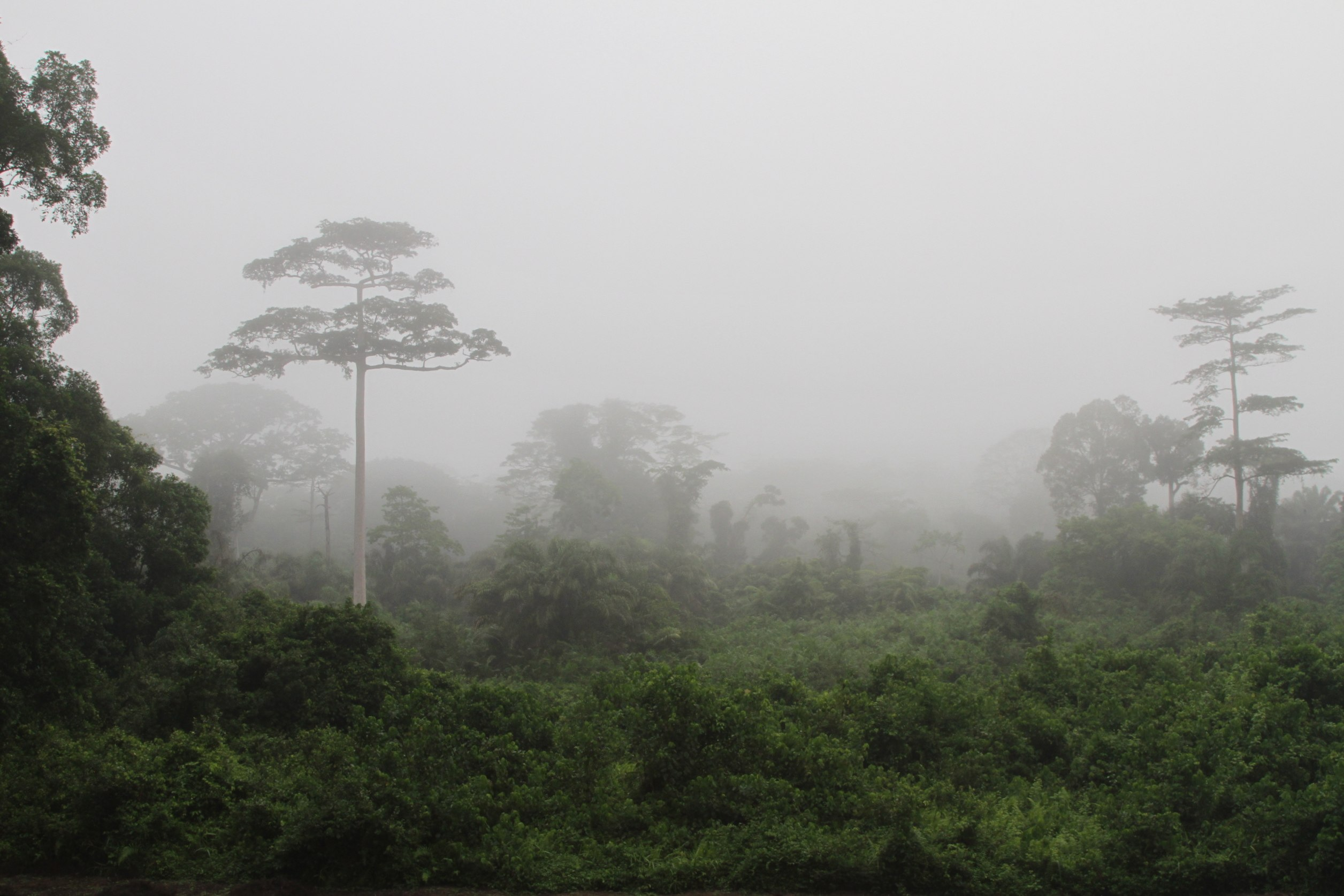
Rainforest with emergent trees in Taï National Park

As of 2016, 3660 species of vascular plant had been recorded in Ivory Coast. The Ébrié Lagoon is dominated by mangroves and herbaceous vegetation including both rooted and floating aquatic plants. Further inland are extensive swamps with larger herbaceous plants and small trees.

In the southwest of the country, the Taï National Park protects the largest area of forest remaining in the Upper Guinean rainforest belt of West Africa. The vegetation is predominantly dense evergreen ombrophilous forest with emergent trees up to 60 m (200 ft) tall, with massive trunks and large buttresses or stilt roots. This mature tropical forest includes some 1,300 species of higher plants and has been designated as a World Heritage Site and a UNESCO Biosphere Reserve. Another area that has been protected is the Comoé National Park, near the border with Burkina Faso. This has a variety of habitats, including gallery forests, woodland, open savannas and wetland.

== Fauna ==
As of 2016, some 252 species of mammal had been recorded in Ivory Coast, 666 species of bird, 153 species of reptile, 80 species of amphibian and 671 species of fish. In the shallow parts of the Ébrié Lagoon there are a range of invertebrates including polychaete worms, nemertean worms, oligochaetes, isopods, amphipods and prawns. Over a hundred species of fish have been recorded here, and the lagoon and surrounding swamps are home to the pygmy hippopotamus, the West African crocodile, the West African slender-snouted crocodile, the dwarf crocodile and the African manatee.

Population growth and civil wars, together with deforestation, the increase area of plantations, hunting for bushmeat and other factors have led to a reduction in diversity among the animals in Ivory Coast, such that many are now restricted to protected areas. Among the 135 species of mammal recorded in Comoé National Park are 11 species of primates including the olive baboon, green monkey, lesser spot-nosed monkey, Mona monkey, black and white colobus, olive colobus, white collared mangabey and western chimpanzee. A total of 17 carnivore species have been observed here, but cheetahs, African wild dogs and lions no longer seem to be present. There are also 21 species of artiodactyl present including hippopotamus, bushpig, bongo, warthog, buffalo, kob, red-flanked duiker, bushbuck, waterbuck, roan antelope and oribi. Mammals recorded in the Taï National Park include the pygmy hippopotamus and 11 species of monkey, as well as African forest elephants, buffaloes, pangolins, bushbuck, leopards, chimpanzees and zebras. Reptiles include crocodiles, lizards and chameleons, as well as snakes such as horned vipers, mambas, and pythons.

Among the 670 species of bird that have been recorded in the country are 10 species of seabird and 119 species of water bird, with the remaining birds being terrestrial. There are no species endemic to the country, but it is visited by 197 species of migratory bird. Some notable birds include 6 species of vulture, raptors, owls, 8 species of stork, African jacana, Ibises, herons, plovers, parrots, 11 species of hornbill, pigeons, and many smaller passerines.
