= Boundiali Biomass Power Station =

Boimass power statation in Ivory Coast

- Boundiali Biomass Power Station
- Country: Ivory Coast
- Location: Boundiali, Boundiali Department, Bagoué Region, Savanes District
- Coordinates: 09°29′31″N 06°30′12″W
- Status: Proposed
- Commission date: 2025 Expected
- Owner: EcoStar Energy Ivory Coast

Thermal power station
- Primary fuel: Biomass

Power generation
- Nameplate capacity: 2 x 12.5MW (25MW)

Boundali Biomass Power Station (BBPS), is a 25 MW (34,000 hp) biomass-fired thermal power plant under development in Ivory Coast. The power station is under development by EcoStar Energy Ivory Coast, the Ivorian subsidiary of EcoStar Energy, a United States-based independent power producer (IPP). The power project received financial facilitation in form of a grant, from the United States Trade and Development Agency (USTDA).

== Location ==
The power plant is under development in the town of Boundiali, in Boundiali Department, Savanes District, Bagoué Region, in northwestern Ivory Coast. Boundiali is located approximately 661 kilometres (411 mi) by road, northwest of Abidjan the economic capital and largest city in the country.

== Overview ==
EcoStar Energy, an American IPP, is developing BBPS in the town of Boundiali, in northwestern Ivory Coast. The design calls for generation capacity of 25 megawatts, to be sold directly to Ivorian electricity utility company, for integrations into the national grid.

The power station will burn agricultural waste from growing cotton, sourced from local Ivorian farmers, to heat water and produce steam. The steam will be used to turn turbines and generate electricity. The power generated will be sold to the Electricity Company of Ivory Coast (Compagnie Ivoirienne d’Électricité) (CIE), under a long-term power purchase agreement (PPA).

== Ownership ==
The Boundiali Biomass Power Station is under development by the company that owns it; EcoStar Energy Côte d'Ivoire (EECI). EECI is a subsidiary of EcoStar Energy Holdings, based in the United States. Using a US$4 million grant awarded by the USTDA, EECI has engaged Delphos International Limited, also based in the United States, to complete the feasibility studies and related pre-construction work.

== Other considerations ==
This power station is intended to help meet Ivory Coast's aim of sourcing 45 percent of its energy needs from renewable sources by 2030. The country has several other biomass power plants in the pipeline, including Divo Biomass Power Station (75 MW) and Ayebo Biomass Power Station (46 MW).

== See also ==
- List of power stations in Ivory Coast
- Divo Biomass Power Station
