= Divo Biomass Power Station =

Power station in Ivory Coast

- Divo Biomass Power Station
- Country: Ivory Coast
- Location: Divo, Divo Department, Gôh-Djiboua District, Lôh-Djiboua Region
- Coordinates: 05°50′49″N 05°18′50″W
- Status: Late development
- Commission date: 2028 Expected
- Construction cost: €235 million (US$273 million)
- Owner: Société des Energies Nouvelles
- Operator: Soden

Thermal power station
- Primary fuel: Biomass

Power generation
- Nameplate capacity: 75 MW (101,000 hp)

Divo Biomass Power Station, also Soden Biomass Power Station, is a c. 75 MW (101,000 hp) biomass-fired thermal power plant under development in Ivory Coast. Société des Energies Nouvelles, an Ivorian IPP is leading the development of this biomass waste-to-energy infrastructure project. The main fuel is intended to be cocoa bean shells, cocoa pod husks and "cocoa sweatings". The U.S. Trade and Development Agency (USTDA) has provided partial funding for this power station.

== Location ==
The power plant is under development in the city of Divo, in Divo Department, Gôh-Djiboua District, in the Lôh-Djiboua Region, in the central southern part of the country. Divo is located approximately 187 kilometres (116 mi), by road, northwest of Abidjan, the capital and largest city in Ivory Coast.

== Overview ==
Ivory Coast is the world's leading producer of cocoa, accounting for more than 40 percent of global production, as of 2021. The cocoa bean is a small component of the cocoa plant. While the bean is transformed into chocolate, confectionery and cocoa drinks, the rest of the fruit is thrown away as waste.

Société des Energies Nouvelles (Soden) (English: New Energy Company), an Ivorian business, is in the process of building a power station with capacity around 75 megawatts, derived from incinerating biomass, primarily cocoa waste. With abundant raw material, other biomass-fired power stations are in the planning stages around the country.

== Ownership ==
The power station is owned and is under development by SODEN, an Ivorian IPP.

== See also ==
- List of power stations in Ivory Coast
- Ayebo Biomass Power Station
- Boundiali Biomass Power Station
- Kakamega Waste To Energy Plant
