= Soubré Hydroelectric Power Station =

Hydroelectric power station in Ivory Coast

Soubré Dam
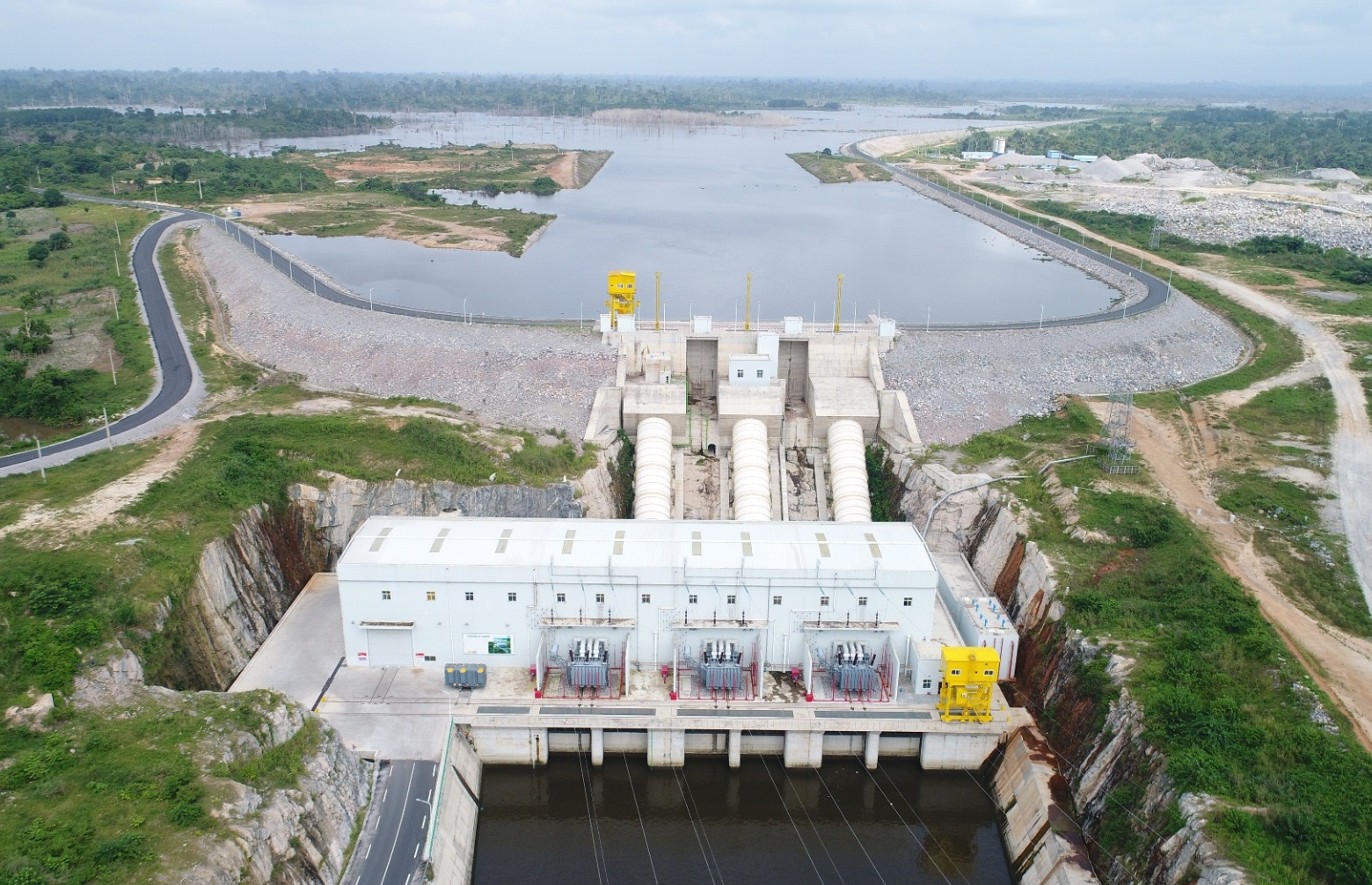

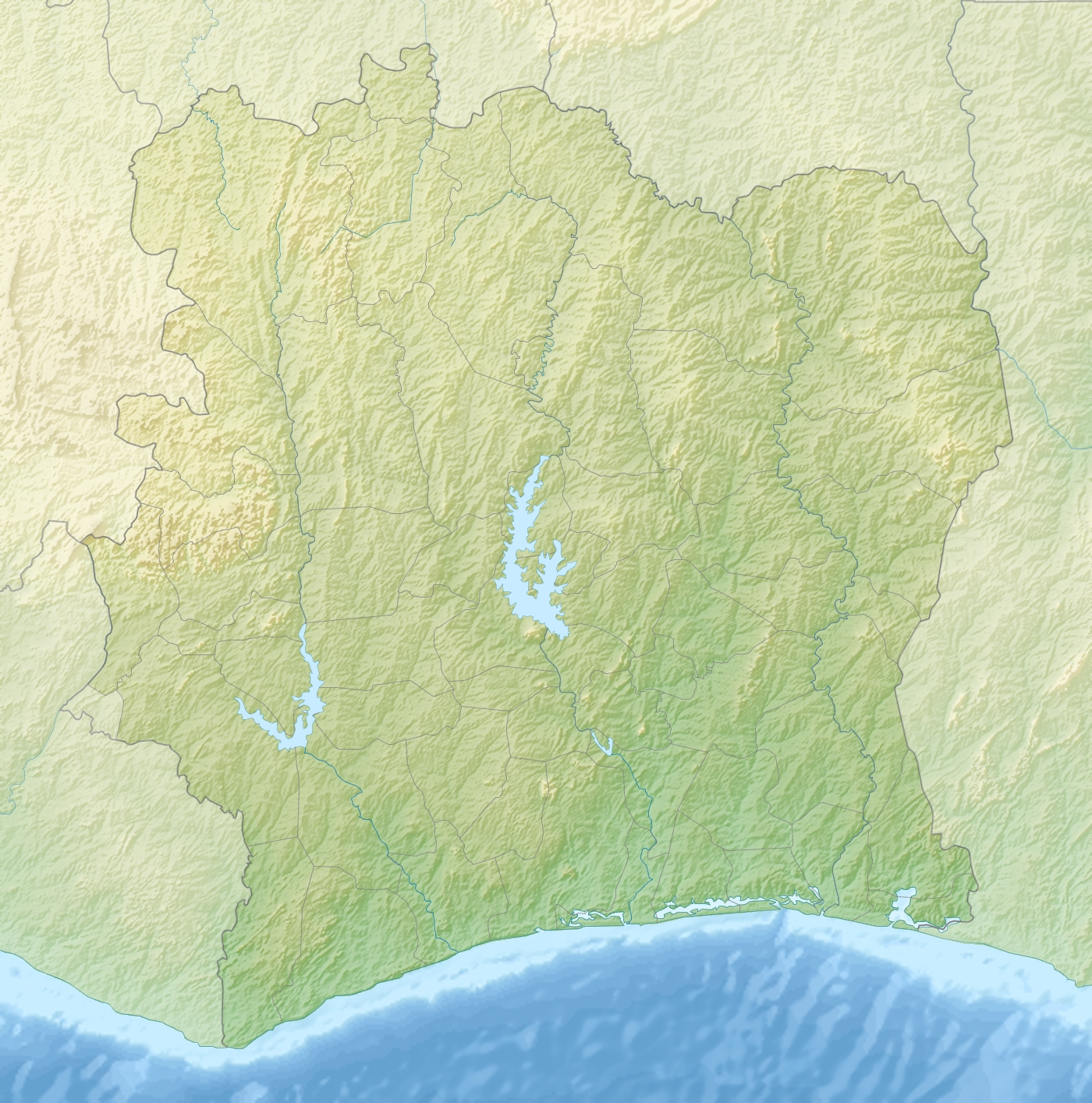
- Location of Soubré HPP; Placement on map is approximate Soubré Dam (Africa) Soubré Dam (Earth)
- Location: Soubré, Ivory Coast
- Coordinates: 05°48′09″N 06°39′21″W
- Construction began: February 2013
- Opening date: November 2017
- Construction cost: €500 million (US$572 million in 2017)

Dam and spillways
- Type of dam: Gravity dam
- Impounds: Victoria Nile

Power Station
- Commission date: 2017
- Turbines: 3 x 90 MW + 1 x 5 MW
- Installed capacity: 275 MW (369,000 hp)
- Annual generation: 1,200 GWh

The Soubré Power Station is a 275 megawatts hydroelectric power station across the Sassandra River, in the Ivory Coast. The station was commissioned on 2 November 2017, after four years of construction. This renewable energy infrastructure is owned and operated by CI Energies, the Ivorian electric utility parastatal company. The dam and power station were funded 85 percent by Exim Bank of China, though a loan and by the Government of Ivory Coast, through 15 percent equity investment. The power station's 1,200 GWh in annual energy production contributed an estimated 10 percent to national generation capacity in 2017. The station was the largest hydroelectric energy source in Ivory Coast, at the time it was commissioned.

== Location ==
The power station lies across the Sassandra River near the city of Soubré, in the Soubré Department of the Nawa Region in the Bas-Sassandra District, in southwestern Ivory Coast. Soubré is located approximately 366 kilometres (227 mi), by road, northwest of Abidjan, the financial capital and largest city in the country. The geographical coordinates of this power station are:05°48'09.0"N, 6°39'21.0"W (Latitude:5.802500; Longitude:-6.655833).

== Overview ==
The power station harnesses a cascade of waterfalls that drop 19 metres (62 ft) over 4.5 kilometres (2.8 mi). The water is directed over three groups of Francis type turbines, each rated at 90 MW. A 5 MW generator is also inserted in the instream flow, for an extra boost to the output. The power station generates a calculated annual output in excess of 1,200 GWh.

Other infrastructure installations related to this power house include (a) a spillway, with waterflow at 5,500 cubic meters (5,500,000 L) per second (b) an outflow canal measuring 2.5 kilometres (2 mi) in length (c) a switchyard (d) a 225kiloVolt evacuation power line measuring 380 kilometres (236 mi) from Soubré to Abidjan and (e) a bridge capable of carrying two-way motorised traffic.

== Ownership ==
The power station is owned by the government of ivory Coast, through its wholly owned public electricity utility company CI-Energies.

== Construction costs and funding ==
The cost of construction is reported as €500 million in 2017 money. Exim Bank of China lent 85 percent of the cost and the Ivorian government contributed 15 percent of the cost as equity investment. The engineering, procurement and construction (EPC) contract was awarded to Sinohydro, under a build–own–operate–transfer (BOOT) arrangement, where Sinohydro came up with the construction money upfront and was paid a lump sum at closing, when the project was operational. Sinohydro is a subsidiary of PowerChina. The owner's engineer was Tractebel-Engie of France.

== Other considerations ==
In December 2018, the Ivorian government reported that they had connected 60 new villages to the energy generated at Soubré Hydroelectric Power Station. Using €137.82 million borrowed from the African Development Bank, the authorities plan to transmit power to the cities of Duékoué, San Pedro and Zagné. Through those cities, a total of 252 rural localities in Montagnes District are expected to receive grid electricity for the first time.

== See also ==
- List of power stations in Ivory Coast
- Gribo–Popoli Hydroelectric Power Station
