= Gribo–Popoli Hydroelectric Power Station =

Power station in Ivory Coast

Gribo–Popoli Dam
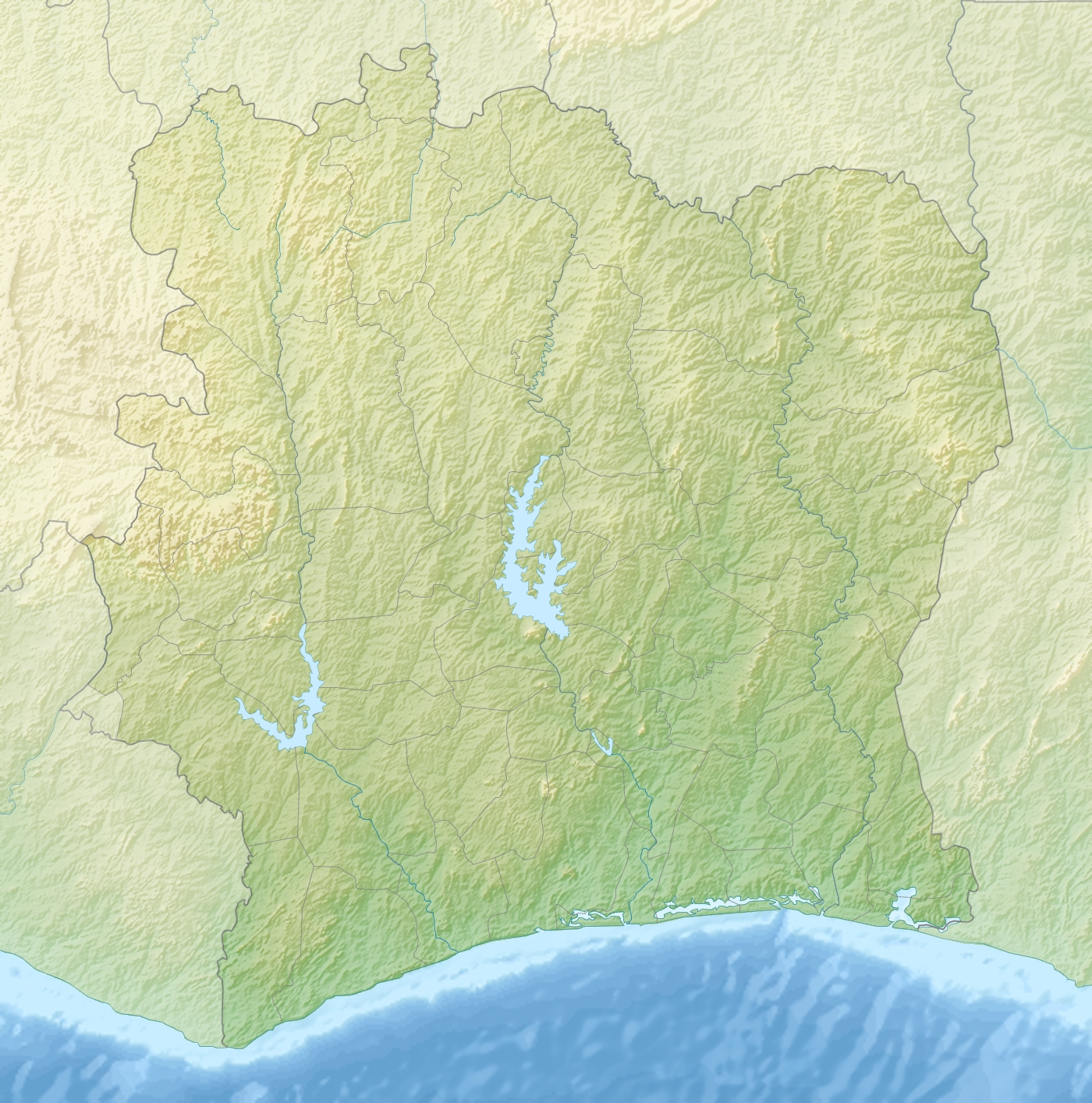
- Location of Gribo–Popoli Dam; Placement on map is approximate Gribo–Popoli Dam (Africa) Gribo–Popoli Dam (Earth)
- Location: Ivory Coast
- Coordinates: 05°41′53″N 06°34′17″W
- Construction began: 2021
- Opening date: 2024
- Construction cost: US$308 million

Dam and spillways
- Type of dam: Gravity dam
- Impounds: Sassandra River

Power Station
- Commission date: 2024
- Installed capacity: 112 MW (150,000 hp)
- Annual generation: 580 GWh

The Gribo–Popoli Power Station, also Gribo Popoli Power Station, is a hydroelectric power station under construction across the Sassandra River, in Ivory Coast. This renewable energy power station is owned and is under development by the Government of Ivory Coast, through its wholly owned subsidiary, CI-Energies, the national electricity utility parastatal company.

With partial funding from the Exim Bank of China, the engineering, procurement and construction (EPC) contract was awarded to Sinohydro, the Chinese hydropower engineering and construction company. CI-Energies is the expected off-taker of the energy generated here. Construction is reported to have started in 2021, with commissioning anticipated in 2024.

== Location ==
The power station lies across the Sassandra River, about 15 kilometres (9 mi) downstream of Soubré Hydroelectric Power Station, outside the city of Soubré. Soubré is located in the Soubré Department of the Nawa Region in the Bas-Sassandra District, in southwestern Ivory Coast. This is approximately 366 kilometres (227 mi), by road, northwest of Abidjan, the financial capital and largest city in the country.

== Overview ==
This power station is one of three hydroelectric power stations on the Sassandra River, downstream of the Soubré Hydroelectric Power Station. These three dams, when completed, are expected to add a total of 508 MW to the national generation capacity, according to the Ivorian authorities. The dams are Gribo-Popoli HPP: 112 megawatts, Boutoubré HPP: 150 megawatts and Louga HPP: 246 megawatts.

The work at this site includes: (a) building an earth filled dam measuring 4,000 metres (13,000 ft) in length (b) six spillway gates (c) an above-ground powerhouse with a total installed capacity of 112 MW (d) a 225kiloVolt switchyard (e) two 8 kilometres (5 mi) overhead (single circuit) high voltage evacuation transmission lines connecting this power station to the 225kV Soubré–San Pedro high voltage power line (f) 23 kilometres (14 mi) of permanent access roads.

== Construction costs and funding ==
The estimated cost for the dam and power plant is reported as US$308 million. The Exim Bank of China has lent US$287 million, with the balance contributed by the Ivorian government as equity investment. The table below lays out this information in tabular form.

Sources of Funding of Gribo-Popoli Hydropower Station
Rank	Funding Source	Amount (USD)	Percentage	Notes
1	Exim Bank of China	287.0	93.2	
2	Government of Ivory Coast	21.0	6.8	
	Total	308	100.0	

== Other considerations ==
This power station will increase the national generation capacity by 112 MW of clean energy and will help to propel the county towards 6 Gigawatts of installed capacity by 2030, that the Ivorian government is aiming at.

== See also ==
- List of power stations in Ivory Coast
