= Sokhoro Solar Power Station =

Solar park in Ivory Coast

- Country: Ivory Coast
- Location: Sokhoro, Tchologo Region, Savanes District
- Coordinates: 09°31′47″N 05°13′26″W
- Status: Proposed
- Construction began: Q2 2024 Expected
- Commission date: Q4 2025 Expected
- Construction cost: €60.2 million
- Owner: PFO Africa
- Operator: Ferké Solar

Solar farm
- Type: Flat-panel PV

Power generation
- Nameplate capacity: 52 MW (70,000 hp)

The Sokhoro Solar Power Station is a planned 52 MW (70,000 hp) solar power plant in Ivory Coast. The solar farm is under development by PFO Africa, an Ivorian subsidiary of the French conglomerate, PFO Energies. When completed, it will be the largest grid-connected solar power station in the country.

== Location ==
The power station is located in the village of Sokhoro, in the Ferkessédougou Department of the Tchologo Region, in the Savanes District, in the extreme north of Ivory Coast.

Sokhoro is located approximately 8 kilometres (5.0 mi) by road south of Ferkessédougou, the nearest large urban center. This is about 60 kilometres (37 mi) northeast of the city of Korhogo, the headquarters of Savanes District.

== Overview ==
The design calls for a ground-mounted photovoltaic solar power plant with generation capacity of 52 me gawatts. PFO Africa, the concessionaire, has formed a 100 percent special purpose vehicle company (SPV) to own, develop, finance, build, operate and maintain this power station. The SPV, called "Ferké Solar", has signed a power purchase agreement (PPA) with the relevant Ivorian entity to supply electricity for 25 years from the day of commercial commissioning. The estimated 90 GWh of annual power production is expected to serve over 370,000 customers.

== Developers ==
The power station is under development PFO Africa, an Ivorian independent power producer (IPP), that is a subsidiary of PFO Energies, a French energy conglomerate.

== Construction costs, funding, and commissioning ==
The construction costs are reported as €60.2 million. Construction is expected to start in H1 2024 and conclude in H2 2025.

== See also ==
- List of power stations in Ivory Coast
- Boundiali Solar Power Station
