= Attoutou =

Attoutou Attoutou A
- Town and sub-prefecture
- Location in Ivory Coast
- Coordinates: 5°13′N 4°34′W
- Country: Ivory Coast
- District: Lagunes
- Region: Grands-Ponts
- Department: Jacqueville

Population (2014)
  - Total: 24,020
- Time zone: UTC+0 (GMT)

Attoutou is a town in southern Ivory Coast. It is a sub-prefecture of Jacqueville Department in Grands-Ponts Region, Lagunes District. The town is on the south coast of Ébrié Lagoon.

The town—but not the sub-prefecture—is sometimes referred to as Attoutou A.

Attoutou was a commune until March 2012, when it became one of 1,126 communes nationwide that were abolished.

The Attoutou sub-prefecture also contains the town Taboth.

In 2014, the population of the sub-prefecture of Attoutou was 24,020.

== Villages ==
The 16 villages of the sub-prefecture of Attoutou and their populations in 2014 are:

1. Abraco (555)
2. Abraniamiambo (355)
3. Allaba (1,850)
4. Attoutou A (1,102)
5. Attoutou B (1,087)
6. Bapo (622)
7. Gboyo (1,612)
8. Irobo (4,649)
9. Koko (653)
10. Kouassikro (2,124)
11. Nigui-Assoko (1,854)
12. Nigui-Saff (2,439)
13. Taboth (801)
14. Tefredji (751)
15. Tiagba (3,114)
16. Tiemien (452)
