= Ayebo Biomass Power Station =

Biomass power station in Ivory Coast

- Ayebo Biomass Power Station
- Country: Ivory Coast
- Location: Ayebo, Aboisso Department, Comoé District, Sud-Comoé Region
- Coordinates: 05°26′22″N 03°16′09″W
- Status: Under construction
- Commission date: 2024 Expected
- Construction cost: €237 million (US$263.9 million)
- Owner: Biovéa Énergie SA

Thermal power station
- Primary fuel: Biomass

Power generation
- Nameplate capacity: 2 x 23 MW = 46 MW (62,000 hp)
- Capacity factor: 337 GWh

Ayebo Biomass Power Station, also Biovéa Biomass Power Station, is a 46 MW (62,000 hp) biomass-fired thermal power plant under development in Ivory Coast. Biovéa Énergie SA, a special purpose vehicle company, has been awarded the concession contract to design, finance, construct, operate and maintain the power station. As raw material, the power station is designed to use palm oil waste.

== Location ==
The power plant is under construction in the village of Ayebo, in Aboisso Department, Comoé District, Sud-Comoé Region, in southeastern Ivory Coast. Ayebo is located approximately 290 kilometres (180 mi), by road, south of Abengourou, the district capital. This is about 108 kilometres (67 mi), by road, northeast of Abidjan, the capital and largest city in the country.

== Overview ==
In January 2020, the development contract was awarded to (a) Électricité de France (EDF), the national electricity utility of France (b) Meridiam, a French public infrastructure financier and (c) Biokala SA., an "Ivorian biomass producer", a subsidiary of the Sifca Group.

The power station will burn palm oil waste, sourced from 12,000 Ivorian farmers, to heat water and produce steam. The steam will be used to turn turbines and generate electricity. The power generated will be sold to the Electricity Company of Ivory Coast (Compagnie Ivoirienne d’Électricité) (CIE), under a 25-year power purchase agreement.

== Ownership ==
The Ayebo biomass power plant is under development by the consortium that owns it. The owners formed a special purpose vehicle that owns and plans to operate and maintain the power station after completion. That company is called Biovéa Énergie SA. The table below illustrates the shareholding in Biovéa Énergie SA.

Shareholding in Biovéa Énergie SA.
Rank	Shareholder	Domicile	Percentage	Notes
1	Électricité de France	France	40.00	
2	Meridiam	France	36.00	
3	Biokala SA	Ivory Coast	24.00	
	Total		100.00	

== Construction costs and timeline ==
The total cost for the power plant is estimated at US$223 million. Proparco, the subsidiary of the French Development Agency (AFD), FMO (Netherlands) and Société Générale have jointly lent €90 million (approximately US$110 million), towards this project.

Électricité de France was assigned the engineering, procurement, and construction function. Meridiam was assigned the financial role, while Biokala is responsible for the supply chain of the palm oil waste. Construction was expected to start in 2020, with commercial commissioning in 2023.

In March 2022, Afrik21.africa reported that earthworks at the construction site had started on 24 February 2022, with completion anticipated in 2023. In August 2022, Biovea Energie, the special purpose vehicle company contracted China Energy Engineering Corporation (CEEC) to build the plant. Completion is expected in 2024.

== Associated benefits ==
As a byproduct, the plant will produce ash that is rich in potassium, to be used as fertilizer by the farmers, increasing yields of palm oil and other food crops. The power station will consume an estimated 476,000 tonnes of palm oil waste annually to generate 337 giga-watt hours (GWH), every year, foregoing the emission of 1.6 million tonnes of carbon dioxide (CO_{2}) annually. During the construction phase, an estimated 500 jobs are expected to be created and about 1,000 jobs will come to life when the plant achieves commercial commissioning.

== Developments ==
In July 2023, Afrik21 and ESI-Africa reported that the project had reached financial close. The Emerging Africa Infrastructure Fund (EAIF), a subsidiary of the Private Infrastructure Development Group (PIDG) approved a loan of €35 million (US$38.9 million) towards the construction of this power station. In addition, PIDG itself will provide an €8 million (US$8.9 million) grant to fund what is referred to as a "Viability Funding Gap". This is in addition to funding by Proparco and FMO Netherlands. Completion and commercial commissioning are expected in 2024.

== See also ==
- List of power stations in Ivory Coast
- Divo Biomass Power Station
