= Boundiali Solar Power Station =

Solar farm in Ivory Coast

- Country: Ivory Coast
- Location: Boundiali, Boundiali Department, Bagoué Region, Savanes District
- Coordinates: 09°34′07″N 06°28′36″W
- Status: Operational
- Construction began: July 2022
- Commission date: July 2023
- Construction cost: €40 million
- Owner: Boundiali Solar North Limited

Solar farm
- Type: Flat-panel PV
- Site area: 38 hectares (94 acres)

Power generation
- Units operational: 69,440 550
- Nameplate capacity: 37.5 megawatts (50,300 hp)
- Annual net output: 64GWh

The Boundiali Solar Power Station, is a 37.5 megawatts (50,300 hp) solar power plant in Ivory Coast, the largest economy in the Francophone West Africa zone.

== Location ==
The power station is located near the town of Boundiali, in Boundiali Department, Bagoué Region, Savanes District, approximately 102.5 kilometres (64 mi), by road, west of the city of Korhogo, the district headquarters. Boundiali is located approximately 660 kilometres (410 mi), by road, northwest of the city of Abidjan, the national capital.

== Overview ==
The power station has a capacity of 37.5 megawatts, sold directly to the state-owned Ivorian electricity utility company, Société de Gestion du Patrimoine du Secteur de l'Electricité (SOGEPE), for integration in the national electricity grid. The electricity is evacuated via a substation near the power station. The energy generated will power approximately 30,000 homes. In addition to supplying the country with 37.5 megawatts of clean energy, the power station will enable Ivory Coast avoid the emission of 27,000 tonnes of carbon dioxide annually. Up to 300 construction jobs were created during the construction phase.

== Developers ==
The power station was developed by the government of Ivory Coast, with financial backing from the European Union and the German Investment and Development Bank (KfW).

== Construction ==
The engineering, procurement and construction (EPC) contract was awarded to Eiffage Énergie Systèmes, a subsidiary of the French Eiffage Group. To mitigate the lack of sunshine at night, the developers of this solar farm decided to install a 10MW/13.8MWh lithium battery energy storage system (BESS). Eiffage Énergie Systèmes has selected Saft, a subsidiary of TotalEnergies, to design and install the BESS, in six containers on site.

== Construction costs and funding ==
The cost of construction was budgeted at €40 million. The table below illustrates the sources of funding for this power plant.

Sources of Funding For Boundiali Solar Power Station
Rank	Source	Euros (Millions)	Percentage	Notes
1	KfW	27.0	67.50	Loan
2	European Union	9.7	24.25	Grant
3	Government of Ivory Coast	3.3	8.25	Equity
	Total	40.0	100.00	

== See also ==
- List of power stations in Ivory Coast
- Sokhoro Solar Power Station
