= Taboth =

- Village
- Location in Ivory Coast
- Coordinates: 5°15′N 4°20′W
- Country: Ivory Coast
- District: Lagunes
- Region: Grands-Ponts
- Department: Jacqueville
- Sub-prefecture: Attoutou
- Time zone: UTC+0 (GMT)

Taboth is a village in southern Ivory Coast. It is in the sub-prefecture of Attoutou, Jacqueville Department, Grands-Ponts Region, Lagunes District. The village is on the south shore of Ébrié Lagoon.

Taboth was a commune until March 2012, when it became one of 1,126 communes nationwide that were abolished.
