= Lake Kossou =

Reservoir in Ivory Coast

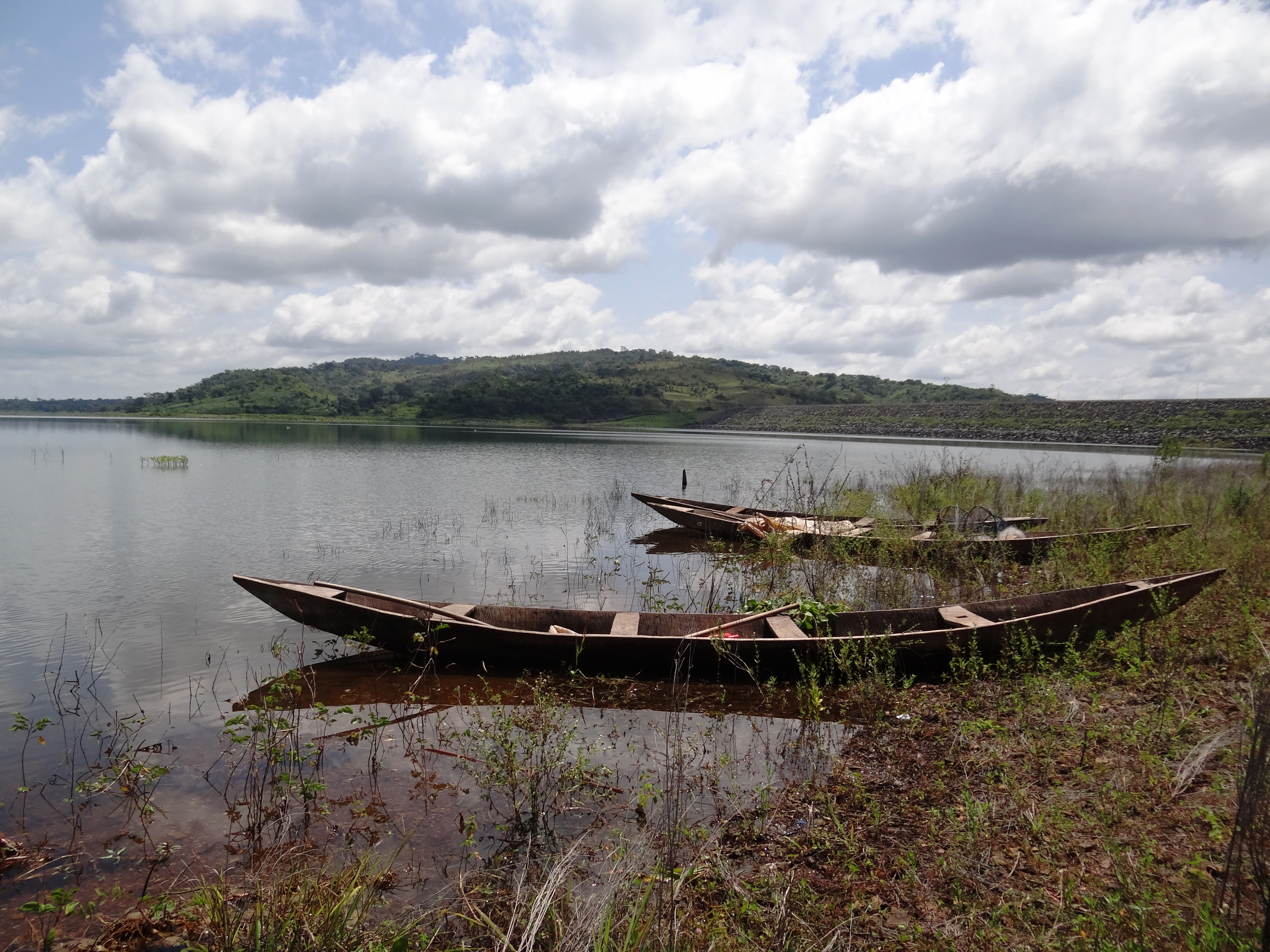

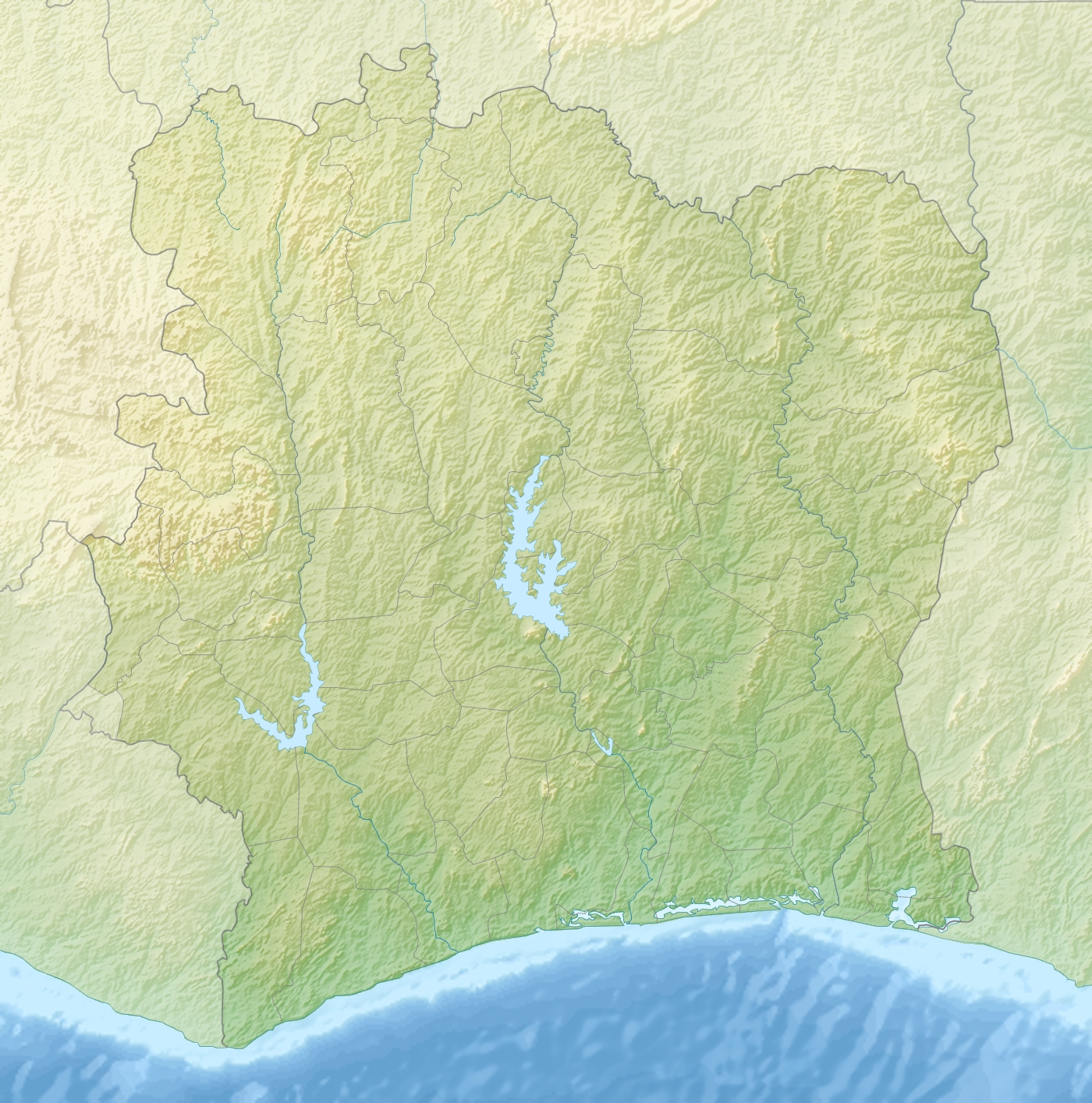
- Location within Ivory Coast
- Coordinates: 07°09′00″N 05°35′24″W
- Primary inflows: Bandama River
- Primary outflows: Bandama River
- Basin countries: Côte d'Ivoire
- Max. width: 45 km (28 mi)

Lake Kossou (French: Lac de Kossou) is Côte d'Ivoire's largest lake. It lies on the Bandama River in the center of the country. It is an artificial lake, created in 1973 by damming the Bandama River at Kossou (the Kossou Dam). Some 75,000 Baoulé people were displaced by the lake.

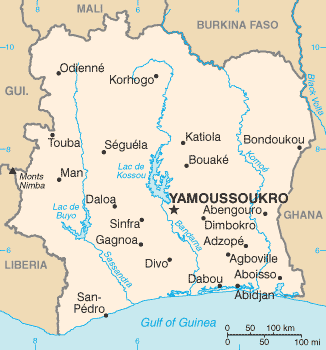
Map of Côte d'Ivoire showing the centrally located Lake Kossou

== History ==
Lake Kossou was formed after construction of the Kossou Dam across the Bandama River which was completed in 1973. The Kossou Dam Project was completed under the auspices of the United Nations Development Programme, the agency involved being the Authorite de Valle du Bandama (ADV). It involved relocating about 75,000 people from 200 settlements, into 54 new villages which were built by ADV, 32 in the forest zone and 22 in the savanna zone. 22,000 people were resettled before water started to be impounded in 1971.

The dam is constructed of earth with rockfill, and is about 1,500 m (5,000 ft) long. The impounded water powers a hydroelectric power plant with a capacity of 174 megawatts. When full, the lake will have a surface some 206 m (676 ft) above sea level, a length of 180 km (112 mi) and a width of 45 km (28 mi), an area of 1,855 km^{2} (716 mi^{2}) and a capacity of 28.8×10^{9} m^{3} (1.017×10^{12} ft^{3}).

Besides the generation of power, the creation of the lake was intended to encourage the local population to remain in the area and use the water for irrigating their crops, and it was also hoped that a fishing industry would develop. In 1975 the lake reached its greatest height above sea level of 193 m (633 ft), at which point its surface area was about 50% of its full potential. By 1994 it had not enlarged further due to a decrease in rainfall in its catchment area, and some extraction of water through dikes upstream.

Rainfall in the catchment area continued to be lower than the long term average, and the surface area of the lake remained at about 50% of what had been expected; many dispossessed farmers who had been relocated claimed back their land. In 1983, a serious drought and extensive wildfires devastated the crops and the coffee and cacao plantations near the lake, causing great economic loss.

In 2019, a project to create a floating solar photovoltaic scheme on the surface of the lake was being considered. It would have an installed capacity of between 10 and 20 megawatts.

== Wildlife ==
An early feature of the lake was the development of large populations of the invasive water cabbage (Pistia stratiotes) on the surface of the water. There are hippopotamuses and other aquatic animals at the lake, and an increasing number of birds have been recorded being resident here or visiting the area.

Before the dam was constructed, the dominant fish species found in the river had been Labeo coubie and Alestes rutilus, with Tilapia zillii being found in quiet backwaters. By 1975, species caught in the lake included the Nile perch (Lates niloticus), Distichodus rostratus, Alestes baremoze, Brycinus nurse, Labeo senegalensis, Pellonula afzeliusi, the African butter catfish (Schilbe mystus) and the mudfish (Clarias anguillaris).
