= Kossou Dam =

Dam in Ivory Coast

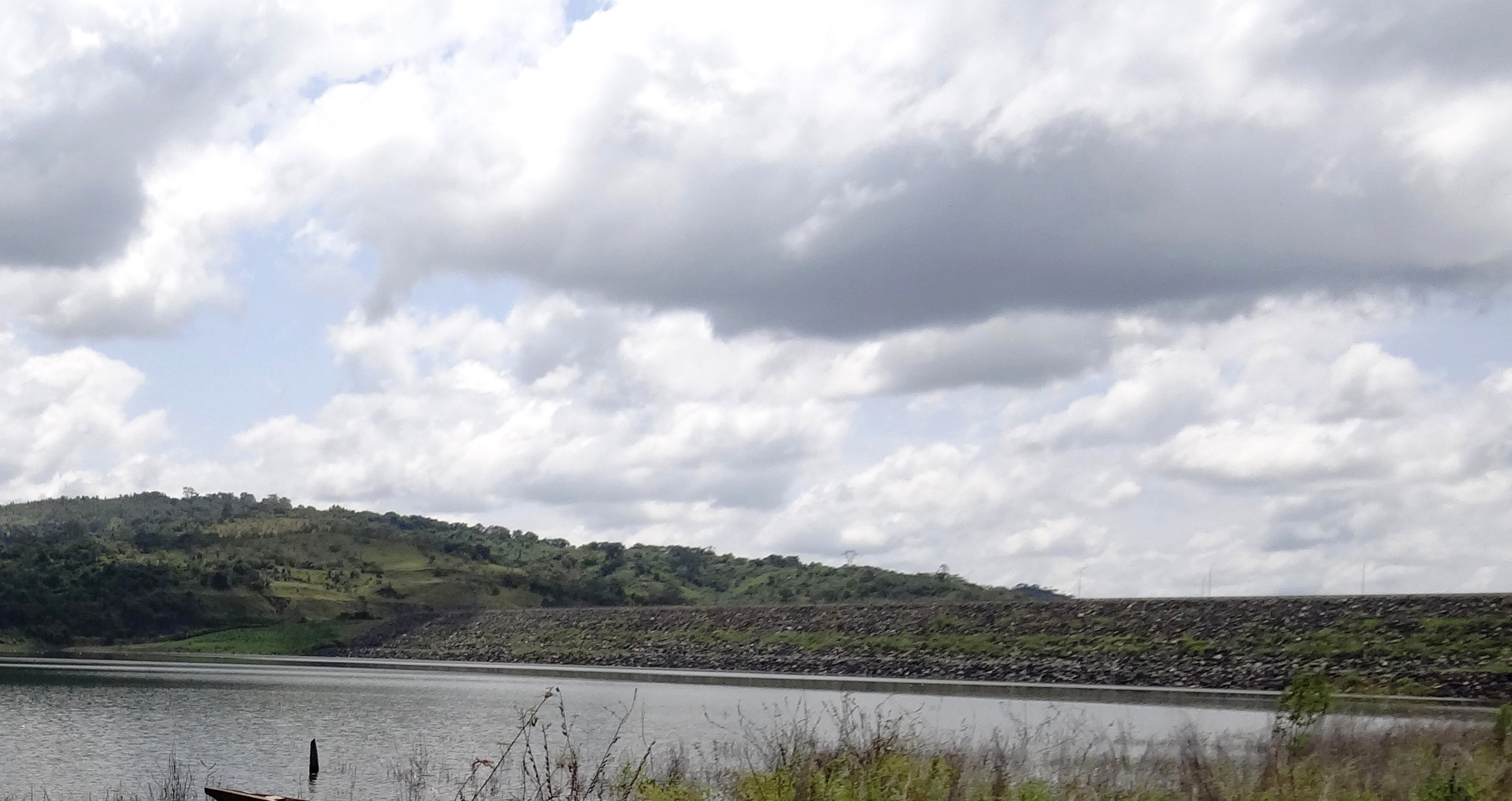

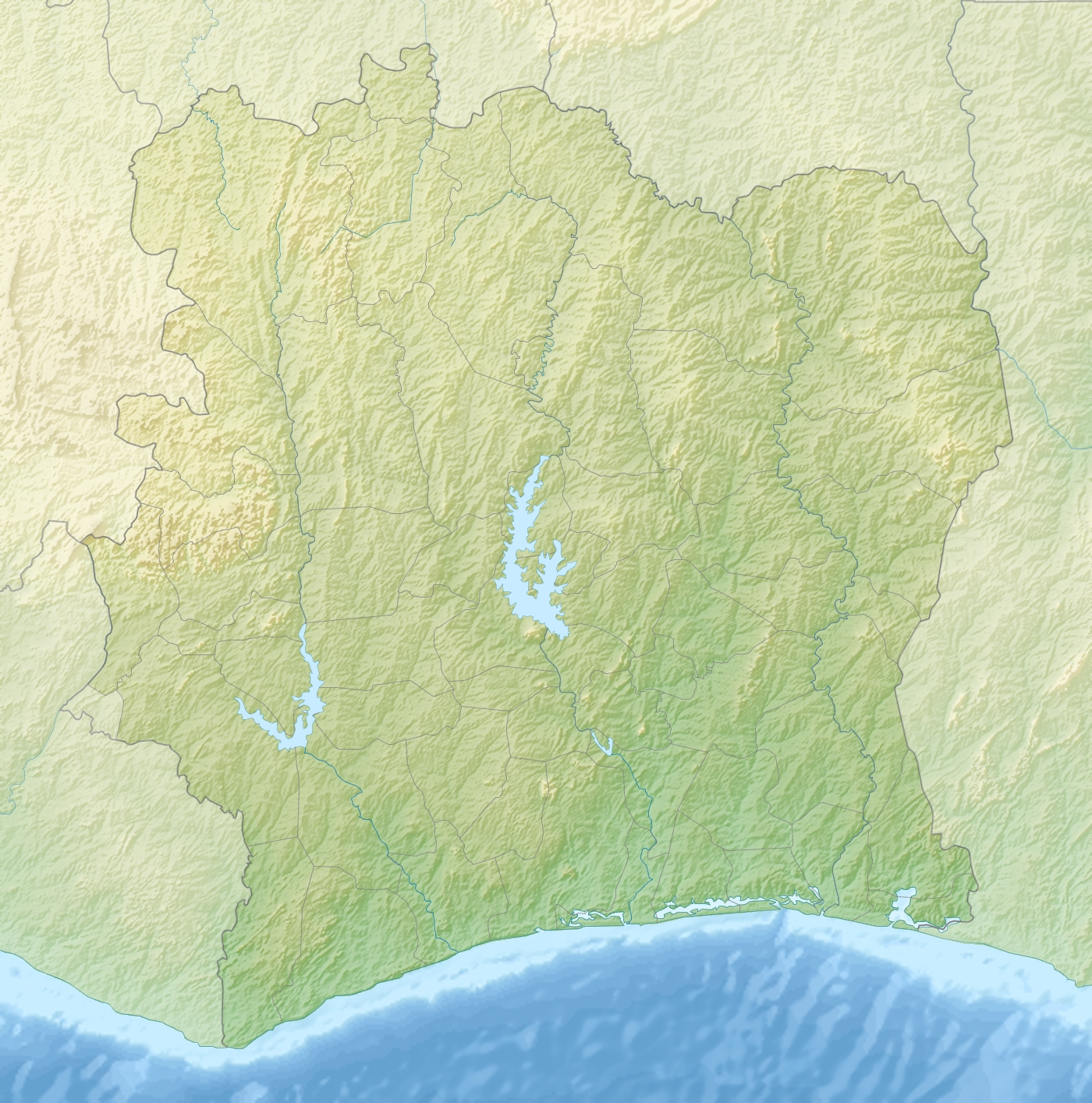
- Location within Ivory Coast
- Country: Ivory Coast
- Location: Yamoussoukro
- Coordinates: 07°01′52″N 5°28′24″W
- Purpose: Power
- Status: Operational
- Opening date: 1972; 54 years ago
- Owner: Ministry of Economy

Dam and spillways
- Type of dam: Embankment, earth and rock-fill
- Impounds: Bandama River
- Height: 58 m (190 ft)
- Length: 1,500 m (4,900 ft)

Reservoir
- Creates: Lake Kossou
- Total capacity: 27,675×10^{6} m^{3} (22,436,000 acre⋅ft)
- Surface area: 178 km^{2} (69 sq mi)

Power Station
- Commission date: 1972-1973
- Turbines: 3 x 58 MW (78,000 hp) Francis-type
- Installed capacity: 174 MW (233,000 hp)

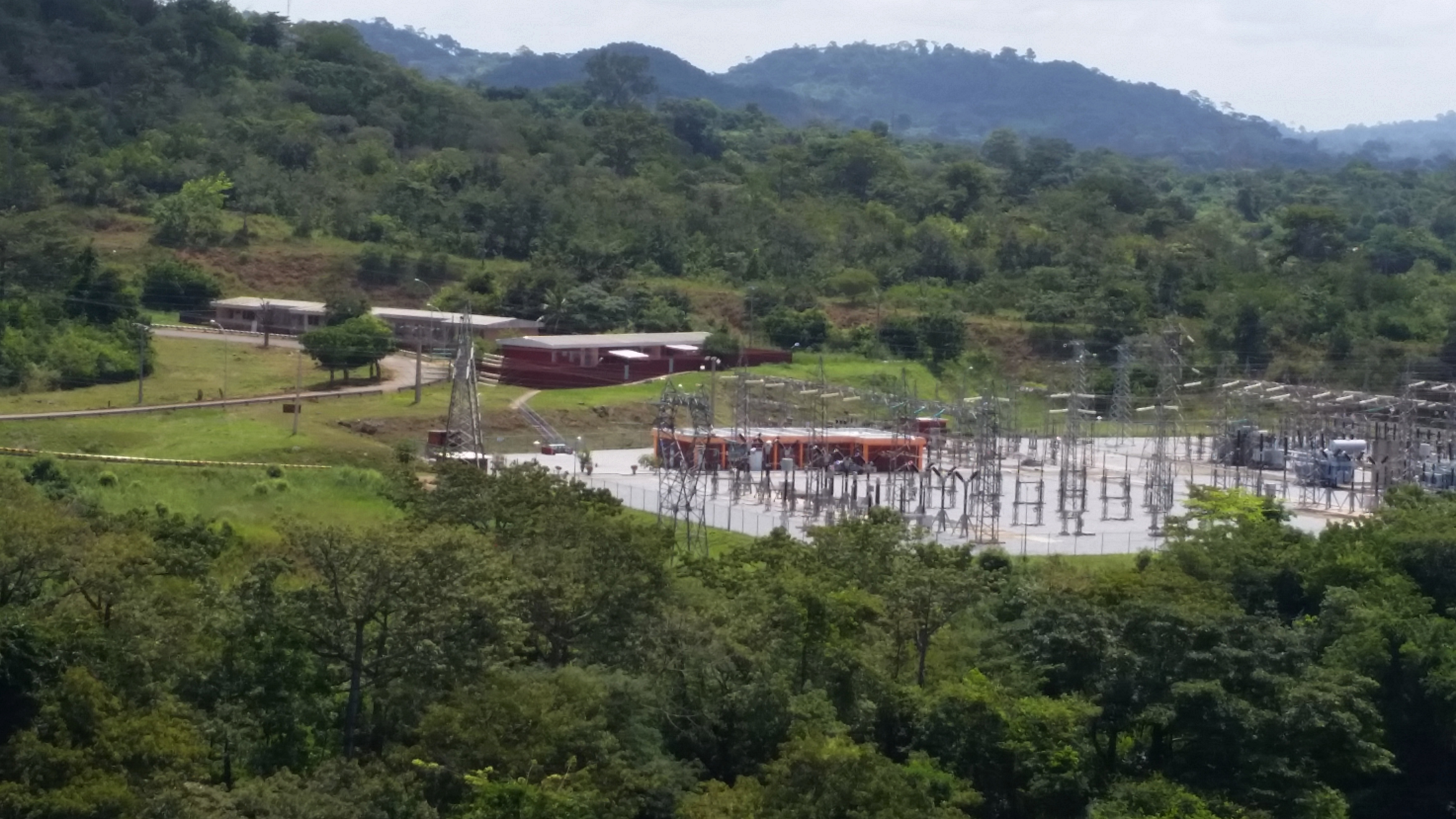
Kossou dam power plant

The Kossou Dam is an embankment dam that impounds the Bandama River about 32 kilometres (20 mi) northwest of Yamoussoukro in Côte d'Ivoire. It has a power generating capacity of 174 megawatts (233,000 hp), enough to power over 118,000 homes. The dam impounds the largest lake in Côte d'Ivoire, Lake Kossou.

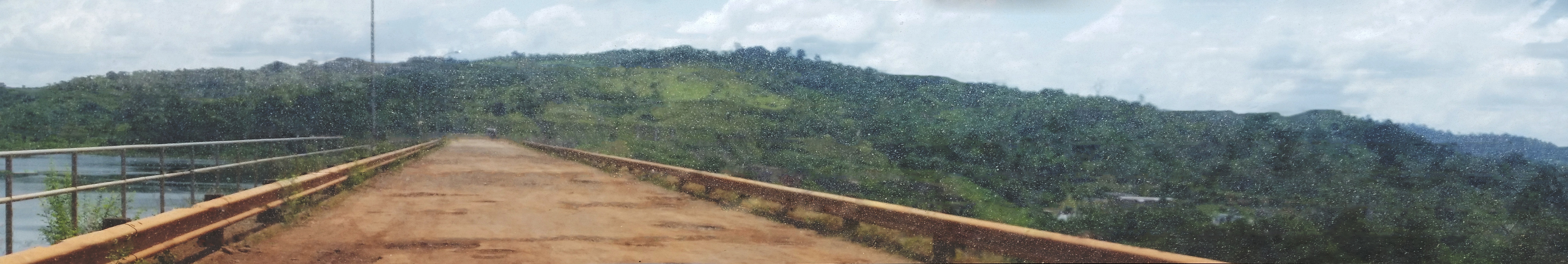
Kossou dam
