= Bandama River =

Longest river in Ivory Coast

Coordinates: 5°08′18″N 4°59′47″W

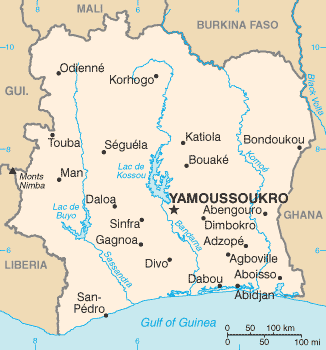
Map of Côte d'Ivoire showing the Bandama River in the center of the country

The Bandama River is the longest river in Ivory Coast with a length of some 800 kilometers. The south-flowing river is fed by the Marahoué, Solomougou, Kan and Nzi rivers and empties into the Tagba Lagoon and the Gulf of Guinea.

The Bandama flows through Lake Kossou, a large artificial lake created in 1973 by the construction of the Kossou Dam at Kossou.

Yamoussoukro, the capital of Ivory Coast, is located adjacent to the Bandama River.

The Rallye Côte d'Ivoire is often hosted around the Bandama.
