= List of rivers of Ivory Coast =

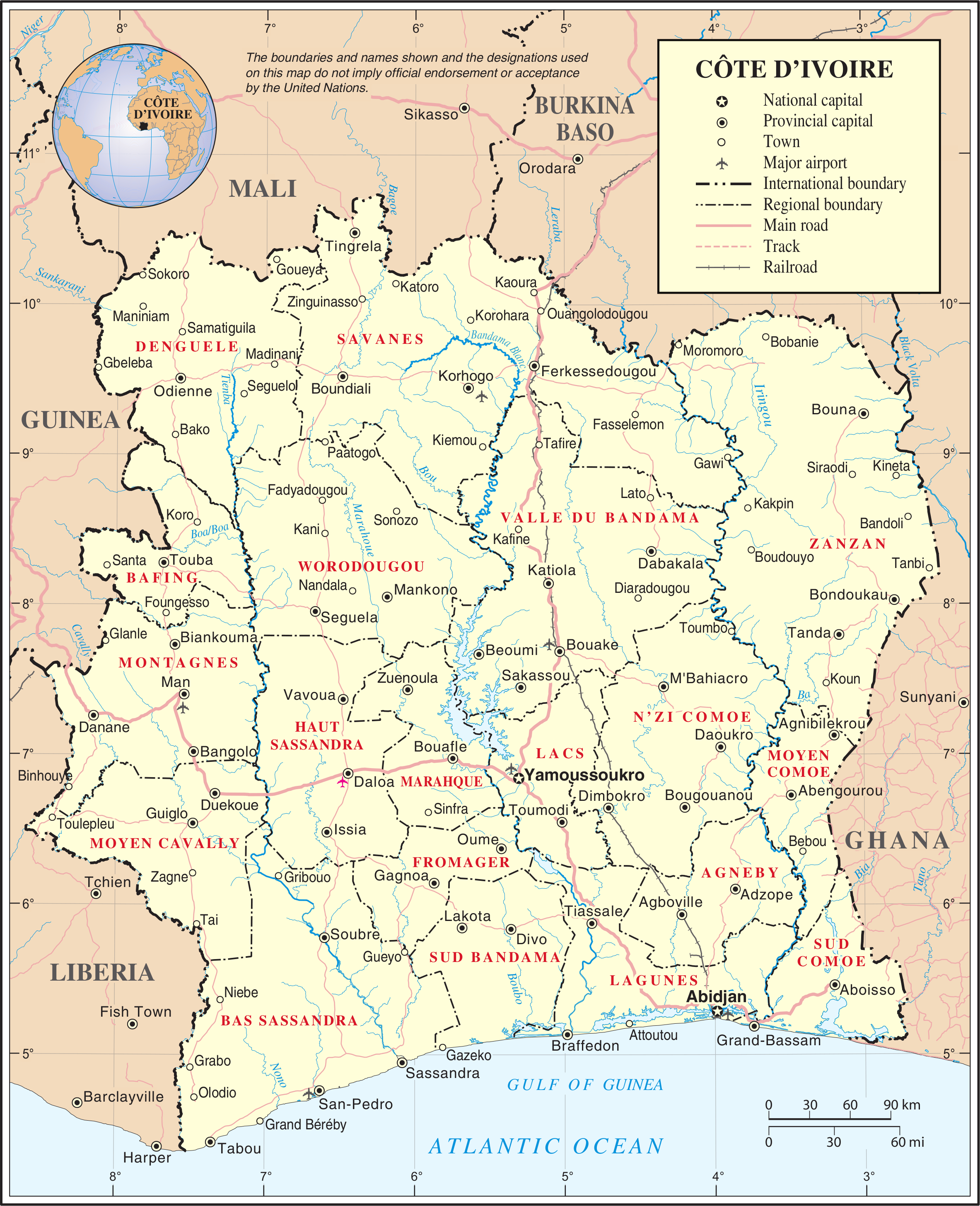
Map of Ivory Coast showing the main rivers and tributaries.

Four major river systems follow meandering courses from north to south, draining into the Gulf of Guinea. From west to east these are the Cavally, Sassandra, Bandama, and Comoé—all relatively untamed rivers navigable only short distances inland from the coast. In the north, many smaller tributaries change to dry streambeds between rains.

== Major rivers ==
The Cavally River has its headwaters in the Nimba Mountains in Guinea and forms the border between Ivory Coast and Liberia for over half its length. It crosses rolling land and rapids and is navigable for about fifty kilometers inland from its exit to the sea near Cape Palmas.

The Sassandra River Basin has its source in the high ground of the north, where the Tiemba River joins the Férédougouba River, which flows from the Guinea highlands. It is joined by the Bagbé, Bafing, Nzo, Lobo, and Davo rivers and winds through shifting sandbars to form a narrow estuary, which is navigable for about eighty kilometers inland from the port of Sassandra.

The Bandama River, often referred to as the Bandama Blanc, is the longest in the country, joining the Bandama Rouge (also known as the Marahoué), Solomougou, Kan, and Nzi rivers over its 800-kilometer course. This large river system drains most of central Ivory Coast before it flows into the Tagba Lagoon opposite Grand-Lahou. During rainy seasons, small craft navigate the Bandama for fifty or sixty kilometers inland.

Easternmost of the main rivers, the Comoé, formed by the Leraba and Gomonaba, has its sources in the Sikasso Plateau of Burkina Faso. It flows within a narrow 700-kilometer basin and receives the Kongo, and Iringou tributaries before winding among the coastal sandbars and emptying into the Ebrié Lagoon near Grand-Bassam. The Comoé is navigable for vessels of light draft for about fifty kilometers to Alépé.

Large dams were built in the 1960s and 1970s to control the flow of major rivers to the south. These projects created reservoirs, now referred to as lakes bearing the names of the dams- -Buyo on the Sassandra, Kossou and Taabo on the Bandama, and Ayamé on the small Bia River in the southeast corner of the country. Lake Kossou is the largest of these, occupying more than 1,600 square kilometers in the center of the country.

== By drainage basin ==
This list is arranged by drainage basin, with respective tributaries indented under each larger stream's name.

- Cestos River (Nuoun River)
- Cavalla River
- Nono River
- San-Pédro River
- Sassandra River
  - Davo River
  - Lobo River
  - Nzo River
  - Bafing River (Gouan River)
  - Boa River
  - Férédougouba River (Bagbé River)
  - Tienba River
- Boubo River
- Bandama River
  - Nzi River
  - Marahoué River (Bandama Rouge)
  - Kan River
  - Bou River
  - Solomougou River
- Ira River
- Agnéby River
- Komoé River
  - Ba River (Bayakokoré River)
  - Kongo River
  - Iringou River
  - Léraba River
- Bia River
- Tano River
- Black Volta
- Niger River (Mali)
  - Bani River (Mali)
    - Bagoé River
      - Kankélaba River (Mahandiani River)
    - Baoulé River
      - Dégou River
  - Sankarani River
