= Autonomous Port of Abidjan =

Commercial port at Treichville, Ivory Coast

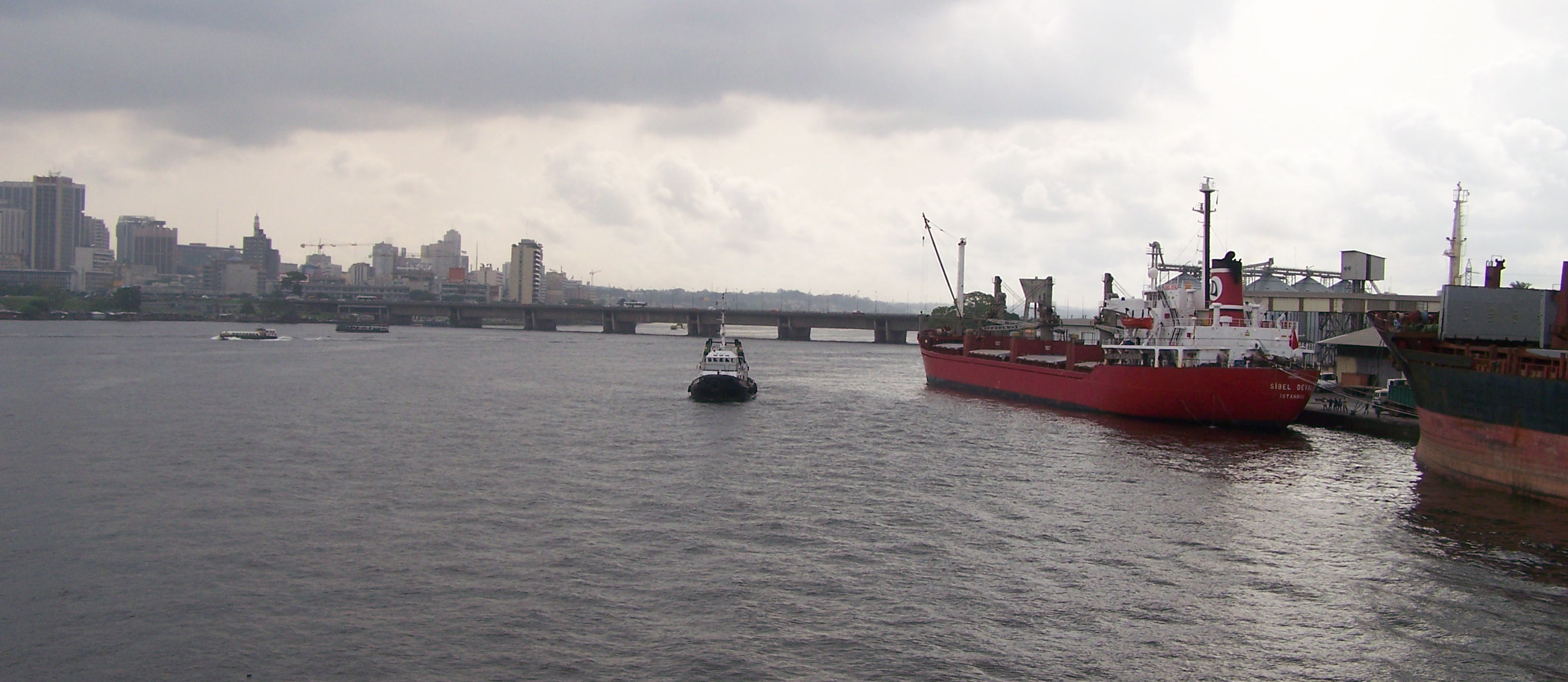
Autonomous Port of Abidjan

The Autonomous Port of Abidjan is a commercial port at Treichville, in southern Abidjan, Ivory Coast. It is a transshipment and intermodal facility and is managed as a public industrial and commercial establishment; the Director-General is Hien Sié.

The Port of Abidjan opened in 1951 after the development of the Vridi Canal, which enables deep-sea ships to use the port. It is the most important port in West Africa and the second most important in Africa after the Port of Durban. It is a major contributor to the economy of Ivory Coast, and the greater part of the external trade of landlocked countries such as Burkina Faso, Mali, Niger, Chad, and Guinea also passes through it.

The port conforms to the ISPS code. It offers a variety of related services, refining and industrial processing facilities. The leading companies operating at the port are SDV-SAGA (which employs over 4,000 people), SETV Terminal Operating Company Vridi, Sitarail and SIMAT.

== History ==
The coast of Ivory Coast had been an important site of commerce since the 15th century, with maritime traffic using the ocean lagoons as open roadsteads. During the French colonial period, wharves were constructed, the first two at Grand-Bassam in 1897 and 1923, a third at Port-Bouët in 1931, and a fourth at Sassandra in 1951.

Increasing traffic and the difficulty of handling large indivisible cargoes led to planning for the creation of a deep-water port. Beginning in 1892, Grand-Lahou, Grand-Bassam, Sassandra and Bingerville were all studied as possible locations. In 1898, a French mission including Charles François Maurice Houdaille, Captain Thomasset and Robert Wallace Crosson-Duplessis visited Ivory Coast to select the location for the port, which would also be the terminus of a projected railway (what became the Chemin de Fer Abidjan-Niger). Among the factors leading to their choice of Abidjan were the existence of an offshore canyon and the fact that Abidjan was on the shortest route between Bamako and the Atlantic.

To create the port, the Ébrié Lagoon was to be connected to the ocean by cutting through the barrier island at Port-Bouët. This was attempted in 1906–07, but shifting sand dunes and flooding repeatedly undid the work. After hydrological studies in the Netherlands, the problem was solved by the construction of the Vridi Canal; this was started in 1935, suspended during World War II, and completed in 1950. The canal is 2,700 metres (1.7 mi) long, 370 metres (1,210 ft) wide and 13.5 metres (44 ft) deep and enables deep-water vessels to use the port. Marshall Plan funds helped pay for the work. The Port of Abidjan was officially opened on 5 February 1951 by François Mitterrand, then Minister of Overseas France. The wharves at Port-Bouët and Grand-Bassam were subsequently closed.

Since 23 December 1992, the Autonomous Port of Abidjan has been legally constituted as a State Corporation (Société d'État).

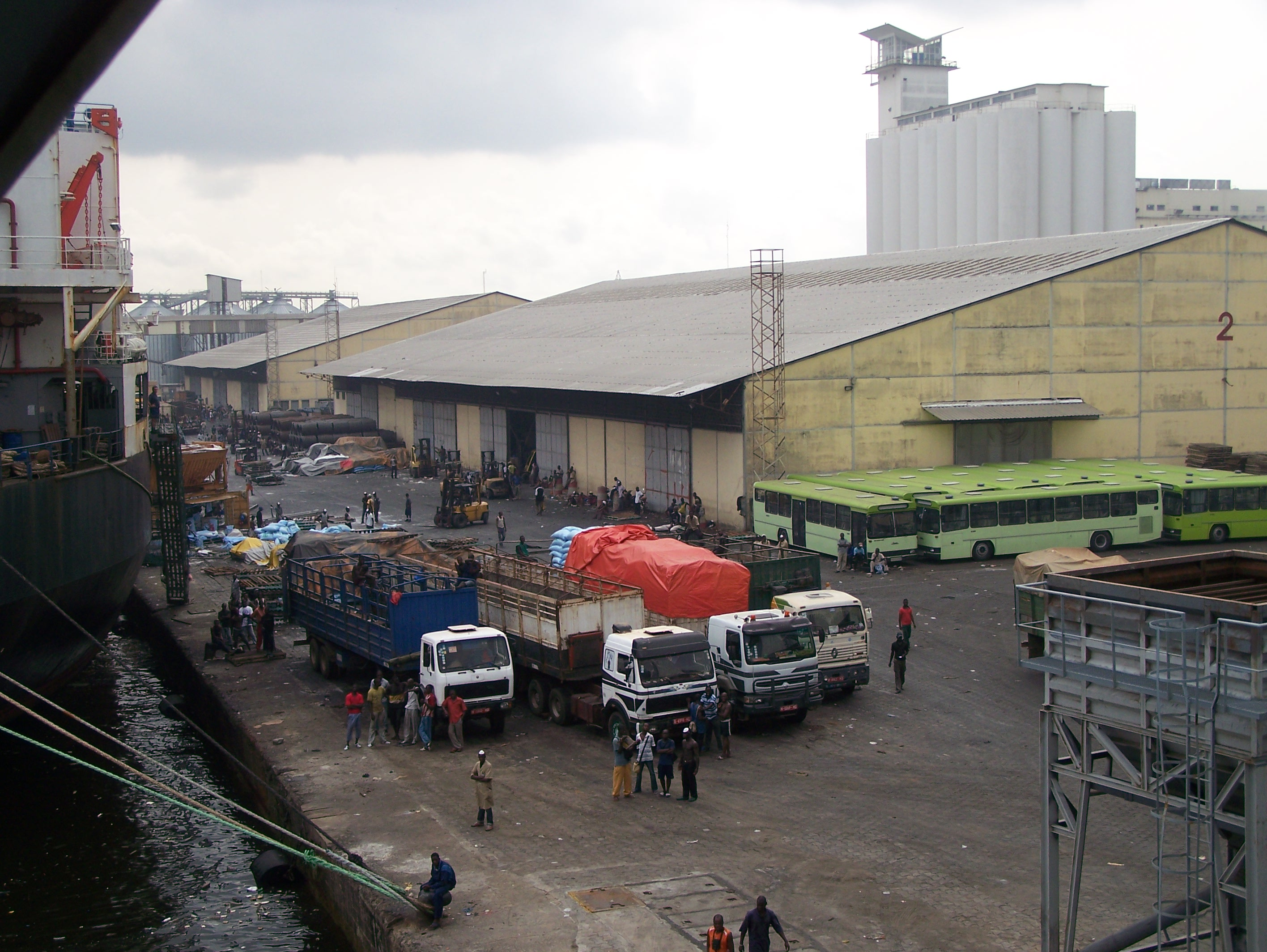
A wharf and warehouses at the Port of Abidjan

== Economic activity ==
The Port of Abidjan is the most important port in West Africa and the second most important in Africa after the Port of Durban. According to the Ivoirian Ministry of Economy and Finance, traffic through the port contributes to 90% of the customs revenues of Ivory Coast and 60% of the country's income. 70% of Ivoirian GDP passes through the port; 65% of industrial entities in the country use it, representing a workforce of 50,000 dependent on it. 70% of the external trade of landlocked countries of Africa such as Burkina Faso, Mali, Niger, Chad, and Guinea also passes through the port.

Traffic through the port reached 1,200,000 tons by 1962; in 2002 it was 16,309,596 tonnes; in 2013 it was 21.476 million tonnes, down from 21.713 million tonnes in 2012. In 2010 traffic was 22 million tonnes; to return to those levels, projects to enlarge the Vridi Canal, to deepen the port, and to add a second container terminal were undertaken in the 2010s. The port has also become a major industrial and manufacturing centre.

Abidjan is also an important fishing port, with an annual production of 400,000 tonnes.
