= Abidjan Lagoon Drainage Canal =

African waterbody

- Location: Abidjan, Côte d'Ivoire
- Type: Urban drainage and flood-management system
- Purpose: Stormwater drainage and flood mitigation
- Status: Operational
- Construction: 1975–1986
- Drainage basin: Ébrié Lagoon
- Major component: Cocody Flood Canal
- Related waterway: Vridi Canal

Abidjan Lagoon Drainage Canal is an urban drainage and flood-management network in Abidjan, Côte d'Ivoire, designed to channel stormwater and urban wastewater away from developed areas and into the Ébrié Lagoon. The network includes major drainage and waterway infrastructure such as the Cocody Flood Canal and Vridi Canal.

The system was formally developed between 1975 and 1986 following major flooding in Abidjan, including a catastrophic urban flood in 1969. It uses gravity-fed open canals and collector pipelines to manage stormwater and urban runoff.

The drainage network has subsequently experienced operational and environmental pressures associated with rapid urbanization, informal settlements, inadequate infrastructure expansion, solid-waste accumulation, and the discharge of untreated domestic and industrial wastewater.

Abidjan Lagoon Drainage Canal is also lagoon drainage network of Abidjan, Ivory Coast, it is an urban water management system designed to channel stormwater and wastewater into the Ébrié Lagoon. It serves as city's flood mitigation infrastructure and channels. It components include the Cocody Flood Canal, which manages runoff from central municipal districts, and the Vridi Canal, a maritime waterway that connects the Port of Abidjan directly to the Atlantic Ocean.

== Background ==
The urban geography of Abidjan is tied to the Ébrié Lagoon, a body of water covering 16% of the metropolitan area. Their occupation is fishing, Abidjan experienced an economic transformation through the completion of the Vridi Canal in 1950. It cuts through the coastal sandbar to connect the lagoon directly to the Atlantic Ocean, the canal established Abidjan as a deepwater maritime port and West African financial hub.

In 1969, there was a catastrophic urban flood, and between 1975 and 1986, the Ivorian government constructed a formal, separate sewerage and stormwater drainage network. The objective of this infrastructure was to use gravity-fed open canals and collector pipelines to discharge heavy equatorial stormwater and urban runoff away from residential sectors directly into the lagoon's major bays, such as the Cocody Flood Canal.

== Drainage Issue ==
The drainage network has faced operational strain. The growth of informal settlements, slow infrastructure expansion rates (under 3% annually since 1980), and solid waste accumulation have deteriorated the network's structural performance. The open flood channels conduits for untreated industrial and domestic wastewater. This structural evolution has transformed the drainage canals from simple flood mitigation tools into pathways for heavy metal sedimentation, fecal contamination, and localized eutrophication across the Ébrié Lagoon system.

== Flood risks ==
Abidjan metropolitan area are driven by a combination of intense equatorial precipitation, steep topographic variations, and structural limitations in the urban drainage network. Climate projection data indicates a steady increase in the intensity and frequency of extreme rainfall events across southern Côte d'Ivoire . This worsening climatic hazard directly impacts the municipality; out of the thirteen districts making up the autonomous district of Abidjan, eight are classified as being at high risk for catastrophic flooding.
