= Adessé =

- Village
- Location in Ivory Coast
- Coordinates: 5°10′N 4°42′W
- Country: Ivory Coast
- District: Lagunes
- Region: Grands-Ponts
- Department: Jacqueville
- Sub-prefecture: Jacqueville
- Time zone: UTC+0 (GMT)

Adessé is a coastal village in southern Ivory Coast. It is in the sub-prefecture of Jacqueville, Jacqueville Department, Grands-Ponts Region, Lagunes District.

Adessé was a commune until March 2012, when it became one of 1,126 communes nationwide that were abolished.
