= Tiagba =

- Village
- Location in Ivory Coast
- Coordinates: 5°15′N 4°43′W
- Country: Ivory Coast
- District: Lagunes
- Region: Grands-Ponts
- Department: Jacqueville
- Sub-prefecture: Jacqueville
- Time zone: UTC+0 (GMT)

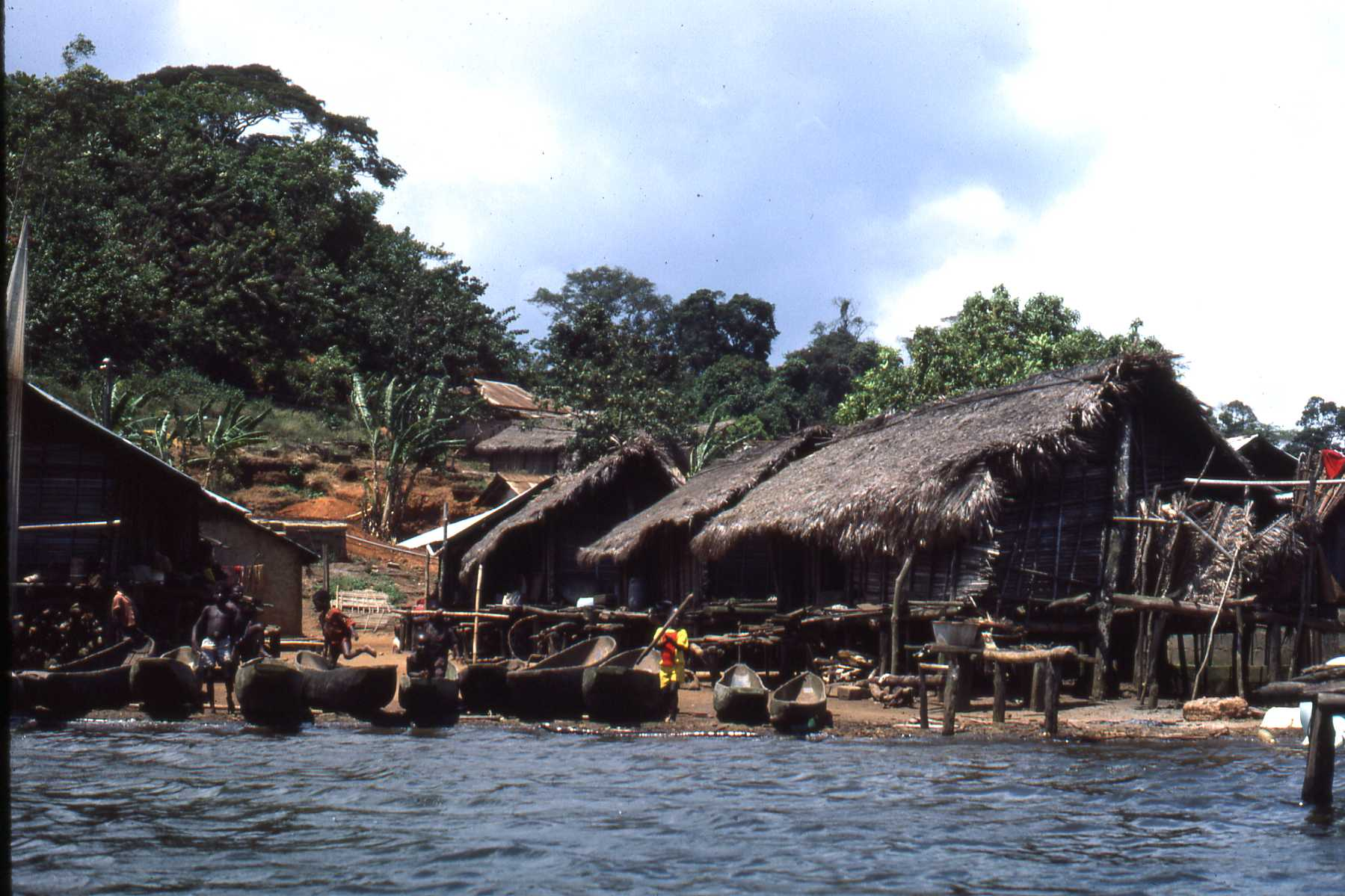
Tiagba with its traditional houses on stilts and dug-out canoes

Tiagba is a village in southern Ivory Coast, on the north shore of Ébrié Lagoon. It is in the sub-prefecture of Jacqueville, Jacqueville Department, Grands-Ponts Region, Lagunes District. The village is known for its traditional houses built on stilts.

Tiagba was a commune until March 2012, when it became one of 1,126 communes nationwide that were abolished.

== Tourism ==
Tiagba is popular with tourists. The village affords such activities as pirogue (canoe) rides and staying nights in the old houses that stand on the lakeside on stilts.
