= Cocody Flood Canal =

Flood-control canal in Cocody, Abidjan, Côte d'Ivoire

The Cocody Flood Canal (French: Canal de drainage de Cocody) is a stormwater drainage infrastructure located in the Cocody commune of Abidjan, Ivory Coast. It forms part of the city's broader flood management system designed to mitigate recurrent flooding in low-lying urban areas.

== Background ==
Cocody is one of the largest and most populous communes of Abidjan, situated on the northern side of the Ébrié Lagoon. The area experiences heavy seasonal rainfall, with annual precipitation exceeding 1,800 mm, making flood management a critical urban infrastructure concern.

Rapid urbanization and informal settlement expansion have placed significant pressure on the commune's drainage systems. Inadequate drainage capacity and poor waste management have been identified as contributing factors to persistent flooding problems.

== Infrastructure and function ==
The canal is designed to channel excess stormwater away from residential neighborhoods and major roadways, directing runoff toward the Ébrié Lagoon. It operates in conjunction with smaller collector drains and retention basins distributed throughout the commune.

The Cocody drainage network has undergone several rehabilitation projects funded by the Ivorian government and international development partners, including the World Bank, as part of the Abidjan Urban Resilience Project.

== Flooding issues ==
Despite the canal's presence, Cocody continues to experience flooding during intense rainfall events. Research and government reports cite several causes, including:

- Sedimentation and silt accumulation within the canal
- Blockage by solid waste and plastic debris
- Encroachment of informal structures on drainage easements
- Insufficient maintenance and cleaning schedules

In June 2018, severe flooding in Cocody caused multiple fatalities and significant property damage, prompting renewed government attention to drainage infrastructure investment.

== Recent developments ==
In 2020, the Ivorian government launched the Projet de Gestion Intégrée des Eaux Pluviales à Abidjan (Integrated Stormwater Management Project for Abidjan), which includes the rehabilitation and expansion of the Cocody drainage canal system. The project is supported by the Agence Française de Développement (AFD) and aims to reduce flood risk for over 500,000 residents.

== See also ==
- Geography of Ivory Coast
- Ébrié Lagoon
- Abidjan Lagoon Drainage Canal
