= List of shipwrecks in September 1878 =

The list of shipwrecks in September 1878 includes ships sunk, foundered, grounded, or otherwise lost during September 1878.

== 1 September ==
List of shipwrecks: 1 September 1878
Ship	State	Description
Garibaldi	United Kingdom	The dandy rigged smack was abandoned in the Dogger Bank. Her crew were rescued by the barque John Waterman (United Kingdom).
Fanny, and Glimpse	New Zealand	The 25-ton ketch Fanny parted her anchor chain in a fierce swell at Timaru. She fouled the lines of the ketch Glimpse (New Zealand), whose crew abandoned ship and took to Fanny. Fanny grounded near the harbour landing, allowing the combined crews to make it to shore, before drifting off and colliding with rocks. She became a total wreck. The sea lifted the Glimpse high and dry on a shingle bank. She was later able to be repaired and floated.
Flower of May	United Kingdom	The schooner ran aground in Liverpool Bay.
Lapwing	New Zealand	The 231-ton brigantine fell prey to a heavy swell at Timaru, parting her cables and running aground. All crew survived. She was able to be refloated several weeks later.
Mary and Ann	United Kingdom	The ship foundered in the North Sea with the loss of all hands, according to a message in a bottle that washed up at East Aberdour, Fife in October.
Mary Curran	United Kingdom	The ship was run into by the steamship Nora (United Kingdom) and sank in the Bristol Channel off Barry, Glamorgan. Mary Curran was on a voyage from New Ross, County Wexford to Newport, Monmouthshire.
Mary Louise	United States	The fishing schooner was run down and sunk 60 nautical miles (110 km) east of the Boston Lighthouse, Massachusetts. Her crew were rescued.
Melrose	New South Wales	The 287-ton barque parted her cables in a heavy swell at Timaru, New Zealand. She fouled the lines of the ketch Palmerston (New Zealand), and in doing so felled the ketch's foretopmast, which struck the ketch's master, killing him. The two remaining crew of the ketch abandoned ship and took to Melrose. Melrose ran aground on a rocky shore and broke up within minutes. One crewman drowned trying to get ashore. Palmerston, which had been at anchor, survived the swell.
Rachel Lotinga	United Kingdom	The brig ran aground off Hartlepool, County Durham. She was on a voyage from Söderhamn, Sweden to Whitby, Yorkshire. She was refloated with the assistance of two tugs and taken in to West Hartlepool in a leaky condition.
Sportsman	Norway	The ship was towed in to Hammerfest, Norway in a waterlogged condition. She was on a voyage from Arkhangelsk, Russia to Liverpool, Lancashire.

== 2 September ==
List of shipwrecks: 2 September 1878
Ship	State	Description
Gilbert Wheaton	United Kingdom	The schooner was driven ashore and wrecked at Addah, Ivory Coast.
Lizzie	United Kingdom	The schooner was driven ashore near Ballantrae, Ayrshire. She was on a voyage from Seville, Spain to Irvine, Ayrshire. She was refloated with the assistance of a tug and resumed her voyage.
Symbol	United Kingdom	The brig ran aground on the Cross Sand, in the North Sea off the coast of Norfolk. She was on a voyage from Newcastle upon Tyne, Northumberland to Rouen, Seine-Inférieure, France. She was refloated with assistance from the tug Meteor and assisted in to Lowestoft, Suffolk.
Teckalef	United States	The ship departed from New York for L'Orient, Morbihan. No further trace, reported missing.

== 3 September ==
List of shipwrecks: 3 September 1878
Ship	State	Description
Abercarne	United Kingdom	The barque was severely damaged by fire at Swansea, Glamorgan. Arson was suspected as the cause.
Agostino B.	Italy	The barque was wrecked at Fogo, Cape Verde. Her crew were rescued. She was on a voyage from Cádiz, Spain to Montevideo, Uruguay.
Divine Providence	France	The pilot boat collided with Wilburn (United Kingdom) and sank at Havre de Grâce, Seine-Inférieure. Her crew were rescued.
Princess Alice	United Kingdom	Part of Princess Alice beached after the collision The London Steamboat Company owned excursion paddle steamer was hit on the port side and cut in two by the collier Bywell Castle (United Kingdom) off the City of London gasworks, Beckton, in the Thames Estuary, sinking in 18 feet (5.5 m) of water. The wreck was raised on 7 September. An unknown number of passengers and crew were aboard, some estimate 600 to 1,000. Six to seven hundred were lost, including her captain. Survivors estimated between 69 and 150.
Texel	United Kingdom	The schooner was driven ashore near "Hufrudskar", Sweden. She was refloated and taken in to Stockholm, Sweden in a waterlogged condition.

== 4 September ==
List of shipwrecks: 4 September 1878
Ship	State	Description
Ann S. Cannon	United States	The schooner ran aground on a shoal off the coast of New Jersey in very rough seas and sank. Her crew of six was rescued by the United States Life Saving Service.
HMS Ariel	Royal Navy	The gunboat was driven ashore at Spittal Point, Northumberland.
Irishman	United Kingdom	The steamship ran aground at Honfleur, Manche, France. She was refloated and sailed for Burry Port, Glamorgan.
Oxel	United Kingdom	The ship ran aground on the Burbo Bank, in Liverpool Bay. She was refloated and beached.
Prince Leopold	United Kingdom	The steamship ran aground off the Cliff End Fort, Isle of Wight. She was on a voyage from The Needles, Isle of Wight to Southampton, Hampshire. She was refloated the next day and resumed her voyage.
Sully	France	The steamship ran aground at Port Eynon, Glamorgan, United Kingdom. She was refloated on 12 September and towed in to Swansea, Glamorgan.
Unnamed	Italy	The lighter sank at Naples.

== 6 September ==
List of shipwrecks: 6 September 1878
Ship	State	Description
Acklam	United Kingdom	The steamship collided with the steamship Emerald and sank in the North Sea 12 or 13 nautical miles (22 or 24 km) south of Flamborough Head, Yorkshire with the loss of two of her fifteen crew. Survivors were rescued by Emerald. Acklam was on a voyage from Trondheim, Norway to Lowestoft, Suffolk.
Beaumanoir	United Kingdom	The brig was wrecked on the Florida Reef. Her ten crew took to a raft; five survived to be rescued on 16 September by the barque Esteraa (Norway). Beaumanoir was on a voyage from Havana, Cuba to New York, United States.
Corsair	United Kingdom	The ship departed from the Brass River for Plymouth, Devon. No further trace, reported missing.
Democrat	United Kingdom	The steamship was driven ashore and wrecked on the Langness Peninsula, Isle of Man. She was on a voyage from Lisbon, Portugal to Glasgow, Renfrewshire.
Gelderland	Netherlands	The troopship was driven ashore at Cape Trafalgar, Spain. All on board survived. She was on a voyage from Amsterdam, North Holland to Batavia, Netherlands East Indies. She was refloated on 9 September and taken in to Cádiz for repairs.
Helios	Germany	The full-rigged ship was run down and sunk in the Atlantic Ocean by the steamship Utopia (United Kingdom). Her crew were rescued by Utopia. Helios was on a voyage from New York, United States to Rotterdam, South Holland, Netherlands.
Luxor	United Kingdom	The steamship ran aground and was severely damaged at Aberdeen. She was on a voyage from Almería, Spain to Aberdeen. She was refloated on 26 September.
Peter	Germany	The ship ran aground on the Longsand, in the North Sea off the coast of Essex, United Kingdom. She was on a voyage from Hörnefors, Sweden to Bristol, Gloucestershire, United Kingdom. She was refloated and taken in to Harwich, Essex in a leaky condition.

== 7 September ==
List of shipwrecks: 7 September 1878
Ship	State	Description
Alexander Nickels	United States	The brig was wrecked in a violent storm 1 1/2 nautical miles (2.8 km) south of New River, Florida. Five crewmen made it to shore, one died when the ship's boat capsized, and two died when they were washed overboard before she came ashore.
Amelia	United Kingdom	The Mersey Flat suffered an onboard explosion and sank at Liverpool, Lancashire.
Ariel	United Kingdom	The paddle steamer collided with a barge in the River Thames and was severely damaged.
Cupid	United Kingdom	The overloaded steamboat began to take in water through her portholes and was beached 1 nautical mile (1.9 km) from Blackwall, Middlesex. Her 600 passengers were taken off by Duke of Teck (United Kingdom). Cupid was on a voyage from Westminster, London to Woolwich, Kent.
Hoboken	United Kingdom	The paddle steamer collided with a barge in the River Thames and was severely damaged.
Tycoon	Canada	The brig was abandoned at sea. She was on a voyage from Port of Spain, Trinidad to Boston, Massachusetts, United States.
Victory	United Kingdom	The steamship ran ashore in Green Isle Bay, in Gare Loch. She was refloated.

== 8 September ==
List of shipwrecks: 8 September 1878
Ship	State	Description
HMS Bengal	Royal Navy	The troopship ran aground on the Ras Abdoorage while towing the transport Citadel (Flag unknown). HMS Bengal was on a voyage from Cyprus to Bombay, India. She was refloated the next day with assistance from HMS Iron Duke (Royal Navy) and taken in to Suez, Egypt, where she arrived on 10 September.
Plainmeller	United Kingdom	The steamship was driven ashore at Ras Ghareb, Egypt. She was on a voyage from Newport, Monmouthshire to Bombay. She was refloated.

== 9 September ==
List of shipwrecks: 9 September 1878
Ship	State	Description
Constance	United Kingdom	The steamship ran aground at the entrance to the Nieuwe Waterweg.
Lusa	United Kingdom	The ship was wrecked in the Piranji River. Her crew were rescued. She was on a voyage from London to Pernambuco, Empire of Brazil.
Mersey	United Kingdom	The schooner was wrecked on Roan Island, Caithness with the loss of five of her seven crew. She was on a voyage from Liverpool, Lancashire to Newcastle upon Tyne, Northumberland.
Pierremont	United Kingdom	The steamship ran aground east of Dunkirk, Nord, France. She was on a voyage from Baltimore, Maryland to Dunkirk. She was refloated.
Shamrock	United Kingdom	The schooner ran aground on the Long Rock, in the Belfast Lough. She was on a voyage from Ayr to Drogheda, County Louth. She was refloated.
Tern	United Kingdom	The steamship ran aground on the Maasdroge. She was on a voyage from Liverpool, Lancashire to Maassluis, South Holland, Netherlands. She was refloated with the assistance of two tugs.
Unnamed	France	The lighter was run into by the steamship Charles W. Anderson (United States) and sank at Dunkirk.

== 10 September ==
List of shipwrecks: 10 September 1878
Ship	State	Description
Agostino Guiseppe	Italy	The full-rigged ship was destroyed by fire off Tenedos, Ottoman Empire. She was on a voyage from Liverpool, Lancashire, United Kingdom to Constantinople, Ottoman Empire.
Archibald	United Kingdom	The ship was driven ashore at Rosehearty, Aberdeenshire.
Clarence	United Kingdom	The steamship struck a submerged object and sank at Fraserburgh, Aberdeenshire. She was refloated on 26 September and taken in to Peterhead, Aberdeenshire for drydocking. Subsequently taken in to Middlesbrough, Yorkshire for repairs.
Menai	United Kingdom	The schooner was driven ashore at Cairnbulg, Aberdeenshire. She was refloated.
Margaret	United Kingdom	The ship departed from Ayr for Waterford. No further trace, presumed foundered with the loss of all hands.

== 11 September ==
List of shipwrecks: 11 September 1878
Ship	State	Description
Aberfeldy	United Kingdom	The steamship ran aground at Schulau, Germany.
Copia	United Kingdom	The steamship departed from Barrow-in-Furness, Lancashire for Montreal, Quebec, Canada. No further trace, reported missing.
E. P. Dorr	United States	The schooner was wrecked in a gale 1 nautical mile (1.9 km) west of the Charlotte, New York Life Saving Station. All six crewmembers were rescued by the United States Life Saving Service.
Falcon	United Kingdom	The ship was damaged by fire at Thurso, Caithness.
Florence	United Kingdom	The schooner ran aground on the Heggan Skerry, off the coast of Caithness. She was on a voyage from Liverpool, Lancashire to Newcastle upon Tyne, Northumberland. She was refloated and taken in to Longhope, Orkney Islands in a waterlogged condition. She was further damaged in a gale on 13 September.
Helios	Germany	The barque was run down and sunk by the steamship Utopia (United Kingdom). Helios was on a voyage from New York, United States to Rotterdam, South Holland, Netherlands.
Ocean Belle	United Kingdom	The ship was driven ashore at "China Buckeer". She was on a voyage from Rangoon, Burma to Chittagong, India.
Onward	United Kingdom	The barque was abandoned at sea. Her crew were rescued by the barque Luchino (Italy). Onward was on a voyage from Barcelona, Spain to Miramichi, New Brunswick, Canada.
Pizzaro	Spanish Navy	The frigate, which had sprung a leak on 9 September, foundered in the Atlantic Ocean (35°30′N 57°54′W). Her 153 crew were rescued by the barque Carlo Frugoni (Italy). Pizzaro was on a voyage from St. George's, Bermuda to Faial Island, Azores.
Sèvre	France	The brig was wrecked in a gale at Cape Canaveral, Florida, United States. All ten crewmen made it to shore, one died when he tried to swim back out to the ship. She was on a voyage from Tampico, Mexico to Havre de Grâce, Seine-Inférieure.

== 12 September ==
List of shipwrecks: 12 September 1878
Ship	State	Description
Alexandra	United Kingdom	The fishing boat was driven ashore and severely damaged at Whitby, Yorkshire.
Ayacanora	United Kingdom	The vessel capsized and sank at West Cowes, Isle of Wight. All on board survived.
Bijou	United Kingdom	The yacht sank in the English Channel 4 nautical miles (7.4 km) off Dungeness, Kent during a squall. Two of the four people on board were rescued by the yacht Colon (United Kingdom). The others were reported missing. Bijou was on a voyage from Gravesend, Kent to Hastings, Sussex.
Charles Bath	United Kingdom	The pilot boat was run into by the schooner Clausina (United Kingdom) at Cardiff, Glamorgan and was severely damaged.
Corsica	Spain	The ship ran aground off the "Twin Island". She was on a voyage from Huanillos to Belfast, County Antrim, United Kingdom. She was refloated.
Eagle	United Kingdom	The fishing boat capsized in the North Sea 15 nautical miles (28 km) east of Berwick upon Tweed, Northumberland. Her crew were rescued by the schooner Senator (United Kingdom).
Empress	United Kingdom	The paddle tug was driven ashore and severely damaged at Whitby. She was refloated and taken in to Whitby.
Four Sisters	United Kingdom	The barque capsized off Sheerness, Kent. Her crew were rescued. She was on a voyage from London to Faversham, Kent.
Georgina Harley	United Kingdom	The ship was driven ashore at Whitby and drove against Star of Hope (United Kingdom. Her crew rescued.
Givern	United Kingdom	The fishing boat was driven ashore at Whitby. Her crew were rescued by rocket apparatus.
Good Design	United Kingdom	The fishing boat was driven ashore 1 nautical mile (1.9 km) north of Whitby. Her seven crew were rescued by the Coastguard using rocket apparatus.
Good Intent	United Kingdom	The fishing boat was driven ashore at Whitby. Her crew were rescued by rocket apparatus.
Gondola	United Kingdom	The yacht was lost in Icelandic waters. Her eight crew were rescued by the smack Telegraph (United Kingdom).
Jenny Lind	United Kingdom	The fishing boat was driven ashore and severely damaged at Whitby.
Lena	United Kingdom	The steamship ran aground in the River Thames. She was on a voyage from London to Saint Petersburg, Russia.
Lookout	United States	The full-rigged ship was wrecked near "Katsusnina". She was on a voyage from San Francisco, California to Port Townsend, Washington Territory.
Margaret	United Kingdom	The fishing boat was driven ashore and severely damaged at Whitby.
Maria Catharina	Germany	The schooner was driven ashore at Gravelines, Nord, France. She was consequently condemned.
Phantom	United Kingdom	The cutter capsized and sank in the River Yare at Cantley, Norfolk. All on board survived.
Punch	United Kingdom	The ship was driven ashore on Hogland, Russia. She was on a voyage from Blyth, Northumberland to Kronstadt, Russia. She was refloated and put in to Kotka, Grand Duchy of Finland.
Rambler	United Kingdom	The steamboat collided with the pier at Whitby.
Sephora	Germany	The steamship was driven ashore at Schulau. She was refloated and completed her voyage to Antwerp, Belgium.
Star of Hope	United Kingdom	The ship was driven ashore at Whitby. Her crew were rescued. She was then driven into by Georgina Harley (United Kingdom) and wrecked.
Welcome	United Kingdom	The fishing boat sank at Whitby. Her crew were rescued by the Whitby Lifeboat Robert Runswick ( Royal National Lifeboat Institution).
Yoxford	United Kingdom	The steamship foundered in a hurricane in the Atlantic Ocean 500 nautical miles (930 km) west of the Azores with the loss of one of her 25 crew. Survivors were rescued by the brigantine Wesley and Seymour Canada). Yoxford was on a voyage from New York, United States to Havre de Grâce, Seine-Inférieure.
Two unnamed vessels	United Kingdom	The lighters were driven ashore at Whitby. One was wrecked and the other was severely damaged.
Unnamed	United Kingdom	The Great Yarmouth-registered fishing boat was driven ashore and severely damaged at Whitby. Her crew were rescued.
Three unnamed vessels	United Kingdom	The fishing boats were driven ashore and wrecked at Staithes, Yorkshire. The crew of one of the boats were rescued by rocket apparatus.
Unnamed	United Kingdom	The Penzance-registered fishing boat was driven ashore at Whitby. Her crew were rescued.

== 13 September ==
List of shipwrecks: 13 September 1878
Ship	State	Description
Clothilde	United Kingdom	The brigantine struck a rock at "Bars" and was wrecked.
Corneille David	Belgium	The ship was driven ashore at Penco, Chile. She was on a voyage from Antwerp to Valparaíso, Chile.
Democrat	United Kingdom	The steamship ran aground in dense fog on the rocks of Langness Beg Isle of Man. She was on a voyage from Lisbon, Portugal to Glasgow, Renfrewshire. No lives lost. There was no trace of Democrat after she was washed away during a storm on 21 September.
Emilie	United Kingdom	The ship was driven ashore and wrecked at Helmsdale, Caithness. Her crew were rescued.
Johann Smidt	Netherlands	The ship ran aground on the Harsens Sandbank, off the coast of North Holland. She was on a voyage from Hanko, Grand Duchy of Finland to the Nieuwe Diep.
Sally	United Kingdom	The fishing sloop was driven ashore at Wells-next-the-Sea, Norfolk. Her crew were rescued by Eliza Adams (United Kingdom).
Southport	United Kingdom	The barque was driven ashore and wrecked on the coast of the Natal Colony.
Two Sisters	United Kingdom	The sloop was driven ashore and wrecked at Blakeney, Norfolk. Her crew survived. She was on a voyage from Grimsby, Lincolnshire to Lowestoft, Suffolk.
Unnamed	United Kingdom	The yacht sank at Garelochhead, Argyllshire.

== 14 September ==
List of shipwrecks: 14 September 1878
Ship	State	Description
Asia	United Kingdom	The paddle tug was run into by the steamship Countess of Aberdeen (United Kingdom) and sank in the River Tyne at South Shields, County Durham. Her crew survived. Subsequently refloated, repaired and returned to service.
Die Heimath	Germany	The barque struck a sunken rock off the Eilean Glas Lighthouse, Outer Hebrides and was holed. She was on a voyage from Riga, Russia to Liverpool, Lancashire, United Kingdom. She put in to Stornoway, Isle of Lewis, Outer Hebrides in a waterlogged condition.
D. R. Eaton	Canada	The ship departed from New York, United States for Antwerp, Belgium. No further trace, reported missing.
Ella B.	United Kingdom	The ship ran aground in the Crosby Channel. She was on a voyage from Charlottetown, Prince Edward Island, Canada to Liverpool, Lancashire. She was refloated.
Emma	Sweden	The schooner ran aground on the Osvald Shoal, in the Baltic Sea. She was on a voyage from Kalmar to an English port.
Fanny	United Kingdom	The ship departed from Fraserburgh, Aberdeenshire for Helsingør, Denmark. No further trace, presumed foundered with the loss of all hands.

== 15 September ==
List of shipwrecks: 15 September 1878
Ship	State	Description
Aelassie	United Kingdom	The yacht was driven ashore and severely damaged or wrecked at Millport, Cumbrae.
Ailsa	United Kingdom	The yacht was driven ashore and severely damaged or wrecked at Millport.
Ann	United Kingdom	The sloop was abandoned off Thurso, Caithness. Her crew were rescued bhy the Thurso Lifeboat. She was on a voyage from Loch Torridon to Castle Hill.
Boyne	United Kingdom	The schooner was driven ashore at Banff. She was refloated and taken in to Banff.
Cambria	United Kingdom	The schooner was driven ashore at Montrose, Forfarshire. She was on a voyage from Runcorn, Cheshire to St. Andrews, Fife. She was refloated.
Camel	United Kingdom	The ship was driven ashore at Cardurnock, Cumberland.
Chester	United Kingdom	The steam yacht was driven ashore and severely damaged or wrecked at Kilcreggan, Argyllshire.
Comus	United Kingdom	The Comus-class corvette was run into by the steamship City of Mecca (United Kingdom) in the Clyde and was damaged.
Einar	Norway	The schooner was driven ashore and wrecked at Stornoway, Isle of Lewis, United Kingdom. She was on a voyage from Brevig to Connah's Quay, Flintshire, United Kingdom. She was refloated on 24 September.
Ella Vale, and Minerva	United Kingdom	The ships collided off Milford Haven, Pembrokeshire and both sank. Ella Vale was on a voyage from Cardiff, Glamorgan to the Canary Islands. Her seven crew survived. Minerva was on a voyage from Cardiff to Youghal, County Cork. Her eighteen crew survived.
Empire of Peace	United Kingdom	The ship ran aground at Holyhead, Anglesey. She was on a voyage from Liverpool, Lancashire to the Delaware Breakwater, United States. She was refloated the next day. Subsequently towed back to Liverpool in a leaky condition.
Fairie	United Kingdom	The yacht was driven ashore and severely damaged or wrecked at Millport.
Gael	United Kingdom	The yacht sank at Millport, Cumbrae, Argyllshire.
Grace	United Kingdom	The yacht was driven ashore and severely damaged or wrecked at Millport. Her four crew were rescued.
Grace	United Kingdom	The cutter was driven ashore and wrecked at Glasgow, Renfrewshire.
Hannah	(United Kingdom of Great Britain and Ireland) Guernsey	The brigantine ran aground on the Shipwash Sand, in the North Sea off the coast of Suffolk. She was on a voyage from Guernsey to Middlesbrough, Yorkshire. She was refloated and resumed her voyage.
Indefatigable	United Kingdom	The brig was driven ashore at Moville, County Donegal. She was refloated on 2 October and towed in to Londonderry for repairs.
Jane and Ann	United Kingdom	The schooner was driven ashore at Lossiemouth, Moray. She was on a voyage from Lossiemouth to Sunderland, County Durham. She was refloated but subsequently sank. Her crew survived.
Kathinka	United Kingdom	The steam yacht was driven ashore at Fort William, Inverness-shire.
Laburnum	United Kingdom	The schooner was driven ashore and wrecked at Thurso with the loss of two of her seven crew. Survivors were rescued by rocket apparatus She was on a voyage from Dublin to Newcastle upon Tyne, Northumberland.
Lady Louisa	United Kingdom	The schooner was wrecked on Ragged Island, Isles of Scilly. She was on a voyage from Havre de Grâce, Seine-Inférieure, France to Plymouth, Devon
Lavinia	United States	The barque caught fire in The Downs. Her crew were rescued. She sank on 17 September. Her crew were subsequently arrested on suspicion of arson.
Lara	United Kingdom	The brigantine was driven ashore on Scalasdale Island, in the Sound of Mull, and sank. Her crew were rescued.
Leveret	United Kingdom	The yacht was wrecked in Wemyss Bay.
Liberator	United Kingdom	The ship was driven ashore at "Pullaheeny", County Mayo.
Lizzie	United Kingdom	The yacht sank at Largs, Ayrshire.
Louise Trapisnikoffs	Russia	The steamship was driven ashore in the Gulf of Ob. Her crew survived.
Luke Bruce	United Kingdom	The ship ran aground at Liverpool. She was on a voyage from Liverpool to Bonny, Africa. She was refloated and resumed her voyage.
Maggie	United Kingdom	The sloop was abandoned off Thurso. Her crew were rescued by the Thurso Lifeboat. She was on a voyage from Castle Hill to Buckie, Moray.
Maria S	Italy	The brig collided with the steamship Prince Soltykoff (United Kingdom) and sank off "Cape Angelo", Ottoman Empire.
Mary Jane	United Kingdom	The smack was wrecked near Bantry, County Cork. Her crew were rescued.
Mayflower	United Kingdom	The yacht foundered at Millport.
Merlin	United Kingdom	The yacht was driven ashore and severely damaged or wrecked at Millport.
Onward	New South Wales	The barque was wrecked on Huon Island, Tasmania. Her crew took to five boats. Those in four of the boats were reported missing.
Ripple	United Kingdom	The yacht was driven ashore and severely damaged or wrecked at Millport.
St. Helen	United Kingdom	The schooner was abandoned off Thurso. Her five crew were taken off by the Thurso Lifeboat.
Telegram	United Kingdom	The yacht was driven ashore and wrecked at Stornoway.
Telegraph	United Kingdom	The smack foundered off the coast of Iceland with the loss of all 22 people on board.
Teneriffe	United Kingdom	The ship was driven ashore at Silloth, Cumberland. She was on a voyage from Belfast, County Antrim to Maryport, Cumberland. She was refloated on 23 September and towed in to Silloth.
Unionist	United Kingdom	The schooner was abandoned off Thurso. Her crew were rescued by the Thurso Lifeboat. She was on a voyage from Wick, Caithness to Castle Hill.
Volante	United Kingdom	The yacht was driven ashore and severely damaged or wrecked at Millport.
Vulture	United Kingdom	The ship sank at Largs.
William and Mary	United Kingdom	The smack was abandoned off Thurso. Her crew were rescued by the Thurso Lifeboat. She was on a voyage from Montrose, Forfarshire to Londonderry.
Winifred	United Kingdom	The yacht was driven ashore and severely damaged or wrecked at Millport.
Two unnamed vessels	United Kingdom	The ships sank off "Kilcrogan", on the west coast of Scotland.

== 16 September ==
List of shipwrecks: 16 September 1878
Ship	State	Description
Angio	Canada	The brigantine was abandoned in the Atlantic Ocean. Her crew were rescued by Isaac (United States).
Ann	United Kingdom	The schooner was abandoned off Thurso, Caithness. Her crew were rescued by the Thurso Lifeboat.
Ann	United Kingdom	The smack was abandoned off Thurso. Her crew were rescued by the Thurso Lifeboat.
Caroline Martin	United Kingdom	The smack was abandoned off Thurso. Her crew were rescued by the Thurso Lifeboat.
Clementina	Italy	The barque was driven against the dock gates at Antwerp, Belgium and developed a severe leak.
D. L. Mackenzie	United Kingdom	The ship was driven ashore at Kronstadt, Russia. She was on a voyage from Stornoway, Isle of Lewis, Outer Hebrides to Saint Petersburg, Russia. She was refloated with assistance.
Ernest	United States	The schooner was driven ashore on the Isle of Cullen, County Mayo, United Kingdom.
Eva	United Kingdom	The schooner was abandoned off Thurso. Her crew were rescued by the Thurso Lifeboat.
Fannyfern	United Kingdom	The steamship was driven ashore and wrecked in Gare Loch.
Harriet Louise	United Kingdom	The smack was wrecked in Oepnefjord, Iceland. Her sixteen crew survived.
Jane Helen	United Kingdom	The brigantine was abandoned off Thurso. Her crew were rescued by the Thurso Lifeboat.
Jane Shearer	United Kingdom	The schooner was abandoned off Thurso. Her crew were rescued by the Thurso Lifeboat.
Laburnum	United Kingdom	The schooner was driven ashore and wrecked at Thurso with the loss of two of her five crew. Survivors were rescued by rocket apparatus.
Lark	United Kingdom	The schooner was abandoned off Thurso. Her crew were rescued by the Thurso Lifeboat.
Laurence Sanderson	United Kingdom	The smack was wrecked in Vepnessfjord, Iceland. Her crew survived.
Lizzie	United Kingdom	The yacht was driven ashore and wrecked at Dunoon, Argyllshire.
Maggie	United Kingdom	The smack was abandoned off Thurso. Her crew were rescued by the Thurso Lifeboat.
North Light	Denmark	The smack was wrecked in Vepnessfjord. Her crew were rescued.
Nuovo San Marco	Italy	The brig ran aground at Moville. She was refloated and towed in to Londonderry, United Kingdom.
Osman	United Kingdom	The steam yacht foundered at Kilcreggan, Argyllshire.
Phœnician	(United Kingdom of Great Britain and Ireland) Isle of Man	The scbooner was abandoned off Thurso. Her crew were rescued by the Thurso Lifeboat.
Rosemary	United Kingdom	The dandy was driven ashore and wrecked at Lowestoft, Suffolk. Her ten crew were rescued.
Sapphire	United Kingdom	The schooner was destroyed by fire at Kinsale, County Cork.
Unionist	United Kingdom	The schooner was abandoned off Thurso. Her crew were rescued by the Thurso Lifeboat.

== 17 September ==
List of shipwrecks: 17 September 1878
Ship	State	Description
Arnon	Brazil	The paddle steamer was destroyed by fire in the Purus River. All on board were rescued.
Byculla	United Kingdom	The ship was driven ashore at "Rasalkhan", Persia. She was on a voyage from Busreh, Persia to Bombay, India. She was refloated on 4 October.
Concezione Immacolata	Italy	The barque was severely damaged by fire at Naples. She was on a voyage from Swansea, Glamorgan, United Kingdom to Naples.
Esbjerg	Denmark	The steamship was driven ashore at Bandholm.
Kosmopoliet	Russia	The ship was driven ashore on Düne, Heligoland. Her crew were rescued.
Napoleon III	Norway	The barque was driven ashore at Hittarp, Sweden. She was on a voyage from Riga, Russia to Bordeaux, Gironde, France. She was refloated with the assistance of a tug.
Ovarense	(United Kingdom of Great Britain and Ireland) Sierra Leone	The brig ran around on the Ridge Sand. She was on a voyage from Sierra Leone to Hamburg, Germany. She was refloated and towed in to Ramsgate, Kent, United Kingdom by the tug Vulcan (United Kingdom).
Sophia	United Kingdom	The schooner was driven ashore near the Weser Lighthouse, Germany. She was on a voyage from Fraserburgh, Aberdeenshire to Bremen, Germany.
Star of the Sea	United Kingdom	The schooner was wrecked in Downing's Bay, County Down. Her crew were rescued.

== 18 September ==
List of shipwrecks: 18 September 1878
Ship	State	Description
Alert	United Kingdom	The brig put in to "Helsingør, Denmark in a sinking condition. She was on a voyage from South Shields, County Durham to Norrköping, Sweden.
Dolor	Norway	The ship was wrecked at "Bjerregaard", Denmark. Her crew were rescued. She was on a voyage from Portsmouth, Hampshire, United Kingdom to Drøbak.
Earl of Zetland	United Kingdom	The schooner was driven out to sea from Orkness, Shetland Islands and was abandoned by her crew.
Sarah Elizabeth	United Kingdom	The schooner ran aground in the Old Vlie. She was on a voyage from Runcorn, Cheshire to Harlingen, Friesland, Netherlands. She was later refloated and towed in to Harlingen.

== 19 September ==
List of shipwrecks: 19 September 1878
Ship	State	Description
Charles Chaloner	United Kingdom	The ship was driven ashore at Fleetwood, Lancashire. Her crew were rescued. She was on a voyage from Quebec City, Canada to Fleetwood.
Ino	New Zealand	The steamship was wrecked at Kakanui when she collided with a pier after her lines became fouled.
Mary E. Goodwin	United States	The ship foundered in the Atlantic Ocean (33°40′N 54°10′W). Three of her crew were reported missing. The rest were rescued by Margaret Falconer (United States). Mary E. Goodwin was on a voyage from Cartagena, Spain to Philadelphia, Pennsylvania.
Wasp	United Kingdom	The crew of the foundered Lowestoft fishing smack and her crew were picked up Mary Ann.

== 20 September ==
List of shipwrecks: 20 September 1878
Ship	State	Description
Alice Williams	United Kingdom	The schooner ran aground on the Kreothe Sands. She was on a voyage from Newport, Monmouthshire to Bremen, Germany. She was refloated with assistance.
Athlete	United Kingdom	The steamship ran aground in the River Usk. She was on a voyavge from Liverpool, Lancashire to Newport. She was refloated on 22 September.
Barbara Taylor	United Kingdom	The schooner was wrecked on Quelpart. Her crew were rescued. She was on a voyage from Shanghai, China to Nicholaieff, Russia.
Blue Wave	United Kingdom	The barque was driven ashore at Sea Palling, Norfolk. She was on a voyage from London to Blyth, Northumberland. She was refloated on 26 September and taken in to Great Yarmouth, Norfolk.
Maudley	United Kingdom	The steamship ran aground in the River Usk. She was on a voyage from Newport, Monmouthshire to Venice, Italy. She was refloated on 22 September and put back to Newport.
Prospect	United Kingdom	The schooner was abandoned in the North Sea. Her crew were rescued by Tania (Norway). Prospect was on a voyage from Hamburg, Germany to Leith, Lothian.

== 21 September ==
List of shipwrecks: 21 September 1878
Ship	State	Description
Cordelia	United Kingdom	The ship departed from South Shields, County Durham for Cartagena, Spain. No further trace.
Freja	Flag unknown	The ship departed from Shediac, Nova Scotia, Canada for Cardiff, Glamorgan, United Kingdom. No further trace, reported missing.
Jeremiah Timonson	United States	The schooner was destroyed by fire at Trieste. She was on a voyage from Philadelphia, Pennsylvania to Trieste.

== 22 September ==
List of shipwrecks: 22 September 1878
Ship	State	Description
Barbara Taylor	United Kingdom	The schooner was wrecked on the coast of Japan. Her crew survived, but were held prisoner by the local inhabitants.
Emerald Isle	United Kingdom	The ship ran aground on the Salthouse Bank, in the Irish Sea off the coast of Lancashire. She was on a voyage from Drogheda, County Louth to Preston, Lancashire. She was refloated with assistance from the Lytham Lifeboat.
New Prosperity	United Kingdom	The fishing boat collided with another fishing boat and sank off Whitby, Yorkshire. Her four crew were rescued by the other vessel.
Vixen	United Kingdom	The brig struck a sunken rock and sank off Guernsey, Channel Islands. Her crew were rescued.

== 23 September ==
List of shipwrecks: 23 September 1878
Ship	State	Description
Aspern	United Kingdom	The schooner was driven ashore and wrecked on the "Dueodde", in the Baltic Sea. She was on a voyagte from Memel to south Shields, County Durham.
Conciliator	United Kingdom	The barque was run down and sunk off Gibraltar by the steamship Richmond (United Kingdom). Her crew were rescued. Conciliator was on a voyage from the River Tyne to Savona, Italy.
Jeremiah Simonson	United States	The schooner was destroyed by fire at Trieste. Her crew were rescued.
Lady Bute	United Kingdom	The schooner struck the West Mouse. She put in to Cemaes, Anglesey in a sinking condition.
London	United Kingdom	The barque departed from Quebec City, Canada for a British port. No further trace, reported overdue.
Nestor	United Kingdom	The ship was driven ashore at Hela, Germany. She was on a voyage from Danzig, Germany to London. She was refloated with the assistance of a steamship on 11 October and towed in to Neufahrwassar, Germany.
Twee Gebroeders	Netherlands	The brig was driven ashore and wrecked on Sumbawa, Netherlands East Indies. Her crew were rescued. She was on a voyage from Europe to Makassar, Netherlands East Indies.
Vulcan	United Kingdom	The steamship was driven ashore at Zoutelande, Zeeland, Netherlands. She was on a voyage from Granton, Lothian to Antwerp, Belgium. She was refloated.
William Hastings	United Kingdom	The schooner ran aground on the Cross Sand, in the North Sea off the coast of Norfolk. She was on a voyage from Hartlepool, County Durham to Newhaven, Sussex. She was refloated and assisted in to Great Yarmouth, Norfolk.

== 24 September ==
List of shipwrecks: 24 September 1878
Ship	State	Description
Atlantic King	United Kingdom	The ship sprang a leak and put in to Trincomalee, Ceylon, where she sank. She was declared a total loss.
Edinburgh	United Kingdom	The steamship was driven ashore at "Free Island", Singapore, Straits Settlements. She was refloated on 25 September.
Johann	Sweden	The ship was driven ashore on Læsø, Denmark. She was on a voyage from Horsens, Denmark to Arendal, Norway. She was refloated and taken in to Fredrikshavn, Denmark in a leaky condition.
Martha Burnie	United Kingdom	The ship ran aground on the Droogden, in the Baltic Sea. She was refloated on 1 October and towed in to Kastrup, Denmark.
Mercur	Denmark	The brigantine ran aground off Scharhörn. She was on a voyyage from Hamburg, Germany to Saint Thomas, Virgin Islands. She was refloated.
Osbourne	United Kingdom	The steamship ran aground in the River Carron. She was then run into by the steamship Runswick (United Kingdom).
Parrott	United Kingdom	The Thames barge was run down and sunk at the Coalhouse Fort, Essex by the steamship Mourino.
Tern	United Kingdom	The steamship ran aground on the Hoorn. She was on a voyage from Liverpool, Lancashire to Maassluis, South Holland, Netherlands. She was refloated and resumed her voyage.

== 25 September ==
List of shipwrecks: 25 September 1878
Ship	State	Description
Amelia	United Kingdom	The tug ran aground and was wrecked at Shoreham-by-Sea, Sussex.
Ary Scheffer	Netherlands	The ship was driven ashore in the "Sepoedie Strait". She was on a voyage from the Netherlands to Java, Netherlands East Indies. She subsequently sank. Her crew survived.
Commerce	Canada	The full-rigged ship collided with the steamship Empire (United Kingdom) and sank in the English Channel off Hastings, Sussex, United Kingdom with the loss of two of her eighteen crew. Commerce was on a voyage from Philadelphia, Pennsylvania, United States to Antwerp, Belgium.
Gertrude	United Kingdom	The ship departed from the Coosa River, Alabama, United States for Drogheda, County Louth. No further trace, reported overdue.
Kingtown	United Kingdom	The ship departed from Saint Vincent for London. No further trace, reported missing.
Maid of the Mist	United States	Maid of the Mist During a gale, the wooden schooner grounded, broke in half, and sank in 7 feet (2.1 m) of water in Lake Huron off the coast of Michigan at 45.116183°N 83.3174°W.
Marianne Briggs	United Kingdom	The steamship ran aground on the Whitton Ness, in the North Sea off the coast of Lincolnshire. She was on a voyage from Grimsby, Lincolnshire to Hamburg, Germany. She was refloated and towed back to Grimsby.
St. Anne	United Kingdom	The ship ran aground in the Hooghly River. She was refloated and resumed her voyage.
St. Clair	United Kingdom	The steamship capsized at Tobermory, Isle of Mull with the loss of two lives. She was subsequently righted and taken in to Greenock, Renfrewshire, where she arrived on 3 October.
St. Hermeland	Sweden	The ship was driven ashote at Kappelshamn, Gotland. She was refloated and taken in to Visby.
Sylph	(United Kingdom of Great Britain and Ireland) Isle of Man	The fishing boat struck a rock and sank off Gansey. Her crew survived.
Victoria	United Kingdom	The steamship ran aground in the River Thames downstream of Gravesend, Kent. She was on a voyage from London to New York, United States. She was refloated and resumed her voyage.

== 26 September ==
List of shipwrecks: 26 September 1878
Ship	State	Description
Ary Scheffer	Netherlands	The ship was driven ashore in the Leopedie Straits. She was on a voyage from a Dutch port to Batavia, Netherlands East Indies. She subsequently sank. Her crew survived.
General Sedgwick	United States	The schooner was wrecked at "Adjudah", Africa.
Guiseppina Corcurullo	Italy	The barque departed from New York, United States for Marseille, Bouches-du-Rhône, France. No further trace, presumed foundered with the loss of all hands.
Kenna	Germany	The schooner collided with the steamship Monica (United Kingdom) and ran aground in the Elbe at Teufelsbrück. She was on a voyage from Hamburg to a Norwegian port.
Malaga	United Kingdom	The steamship ran aground and capsized in the Elbe downstream of the Kugelbake. Her crew were rescued. She was on a voyage from Hamburg, Germany to Grimsby, Lincolnshire.
Peri	United Kingdom	The steamship was driven ashore at Seascale, Cumberland. She was on a voyage from Dublin to Maryport , Cumberland. She was refloated on 1 October and towed in to Whitehaven, Cumberland.
Queen Anne	United Kingdom	The steamship was wrecked at Fulta, India. All on board were rescued.
Stentor	United Kingdom	The steamship collided with the steamship Bergannd (Sweden) in the Scheldt and was beached at Antwerp, Belgium.
St. James	United Kingdom	The steamship ran aground at Leith, Lothian. She was on a voyage from Huanillos, Cuba to Leith. She was refloated.
William	United Kingdom	The smack was driven ashore and wrecked at "Innomore", 5 nautical miles (9.3 km) north of the Mull of Kintyre, Argyllshire. Her crew were rescued.
Woya	Sweden	The ship ran aground on the Oesby Reef, off Öland. She was refloated and towed in to Oskarshamn.

== 27 September ==
List of shipwrecks: 27 September 1878
Ship	State	Description
Emma	Denmark	The schooner foundered in the Dogger Bank. Her crew were rescued by the smack Estelle (United Kingdom). Emma was on a voyage from Norrtälje, Sweden to Hull, Yorkshire, United Kingdom.
Jylland	Denmark	The steamship ran aground at the entrance to the Nieuwe Waterweg. She was on a voyage from Kronstadt, Russia to Rotterdam, South Holland, Netherlands. She was refloated.
Lizzie Titus	United States	The schooner was wrecked in a hurricane at Jacmel, Haiti.
Maria	United Kingdom	The steamship ran aground on the Pluckington Bank, in Liverpool Bay. She was on a voyage from Santander, Spain to Liverpool, Lancashire. She was refloated and taken in to Liverpool.
Martha Margherita Burzone	Italy	The ship ran aground on the Spike Bank, off the coast of County Cork, United Kingdom. She was refloated with the assistance of a tug.
Nellie Jones	Canada	The ship departed from Saint John, New Brunswick for Waterford, United Kingdom. No further trace.
Ocean Belle	United Kingdom	The ship was driven ashore at Chittagong, India.
Princess Alexandra	Denmark	The barque was wrecked in a hurricane at Jacmel.
Rainbow	United Kingdom	The steamship ran aground in the Elbe downstream of Brunshausen, Germany. She was on a voyage from London to Hamburg, Germany. She was refloated on 12 October with the assistance of two tugs and was taken in to Hamburg.
Sarah	United Kingdom	The fishing smack foundered in the English Channel off Bognor, Sussex. Her crew survived.
Sarah Fox	United Kingdom	The schooner was wrecked at the mouth of the River Mersey. Her crew were rescued by a tug. She was on a voyage from Teignmouth, Devon to Ellesmere, Cheshire.
Water Lily	United States	The schooner ran aground near Life Saving Station No. 6 on the Massachusetts coast and broke up. She was high enough on the beach her crew of two were able to jump onto the beach.
William	United Kingdom	The brig ran aground and was wrecked at Maryport, Cumberland. She was on a voyage from Maryport to Dublin. She was refloated on 10 October.
Unnamed	Flag unknown	The schooner ran aground on the Maplin Sand, in the North Sea off the coast of Essex, United Kingdom.

== 28 September ==
List of shipwrecks: 28 September 1878
Ship	State	Description
Arcturus	Denmark	The brigantine was driven ashore at Tornby. Her crew were rescued. She was on a voyage from Rotterdam, South Holland, Netherlands to Fredrikstad.
Elisabeth	Russia	The schooner was driven ashore at Össby, Öland, Sweden. She was on a voyage from Riga to Lübeck, Germany. She was refloated with assistance.
Hermann Ludwig	Belgium	The ocean liner departed from New York, United States for Antwerp. No further trace, presumed foundered in the Atlantic Ocean with the loss of all 50 passengers and crew.
Orontes	United Kingdom	The steamship foundered in the North Sea. Her crew were rescued by the steamship Esbern Snare (Denmark). Orontes was on a voyage from Liverpool, Lancashire to Copenhagen, Denmark.
Owner's Pride	United Kingdom	The smack foundered off the mouth of the Humber. Her five crew were rescued.
Royal Saxon	United Kingdom	The tug collided with the ferry Claughton (United Kingdom) in the River Mersey and was beached.
Uller	Norway	The ship was driven ashore and wrecked near 's-Gravesande, South Holland, Netherlands. Her crew were rescued. She was on a voyage from Stavanger to Antwerp, Belgium.

== 29 September ==
List of shipwrecks: 29 September 1878
Ship	State	Description
Castor	Germany	The steamship collided with another steamship. She was run onto the Nore and sank. All on board were rescued by the tug Rainbow (United Kingdom). Castor was on a voyage from Hamburg to London, United Kingdom.
Earl of Carrick	United Kingdom	The steamship was wrecked at Connel, Argyllshire. She was on a voyage from Workington, Cumberland to Bonar Bridge, Ross-shire.
Magi Crescent	United Kingdom	The ship struck the Longships, Cornwall and foundered with the loss of all 30 crew, according to a message in a bottle that washed up at Tenby, Pembrokeshire.
Orontes	United Kingdom	The steamship foundered in the North Sea.
Johanna	Denmark	The brig was abandoned at sea. Her crew were rescued by the barque Forest (Dominion of Newfoundland) Newfoundland Colony), which put some of her crew aboard. They took Johanna in to Falmouth, Cornwall, United Kingdom.

== 30 September ==
List of shipwrecks: 30 September 1878
Ship	State	Description
Anna	United Kingdom	The ship was driven ashore at Ballyshannon, County Donegal. She was on a voyage from Miramichi, New Brunswick, Canada to Ballyshannon. She was refloated oh 7 October and towed in to Ballyshannon.
Charles Green	United Kingdom	The schooner was driven ashore and wrecked at Aberdeen. Her crew were rescued. She was on a voyage from Antwerp, Belgium to Fraserburgh, Aberdeenshire
Dronning Louise	Norway	The barque ran aground and was wrecked on the Hinderbank, off Goeree-Overflakkee, Zeeland, Netherlands. Her crew were rescued. She was on a voyage from Drammen to Antwerp, Belgium.
Eagle	United Kingdom	The fishing smack sprang a leak and foundered in the North Sea 50 nautical miles (93 km) east of Spurn Point, Yorkshire. Her crew were rescued.
Edith Mary	United Kingdom	The ship sank off Thornham, Norfolk. Her crew survived.
Elise	Germany	The ship was sighted in the Øresund whilst on a voyage from Memel to London, United Kingdom. No further trace, reported missing.
Emma	Norway	The barque was wrecked on Cape Sable Island, Nova Scotia, Canada. Her crew were rescued.
Florist	United Kingdom	The brig was driven ashore and wrecked at Svaneke, Denmark. She was on a voyage from Söderhamn, Sweden to Hartlepool, County Durham.
Georgia	United Kingdom	The steamship was driven ashore and wrecked 18 nautical miles (33 km) south of Punta Arenas, Chile. All on board were rescued.
Goldhunter	United Kingdom	The ship ran aground at Shanghai, China. She was refloated.
Olive Branch	United Kingdom	The barque sank at Langstone, Hampshire. She was refloated on 11 November and taken in to Portsmouth, Hampshire, where she was beached.
Prima	Germany	The steamship ran aground at the mouth of the River Carron. She was on a voyage from Alloa, Clackmannanshire, United Kingdom to Wismar. She was refloated and resumed her voyage.
Tepania	United Kingdom	The ship ran aground in the Yangtze. She was on a voyage from Shanghai to London. She was refloated and resumed her voyage.
Tokio Maru	Japan	The ship was severely damaged in a typhoon at Shanghai.

== Unknown date ==
List of shipwrecks: Unknown date in September 1878
Ship	State	Description
Adria	United Kingdom	The ship was wrecked on the Gannet Rocks, Nova Scotia, Canada. She was on a voyage from Saint John, New Brunswick, Canada to Queenstown, County Cork.
Annie Braginton	United Kingdom	The ship ran aground at Mahanoro, Merina Kingdom before 7 August. She was on a voyage from Mahanoro to Mauritius. She was refloated and resumed her voyage.
Anthracite	United Kingdom	The ship was driven onto the Trefusis Rock, Cornwall and sank.
Argyra	United Kingdom	The brig was wrecked on the Dutch coast with the loss of the captain's wife and his two sons and a daughter. The rest of the crew were saved.
Ben Voirlich	Flag unknown	The steamship ran aground in the Florida Keys. She was on a voyage from New Orleans, Louisiana, United States to Rotterdam, South Holland, Netherlands. She was refloated and taken in to Norfolk, Virginia, United States in a severely leaky condition.
Brita	France	The ship was run down and sunk on the Grand Banks of Newfoundland by George Bell ( Canada) with the loss of two of her crew.
Caroline	Germany	The schooner foundered in the North Sea on or before 4 September. Her crew were rescued by the brig Fanchon (Germany). Caroline was on a voyage from Newcastle upon Tyne, Northumberland, United Kingdom to Stettin.
Charlie H Down	United States	The barque was one of five ships reported to be wrecked in the Tonalá River.
Clifton	United Kingdom	The ship ran aground at Invercargill, New Zealand before 19 September. She was refloated.
Crimea	United Kingdom	The barque was one of five ships reported to be wrecked in the Tonalá River.
Delhi	United Kingdom	The brigantine was abandoned in the Irish Sea 7 nautical miles (13 km) south west of Douglas Head, Isle of Man. Her six crew were rescued by the Douglas Lifeboat John Turner ( Royal National Lifeboat Institution). Delhi was on a voyage from Poole, Dorset to Runcorn, Cheshire.
Derwentwater	United Kingdom	The ship was beached at Mobile, Alabama, United States in a sinking condition. She was on a voyage from Rio de Janeiro, Brazil to Mobile.
Emma J. Shanks	Canada	The schooner was driven ashore at Inigonish, Nova Scotia. She was on a voyage from Cape Breton Island to Halifax, Nova Scotia.
Emilia Hain	Canada	The ship was destroyed by fire in the Atlantic Ocean before 9 September.
Esperance	France	The ship foundered in the Grand Banks of Newfoundland. Her crew were rescued.
Free Trade	United Kingdom	The schooner was wrecked. She was on a voyage from Saint John, New Brunswick to Dungarvan, County Waterford.
Glamorganshire	United Kingdom	The barque ran aground in the Inland Sea of Japan. She was on a voyage from Hong Kong to Nagasaki, Japan. She was refloated eight days later with the assistance of the local inhabitants.
Indus	France	The steamship was driven ashore east of Cape St. Vincent, Portugal. Her crew were rescued. She was on a voyage from Marseille, Bouches-du-Rhône to London, United Kingdom. She was refloated and towed in to Cádiz, Spain in a leaky condition by a French steamship.
Jenny Lind	United Kingdom	The ship was driven ashore near the west pier at Whitby. She was refloated by a steam tug.
Jessie Osbourne	United Kingdom	The full-rigged ship was driven ashore and wrecked in Tennessee Cove, California, United States. She was on a voyage from Port Augusta, South Australia to San Francisco, California. Although condemned and sold, she was refloated and towed in to San Francisco.
Johann Friedrich	Germany	The ship was driven ashore at "Simonoscki". She was on a voyage from Hiogo, Japan to Tianjin, China. She was refloated and put in to Nagasaki, where she arrived on 8 September in a leaky condition.
Kere	Flag unknown	The brigantine was damaged in a hurricane at St. Jago de Cuba, Cuba.
Lady Ellen	United Kingdom	The ship was abandoned in the Indian Ocean before 14 September.
Levant	United Kingdom	The steamship ran aground at Brăila, United Principalities. She was on a voyage from Brăila to Malta. She was refloated, and subsequently resumed her voyage on 5 September.
Lightcliffe	Nicaragua	The barque was one of five ships reported to be wrecked in the Tonalá River.
Maria Becker	Germany	The barque was one of five ships reported to be wrecked in the Tonalá River.
M. H. Morris	Canada	The ship brigantine was damaged in a hurricane at St. Jago de Cuba.
Minerva	Flag unknown	The ship was towed in to Fernandina, Florida, United States in a derelict condition before 16 September. She was on a voyage from Mexico to a European port.
Moi Na	France	The ship was wrecked on the coast of the Newfoundland Colony.
Ocean Lily	Canada	The schooner was wrecked in a hurricane at St. Jago de Cuba before 14 September.
Ohio	United Kingdom	The brig foundered in the North Sea. Her seven crew were rescued by the barque Elise (Germany). Wreckage from the ship came ashore on the Råberg Mile, Denmark in October.
Padang Packet	Germany	The ship was wrecked near Yucatan, Mexico before 10 September. Her crew were rescued. She was on a voyage from Pernambuco to a port in the Gulf of Mexico.
Pouvert	Flag unknown	The brigantine was wrecked in a hurricane at St. Jago de Cuba before 17 September.
Prosperité	Canada	The ship was driven ashore at Yarmouth, Nova Scotia. She was on a voyage from Saint John, New Brunswick to Valencia, Spain. She was refloated and taken in to Yarmouth in a leaky condition.
Reliance	United States	The steamboat was destroyed by a boiler explosion at St. Mary's, Georgia with the loss of several lives. She was on a voyage from Savannah, Georgia to Jacksonville, Florida.
Rival	United States	The schooner was lost in the Magdalen Islands, Nova Scotia. Her crew were rescued.
Santa Roas	United States	The barque was one of five ships reported to be wrecked in the Tonalá River.
St. Joseph	France	The ship foundered in the Bay of Newfoundland.
Success	France	The ship struck a reef off Russell Island, Queensland and sank with the loss of three of her crew. She was on a voyage from Yokohama, Japan to Australia.
Svea	Flag unknown	The ship ran aground at Westport, County Mayo. She was on a voyage from Baltimore, Maryland, United States to Westport. She was refloated with assistance.
Thomas	United Kingdom	The brig was destroyed by fire at sea. Her crew were rescued. She was on a voyage from Charleston, South Carolina, United States to Liverpool.
Vindolana	United Kingdom	The steamship ran aground on the Traverse, in the Saint Lawrence River. She was on a voyage from Montreal, Quebec, Canada to Havre de Grâce, Seine-Inférieure, France. She had been refloated by 10 October and taken in to New York, United States or Quebec City for repairs.
Wasp	United Kingdom	The fishing smack foundered in the North Sea before 19 September. Her crew were rescued by the fishing smack Mary Ann (United Kingdom).
Wilton	United Kingdom	The barque was wrecked on the Murr Ledges. Her crew survived. She was on a voyage from Caernarfon to Saint John, New Brunswick.
Zephyr	United Kingdom	The yacht ran aground and was severely damaged at Clacton-on-Sea, Essex after 21 September. She was refloated and beached.
