= Kankélaba River =

River in Africa

The Kankélaba River is a tributary of the Bagoé River in western Africa. It flows through north-western Ivory Coast and southern Mali and forms part of the international boundary between the two states. In southern Mali it flows into the Bagoé River.
