= Agnéby River =

River in West Africa

Coordinates: 5°18′03″N 4°20′06″W

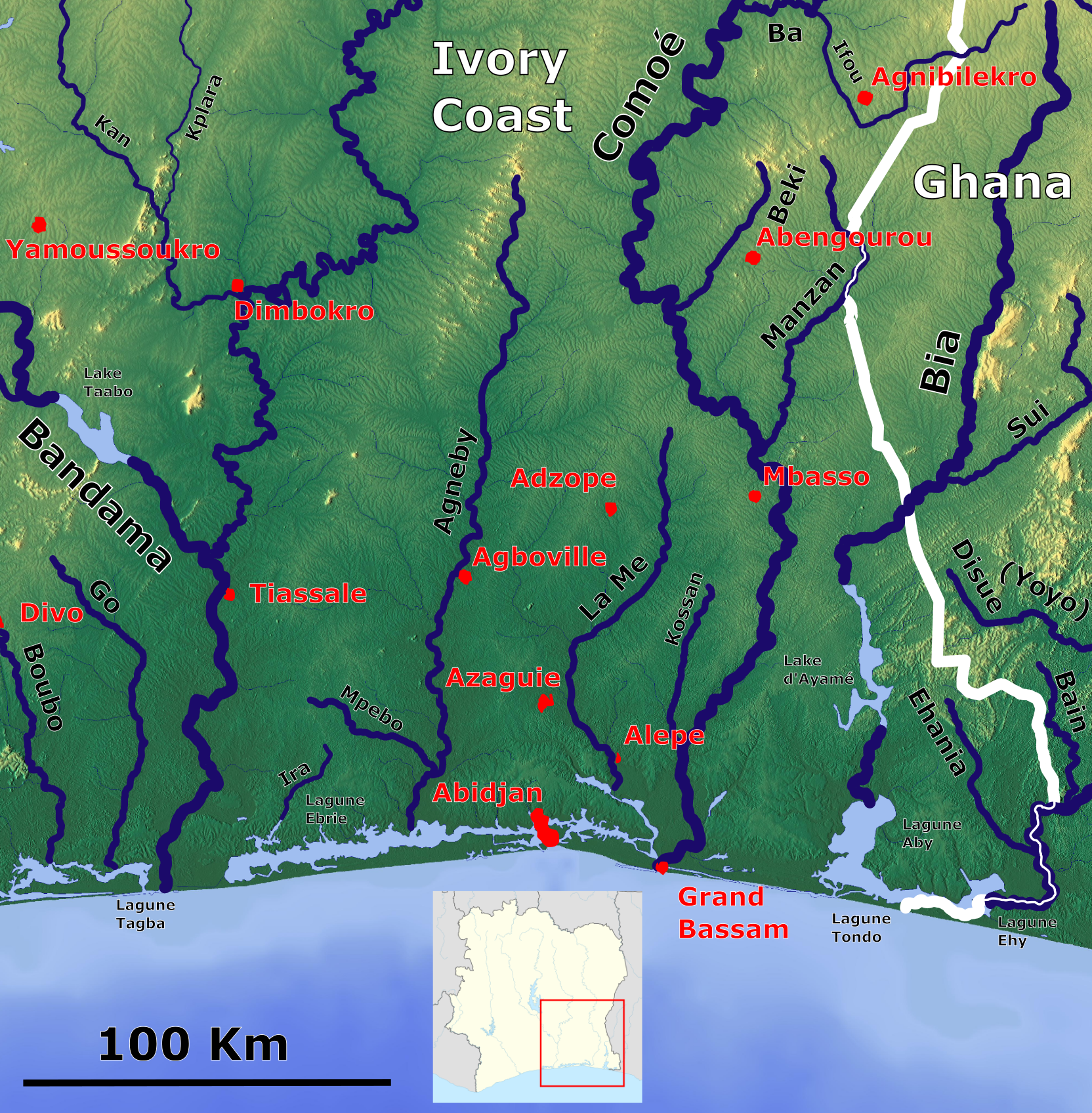
Rivers of Ivory Coast East coast (Agneby in Centre)

The Agneby River, also known as the Agbo River, is a river in Ivory Coast in West Africa. The river originates from springs near Agoua in the region of Bongouanou, flows southwards and empties into the Ébrié Lagoon in the south of the country. The climate in this region alternates between moisture bearing winds from the Atlantic Ocean forming the West African monsoon and dry harmattan winds from the Sahara. These alternating wet and dry seasons causes great variations in the volume of water in the river.
