= Bagoé River =

River in Africa

Coordinates: 9.567778°N 6.980833°W

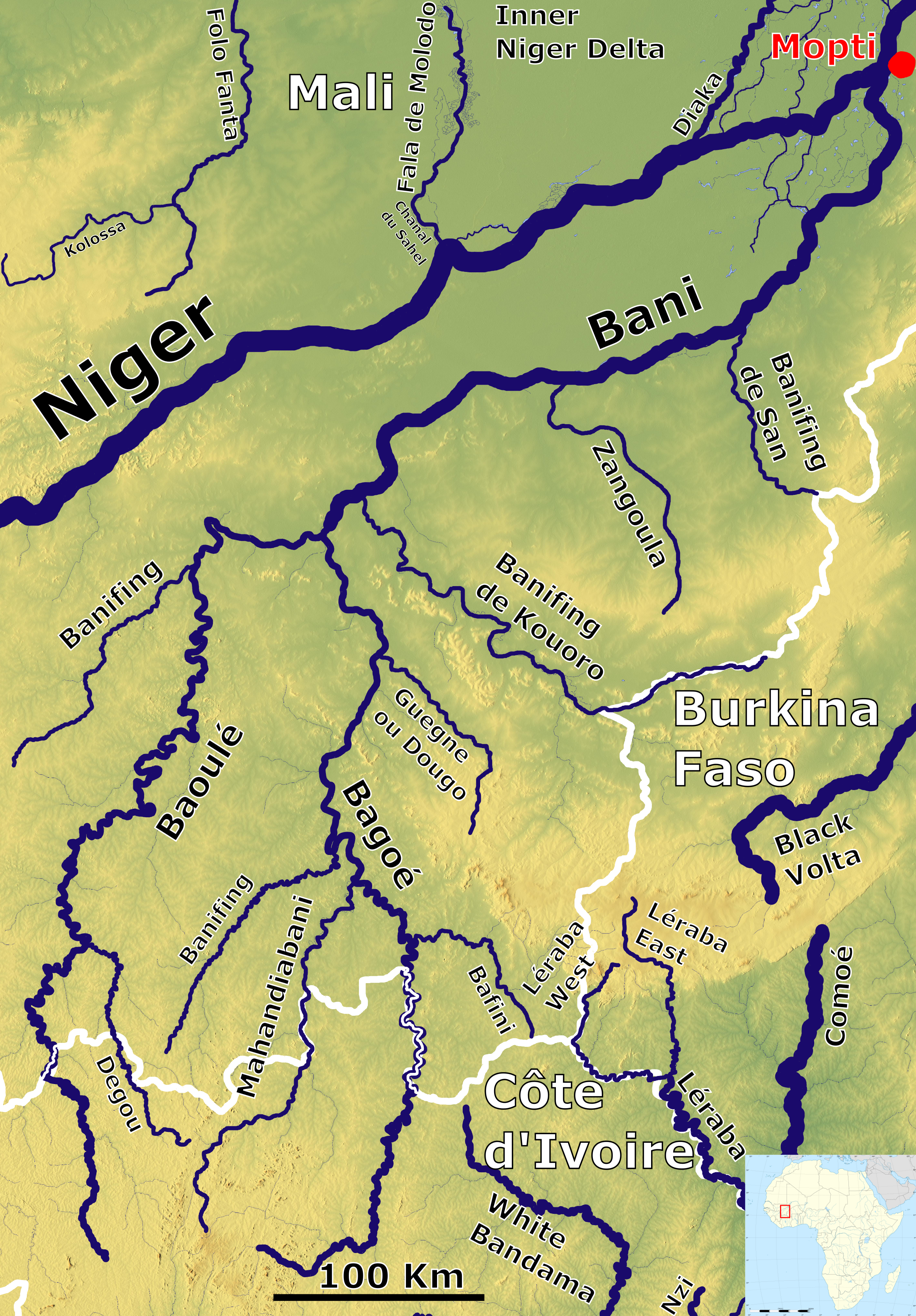
The Bani River system.

The Bagoé River is a tributary of the Bani River in western Africa. It flows through northern Ivory Coast and southern Mali and forms part of the border between the two states. A major tributary is the Banifing River.
