= Potou Lagoon =

Coordinates: 5.362°N 3.788°W

The Potou Lagoon is a shallow body of water primarily located near the Aguien Lagoon in the southeastern corner of the republic of Ivory Coast. It is about 16 km (10 mi) in length and 1 to 3 km (1 to 2 mi) wide.
