= Banifing River =

River in Burkina Faso

Coordinates: 12°22′7.3″N 6°8′40.8″W

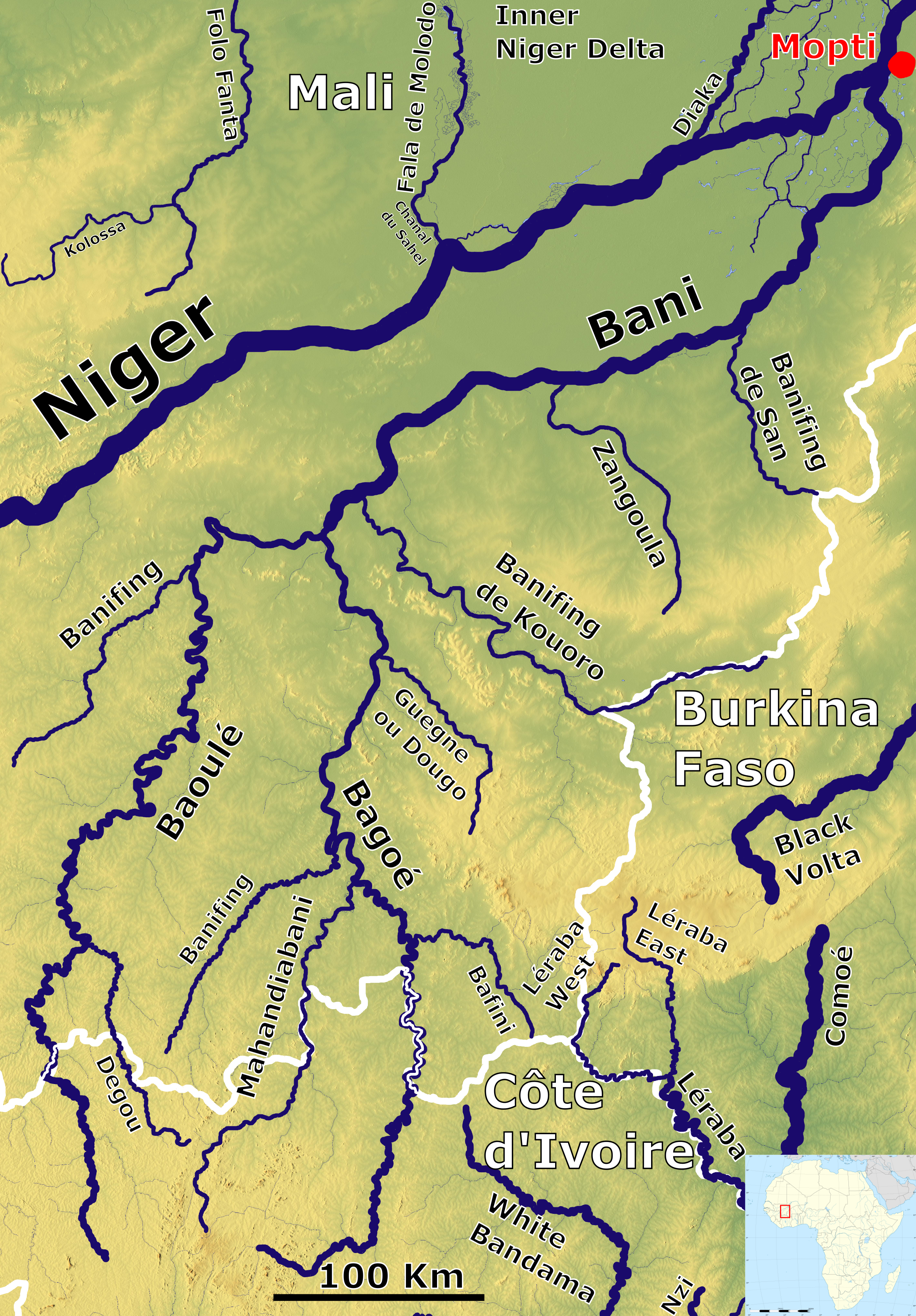
The Bani River system.

The Banifing River is a river in western Africa. It flows through Mali and a small part of Burkina Faso, forming part of the international boundary between the two countries. It is a tributary of the Bani River.
