= Ébrié Lagoon =

Lagoon in Ivory Coast

Coordinates: 5°16′19″N 4°20′21″W

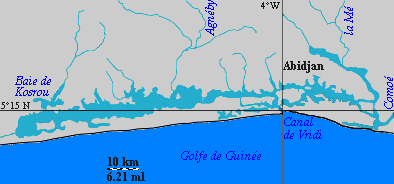
Map of part of Ivory Coast showing the Ébrié Lagoon

The Ébrié Lagoon lies in Ivory Coast, separated for almost all of its length from the Atlantic Ocean by a narrow coastal strip. The 130 km (80 mi) long lagoon is linked to the sea by the Vridi Canal, while the Komoé River flows into it. The lagoon averages 4 km (2½ mi) in width, and 5 m (16 ft) in depth. Abidjan and towns such as Grand Bassam, Bingerville, Jacqueville, Attécoubé, and Tiagba lie on the lagoon.

== Geography ==
The Ébrié Lagoon is a long narrow lagoon complex located in the south of Ivory Coast. It lies parallel with the coast on an east/west axis and consists of several linked lagoons. At the eastern end it is linked by a channel to the Aghien and Potou Lagoons, into which the Mé River flows. The other major rivers flowing into the lagoon are the Komoé River in the east, the Agnéby River in the centre, and the Ira River in the west. At the western end, Ébrié is linked by the Asagni Canal to the Tagba Lagoon and the Bandama River. It is connected to the Gulf of Guinea by the Vridi Canal, which was opened as a navigable channel in 1950. The natural mouth of the complex is at Grand-Bassam, but this tends to silt up during the dry season. There are several large and many small islands in the lagoon. The cities of Abidjan, Bingerville, Jacqueville, Attécoubé, Tiagba and Dabou lie beside the lagoon and it is crossed by four bridges.

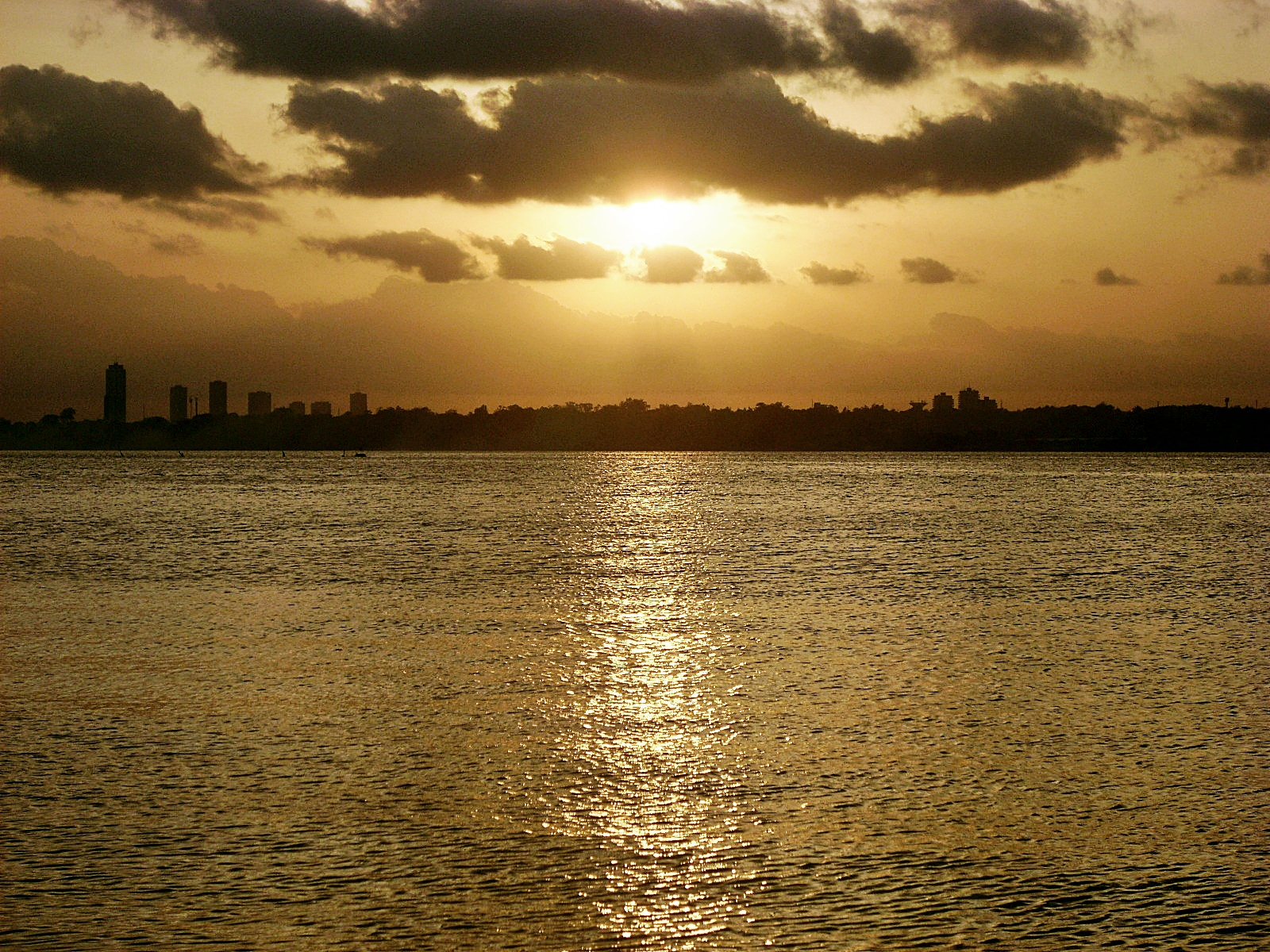
Sunset over Ébrié Lagoon, with Abidjan in the distance

The Ébrié Lagoon has an area of approximately 560 km^{2} (216 mi^{2}), a maximum length of 130 km (80 mi), and a maximum width of 7 km (4 mi). The average depth is 5 m (16 ft) and the maximum depth is 20 m (66 ft). The amount of fresh water entering the lagoon varies with the time of year, but averages 98,500,000 cubic metres (3.48×10^{9} cu ft) per year, and tidal exchanges with the sea average 380,000,000 cubic metres (1.3×10^{10} cu ft) per year. The water is brackish, varying in salinity from 0 to 35‰. It is also turbid and polluted, especially near Abidjan, with high levels of nitrogen and phosphate.

== Flora and fauna ==
There are extensive areas around the lagoon dominated by mangroves such as Rhizophora racemosa, and the golden leather fern Acrostichum aureum. Elsewhere, there are floating aquatic plants in the bays and backwaters, and reeds, sedges and grasses at the edges of the water. The lagoon is separated from the sea by a sandbar and much of the terrain close to the lagoon is swampy, with taller vegetation and some trees.

In the shallow parts of the lagoon there are a range of invertebrates including polychaete worms, nemertean worms, oligochaetes, isopods, amphipods and prawns. Over a hundred species of fish have been recorded in the lagoon, and it and the surrounding swamps are home to the African manatee, the pygmy hippopotamus, the Nile crocodile, the West African slender-snouted crocodile and the dwarf crocodile. Birds such as the African darter, the Pel's fishing owl, the white-crested tiger heron and the goliath heron breed here.

== Human use ==
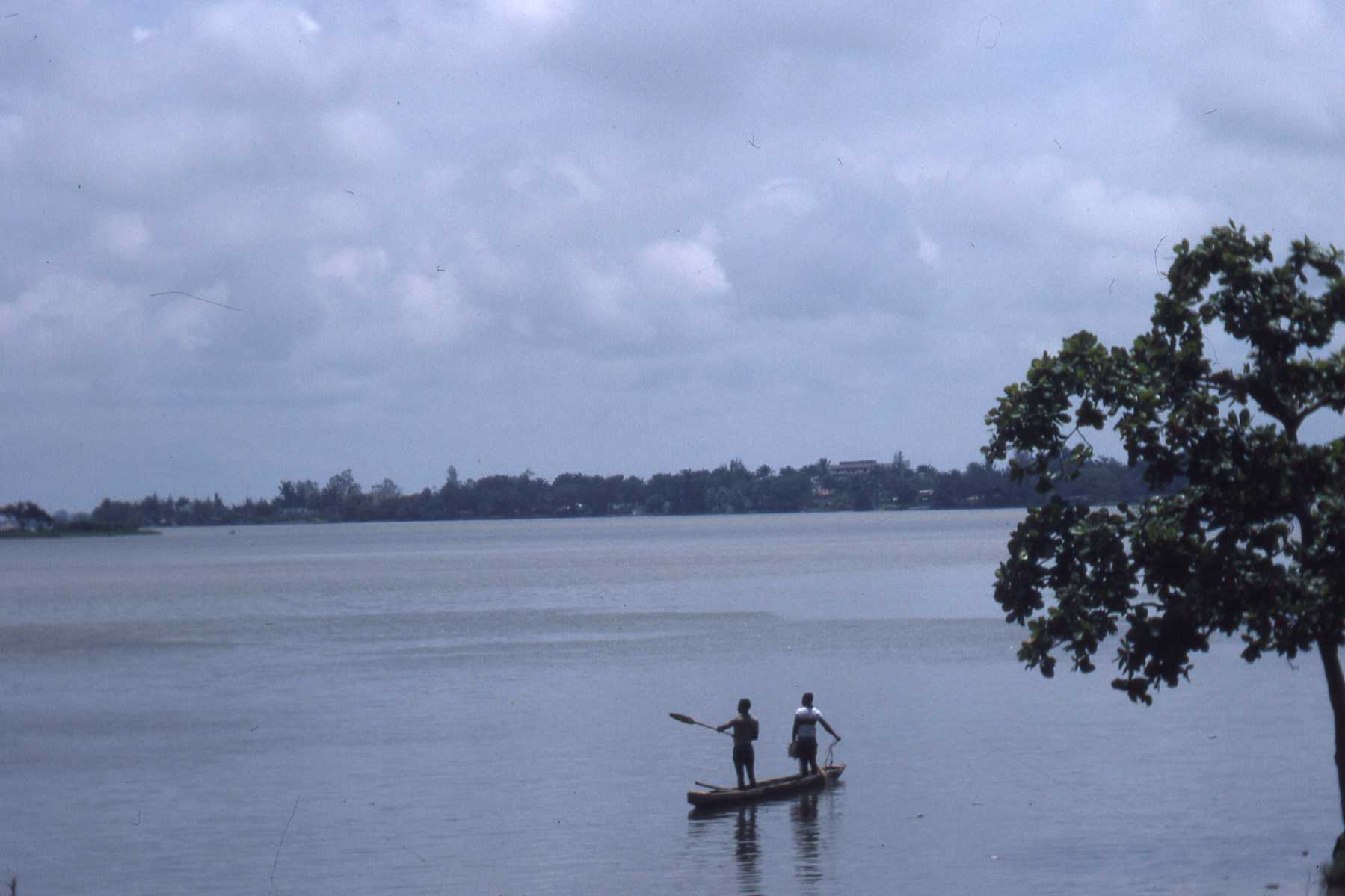
Pirogue on Ébrié Lagoon

Parts of the lagoon are highly polluted. Chemical pollution comes from the agricultural and industrial activity in the catchment area, with fertiliser run off occurring particularly in the wet season. Organic and bacterial pollution occurs mainly in urban areas, with high levels of Escherichia coli and Clostridium perfringens being detected.

There is an artisanal fishery on the lagoon, employing about seven thousand people using four thousand boats with a potential annual catch of around 8,000 tonnes (7,900 long tons; 8,800 short tons). The bonga shad (Ethmalosa fimbriata) accounts for about 75% of the catch, especially in the more polluted waters near Abidjan where it is more abundant than other species. Other fish are found away from the urban areas in unpolluted waters, with the Atlantic bumper (Chloroscombrus chrysurus) and the Madeiran sardinella (Sardinella maderensis) being abundant, and the Guinean striped mojarra (Gerres nigri) and Senegal jack (Caranx senegallus) also contributing to the catch.
