= Ira River =

River in West Africa

Coordinates: 5.342°N 4.659°W

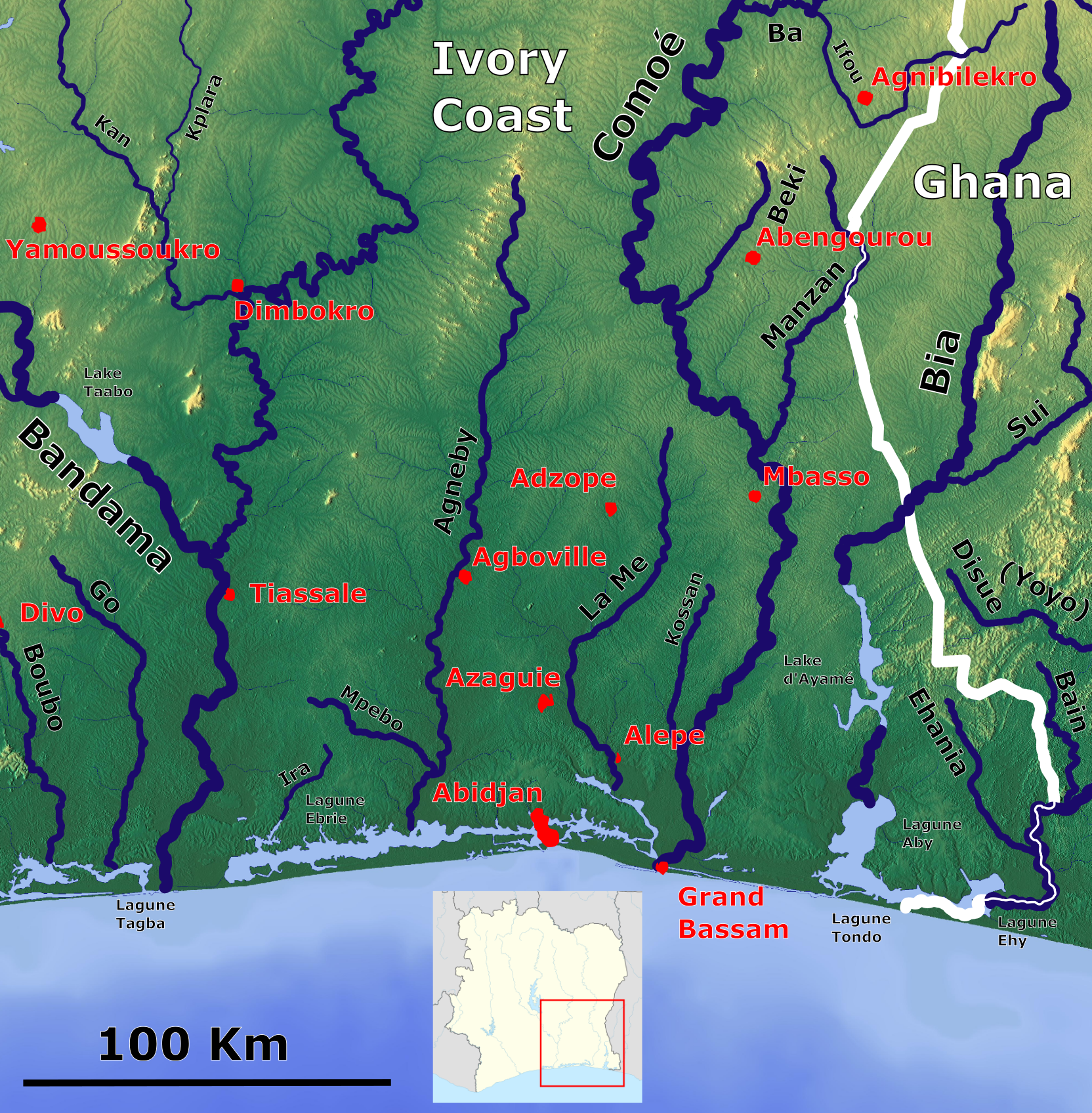
Rivers of Ivory Coast East coast (Ira lower left Centre)

The Ira River is a river in Ivory Coast in West Africa. The river originates from springs in the Lacs District and flows southwestwards before emptying into the western end of the Ébrié Lagoon. The climate in this region alternates between moisture bearing winds from the Atlantic Ocean forming the West African monsoon and dry harmattan winds from the Sahara. These alternating wet and dry seasons causes great variations in the volume of water in rivers in this area.
