= Vridi Canal =

Navigable canal in Ivory Coast, constructed in 1950

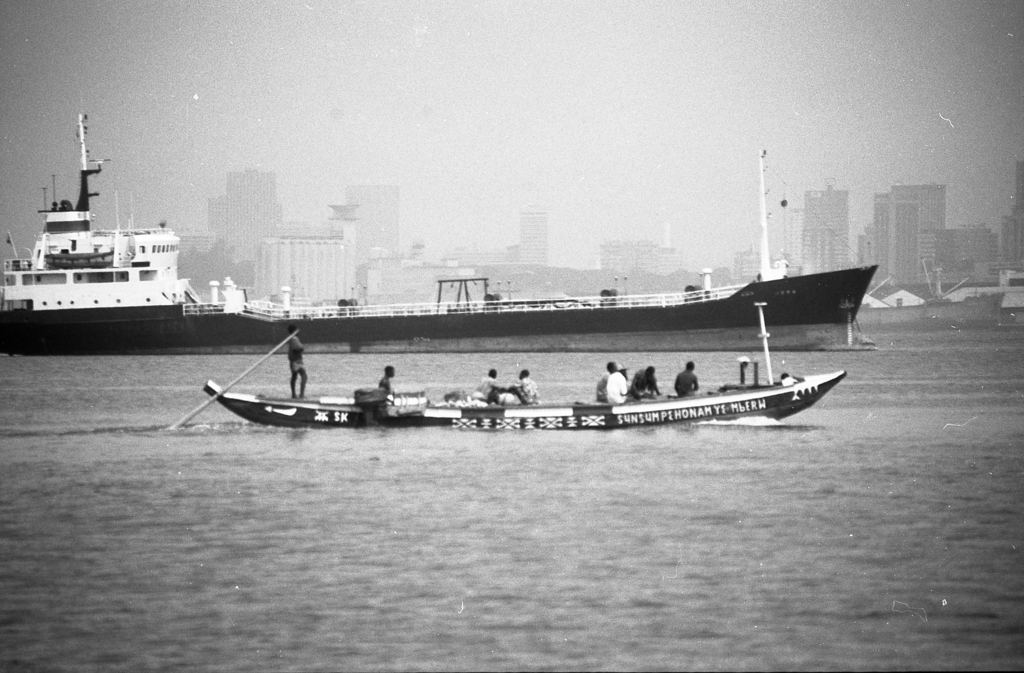
Vridi Canal in 1991

The Vridi Canal, or Canal de Vridi, is a navigable canal in Ivory Coast, connecting the port of Abidjan to the Atlantic Ocean. It was constructed in 1950 and takes its name from the village of Vridi.
