= Jacqueville =

- Town, sub-prefecture, and commune
- Location in Ivory Coast
- Coordinates: 5°12′N 4°25′W
- Country: Ivory Coast
- District: Lagunes
- Region: Grands-Ponts
- Department: Jacqueville

Population (2014)
  - Total: 32,228
- Time zone: UTC+0 (GMT)

Jacqueville (French pronunciation: [ʒakvil]) is a coastal town in southern Ivory Coast. It is a sub-prefecture of and the seat of Jacqueville Department in Grands-Ponts Region, Lagunes District. Jacqueville is also a commune. The town is 40 kilometres west of Abidjan.

Jacqueville is so named because it was the first place in Ivory Coast where the Union Jack was raised when the British originally occupied the country. It grew as a French colonial slave port, but is now primarily a fishing port and seaside resort.

Jacqueville is virtually an island, separated from most of the country by the Ébrié Lagoon, its other shore being on the Gulf of Guinea. Until March 2015, when a 776-metre bridge was opened, the only way to reach the island involved taking a ferry across the lagoon.

Jacqueville is noteworthy for the local pineapples ("ananas sauvage"), which are long narrow and have completely white and very sweet flesh. When nitrate fertilisers are used in their cultivation they become yellow and taste much more like a conventional pineapple.

In 2014, the population of the sub-prefecture of Jacqueville was 32,288.

== Villages ==
The 23 villages of the sub-prefecture of Jacqueville and their population in 2014 are:

1. Abreby (945)
2. Addah (1,973)
3. Adesse (893)
4. Adjacoutie (400)
5. Adjue (571)
6. Adoukro (194)
7. Adoumangan (860)
8. Ahua (406)
9. Akrou (1,289)
10. Avadivry (233)
11. Avagou (1,695)
12. Bahuama (211)
13. Couve (263)
14. Djace (203)
15. Gbehiri (241)
16. Grand-Jack (2,844)
17. Jacqueville (11,124)
18. Kraffy (231)
19. M'bokrou (336)
20. N'djem (5,165)
21. Niangoussou (200)
22. Sassako-Bégnini (1,409)
23. Taboutou (602)
