= Jacqueville Department =

Coordinates: 5°9′N 4°24′W

Jacqueville Department Département de Jacqueville
- Department
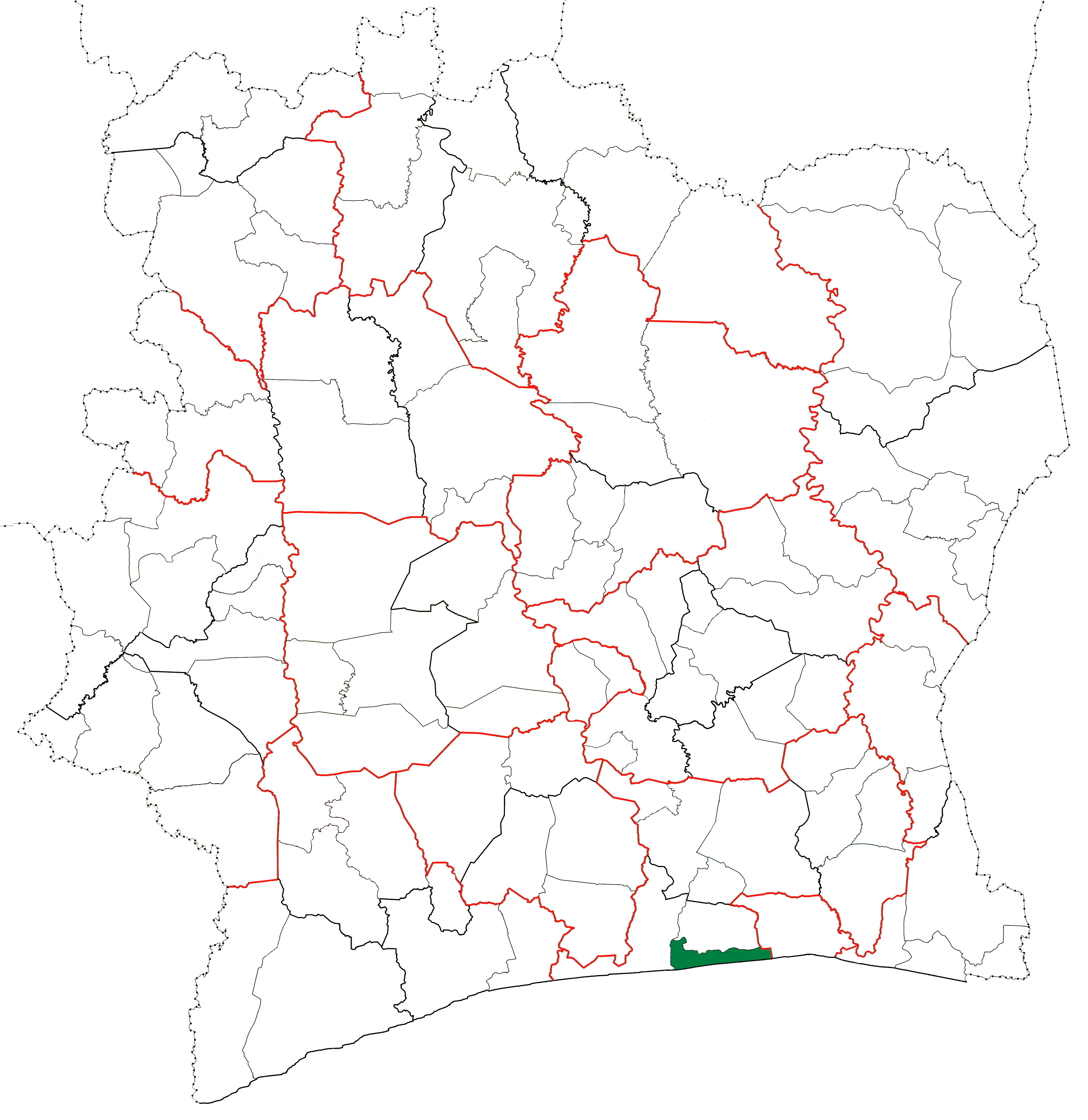
- Location in Ivory Coast. Jacqueville Department has retained the same boundaries since its creation in 1998.
- Country: Ivory Coast
- District: Lagunes
- Region: Grands-Ponts
- 1998: Established as a second-level subdivision via a division of Abidjan Dept
- 2011: Converted to a third-level subdivision
- Departmental seat: Jacqueville

Government
  - Prefect: Kouamé Jean-Noël N'Da

Area
  - Total: 656 km^{2} (253 sq mi)

Population (2021 census)
  - Total: 80,593
  - Density: 123/km^{2} (318/sq mi)
- Time zone: UTC+0 (GMT)

Jacqueville Department (French: Département de Jacqueville, [depaʁtəmɑ̃ də ʒakvil]) or simply Jacqueville, is a department of Grands-Ponts Region, Lagunes District, Ivory Coast. In 2021, its population was 80,593, and its seat is the settlement of Jacqueville. The sub-prefectures of the department are Attoutou and Jacqueville.

== History ==
Jacqueville Department was created in 1998 as a second-level subdivision via a split-off from Abidjan Department. At its creation, it was part of Lagunes Region.

In 2011, districts were introduced as new first-level subdivisions of Ivory Coast. At the same time, regions were reorganised and became second-level subdivisions and all departments were converted into third-level subdivisions. At this time, Jacqueville Department became part of Grands-Ponts Region in Lacs District.
